= List of earthquakes in the Soviet Union =

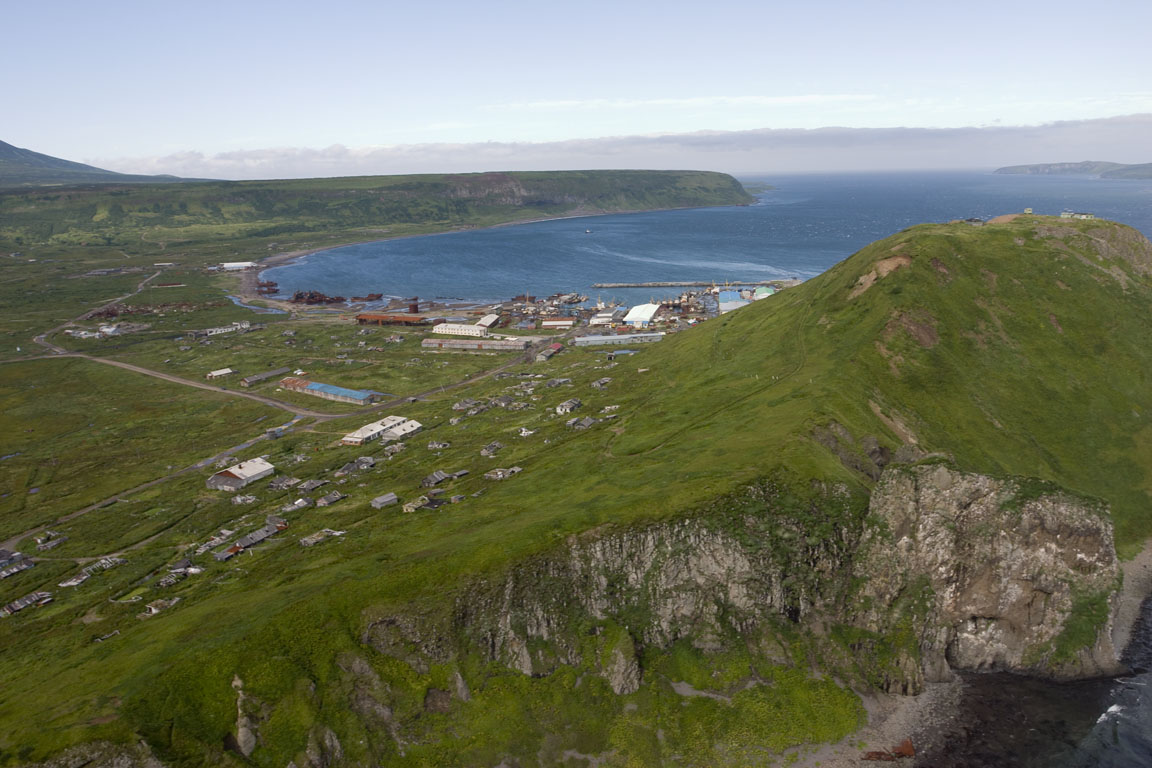
Helicopter view of the place where Severo-Kurilsk was located before the 1952 tsunami, triggered by the most powerful earthquake recorded in the Soviet Union

Earthquakes were common in the Soviet Union, especially in the eastern regions such as the Kamchatka Peninsula and the Kuril Islands, which lie along the Pacific Ring of Fire. These areas experienced frequent minor earthquakes as well as regular high-magnitude events. Other regions, including the Caucasus and parts of Central Asia, also recorded significant seismic activity.

The following is a list of notable earthquakes and tsunamis which had their epicenter in areas that were in the Soviet Union or otherwise had a significant impact on the Soviet Union.

== Earthquakes ==
Date	Region	Mag.	MMI	Deaths	Injuries	Total damage / notes
1991-04-29	Georgia	7.0 M_{w}	IX	270		$1.7 billion.
1990-07-13	Afghanistan; Tajik SSR; Kirghiz SSR	6.4 M_{w}	IV	43	2	Regarded as the deadliest mountaineering disaster in history
1990-5-31	Romania; Bulgaria; Moldavian SSR; Ukrainian SSR	6.4 M_{w}	VII			
1990-5-30	Romania; Bulgaria; Moldavian SSR; Ukrainian SSR	6.9 M_{w}	VIII	14	362	$30 million
1989-01-22	Tajik SSR	5.3 M_{w}	VII	274	Many injuries	$24 million
1988-12-07	Armenian SSR	6.8 M_{w}	X	25,000–50,000; 38,000 (2017 estimate)	31,000–130,000	$16.2 billion
1986-08-30	Romania; Bulgaria; Moldavian SSR; Ukrainian SSR	6.5 M_{w} ^{(NIEP)} 7.2 M_{w} ^{(USGS)}	VIII	2 (official); Over 150 (unofficial)	558	55,000 homes damaged
1985-10-13	Tajik SSR	5.8 M_{w}	IX	29	>80	$200 million
1977-03-04	Romania; Bulgaria; Moldavian SSR; Ukrainian SSR	7.5 M_{w}	IX	1,578 in Romania; 120 in Bulgaria; 2 in Moldova	11,221 in Romania; 165 in Bulgaria	$2.048 billion
1976-10-25	Estonian SSR	4.5 mb	V			Most powerful earthquake recorded in Estonia
1971-05-10	Kazakh SSR	5.3 M_{w}				28,000 buildings and structures damaged
1970-05-14	Russian SFSR	6.7 M_{w}	VIII	31	1,000+	
1966-04-25	Uzbek SSR	5.2 M_{w}	VII	15-200		
1963-10-20	Russian SFSR	7.8 M_{w}				Tsunami
1963-10-13	Russian SFSR	8.5 M_{w}				Tsunami
1959-05-04	Russian SFSR	8.0–8.3 M_{w}	VIII	1	13	Tsunami
1958-11-06	Russian SFSR	8.3–8.4 M_{w}	X			
1952-11-04	Russian SFSR	8.8–9.0 M_{w}	XI	2,336–14,000		Most powerful earthquake to strike the Soviet Union and the fifth most powerful earthquake ever recorded in the world
1949-07-10	Tajik SSR	7.5 M_{w}	IX	~7,200		
1948-10-05	Turkmen SSR; Iran	7.3 M_{s}	X	10,000–110,000		
1946-11-02	Kirghiz SSR; Kazakh SSR; Uzbek SSR	7.5–7.6 M_{w}	X	Unknown		
1940-11-10	Romania; Moldavian SSR	7.7 M_{w}	X	593 in Romania and 78 in Moldova	1,271 in Romania	65,000 homes destroyed
1931-04-27	Transcaucasian SFSR	6.5 M_{w}	IX	390–2,890		
1929-05-01	Iran; Turkmen SSR	7.2 M_{w}	IX	3,257–3,800	1,121	
1927-09-16	Crimean ASSR	4.9 M_{w}				Sea receded at Balaklava Bay
1927-09-11	Crimean ASSR	6.7 M_{w}	VIII			Tsunami
1927-06-26	Crimean ASSR	6.0 M_{w}	VII–VIII			Tsunami
1926-10-22	Turkey; Transcaucasian SFSR	6.0 M_{w}	IX	360		
1923-04-13	Russian SFSR	7.0–8.2 M_{w}	X	36		Tsunami
1923-02-03	Russian SFSR	8.4 M_{w}	XI	3		Tsunami

== List of strongest earthquakes in the Soviet Union by Union Republic ==
Union Republic	Magnitude	Date	Further information
Armenian Soviet Socialist Republic	6.8 M_{w}	1988-12-07	1988 Armenian earthquake
Estonian Soviet Socialist Republic	4.5 mb	1976-10-25	Osmussaar earthquake
Georgian Soviet Socialist Republic	7.0 M_{w}	1991-04-29	1991 Racha earthquake
Kazakh Soviet Socialist Republic	7.5–7.6 M_{w}	1946-11-02	1946 Chatkal earthquake
Kirghiz Soviet Socialist Republic	7.5–7.6 M_{w}	1946-11-02	1946 Chatkal earthquake
Moldavian Soviet Socialist Republic	7.7 M_{w}	1940-11-10	1940 Vrancea earthquake
Russian Soviet Federative Socialist Republic	8.8–9.0 M_{w}	1952-11-04	1952 Severo-Kurilsk earthquake
Tajik Soviet Socialist Republic	7.5 M_{w}	1949-07-10	1949 Khait earthquake
Turkmen Soviet Socialist Republic	7.3 M_{s}	1948-10-05	1948 Ashgabat earthquake
Ukrainian Soviet Socialist Republic	7.7 M_{w}	1940-11-10	1940 Vrancea earthquake
Uzbek Soviet Socialist Republic	5.2 M_{w}	1966-04-25	1966 Tashkent earthquake

=== Short-lived Union Republics of the Soviet Union ===
Union Republic	Magnitude	Date	Further information
Crimean ASSR	6.7 M_{w}	1927-09-11	1927 Crimean earthquakes
Transcaucasian Socialist Federative Soviet Republic	6.5 M_{w}	1931-04-27	1931 Zangezur earthquake

== See also ==
- List of earthquakes in Armenia
- List of earthquakes in Azerbaijan
- List of earthquakes in Georgia
- List of earthquakes in Kazakhstan
- List of earthquakes in Kyrgyzstan
- List of earthquakes in Moldova
- List of earthquakes in Russia
- List of earthquakes in Tajikistan
