= 1958 Kuril Islands earthquake =

Earthquake in 1958 located near the Kuril Islands

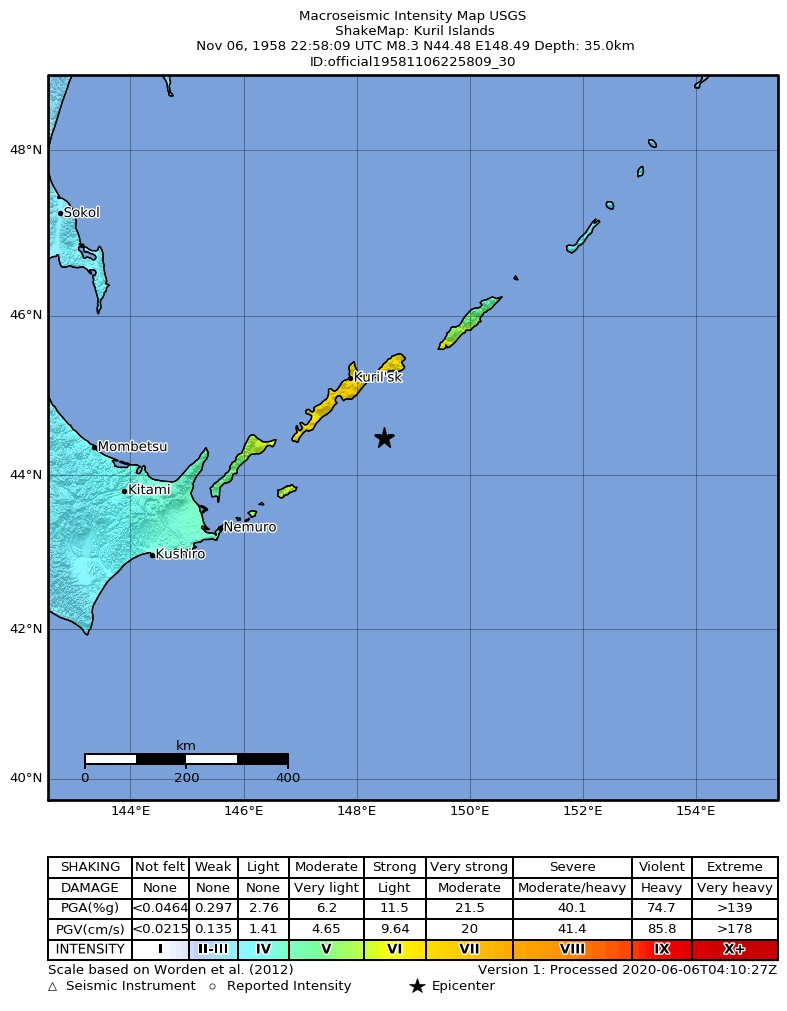
- USGS ShakeMap

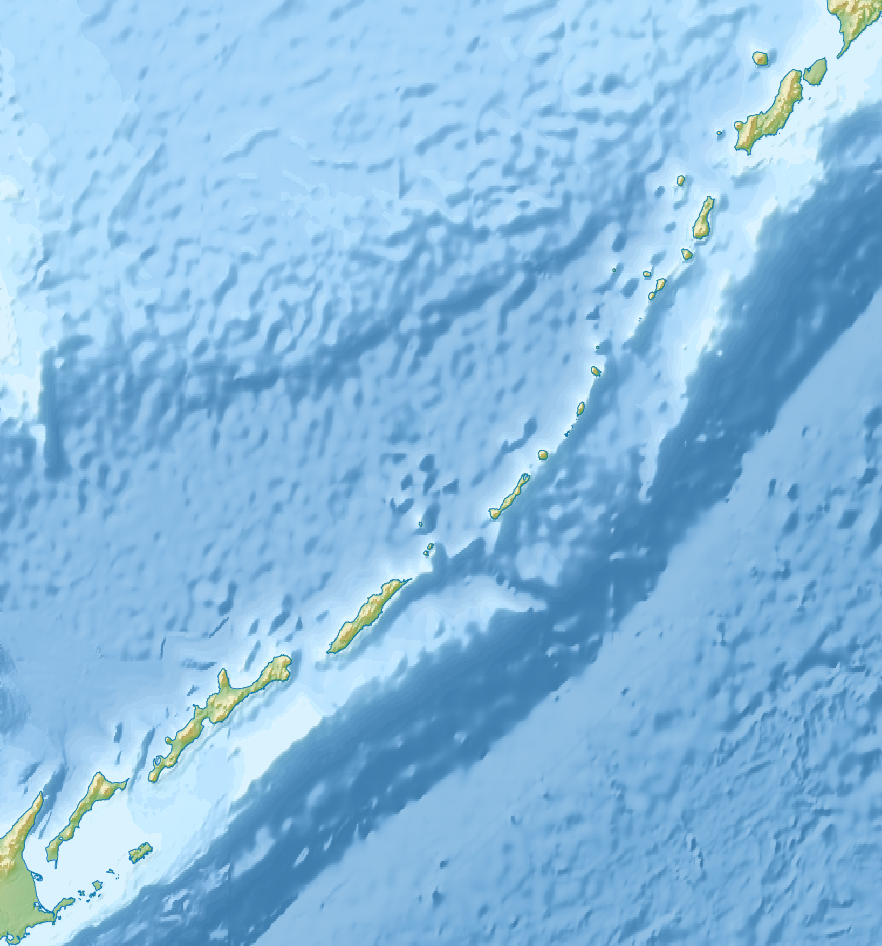
- Location within Kuril Islands Location within Russia
- UTC time: 1958-11-06 22:58:09
- ISC event: 885402
- USGS-ANSS: ComCat
- Local date: November 7, 1958
- Local time: 09:58:09
- Magnitude: M_{w} 8.3–8.4, M_{s} 7.9–8.5 (Note: M_{w} 8.3, M_{w} 8.4 M_{s} 8.1, M_{s} 8.2 ± 0.3 mb 8.2 M_{t} 8.2 M_{m} 8.64 M_{uk} 8.7)
- Depth: 35–40 km (22–25 mi)
- Epicenter: 44.479°N 148.45°E
- Areas affected: Soviet Union
- Max. intensity: MMI X (Extreme)
- Tsunami: 5 m (16 ft)

The 1958 Kuril Islands earthquake or Etorofu earthquake was a M_{w} 8.3–8.4 earthquake that struck near the Kuril island of Iturup on November 6, 1958, at 22:58 UTC, or 09:58 on the 7th local time. The earthquake occurred as the result of shallow reverse faulting along the Kuril-Kamchatka Trench, and caused Modified Mercalli Intensity (MMI) X (Extreme) shaking, as well as a tsunami 5 m (16 ft) high. Iturup sustained significant damage as a result of the shaking and tsunami, with other locations along the Kuril Islands also reporting strong damage.

== Tectonic setting ==
The Kuril Islands lie along the seismically active convergent boundary between the Pacific plate and the Okhotsk plate (a microplate within the North American plate). The trench that accommodates this subduction—the Kuril-Kamchatka Trench, accommodates the convergence at a rate of 80 mm (3.1 in)/yr, with rates increasing from north to south. This active subduction zone spawns many large Kamchatka earthquakes with strong earthquakes along the trench occurring in 1737, 1841, February 1923, April 1923, 1952, 1959, and in 1963.

== Earthquake ==
The earthquake struck at 09:58 on November 7 locally, or 22:58 on the 6th in UTC. The earthquake occurred at a depth of 35–40 km (22–25 mi), with a moment magnitude of M_{w} 8.3–8.4. The International Seismological Centre estimated the surface-wave magnitude for this event at M_{s} 8.2 ± 0.3. Maximum felt intensities associated with the earthquake were X (Extreme) on the Modified Mercalli intensity scale in Lake Iturup. The earthquake occurred as the result of reverse faulting along the Kuril-Kamchatka trench. Despite having a relatively short aftershock area of 150–170 km (93–106 mi) long by 70–80 km (43–50 mi) wide, the earthquake had a high stress drop and large felt area. A 1979 study attributes this to an unusually long interval between ruptures, which allowed more stress to build up.

== Tsunami ==
The tsunami from this earthquake reportedly reached up to 5 m (16 ft) in height at Shikotan Island, 2–4 m (6 ft 7 in – 13 ft 1 in) at Iturup, and up to 2 m (6 ft 7 in) in northern Hokkaido. Midway and Hawaii also recorded many runups, including a 0.3 m (1 ft 0 in) measurement in Kahului, Maui, and a 0.2 m (7.9 in) runup in Midway. Attu Island, Alaska and Wake Island recorded 0.2 m (7.9 in) tsunami, with Kwajalein, Marshall Islands, Pagopago, Samoa recording 0.1 m (3.9 in). In California, San Francisco recorded 0.2 m (7.9 in) tsunami heights, and Port Hueneme recorded tsunami as well. Tsunami waves reached as far as Talara, Peru. A tsunami warning was issued for coastal Hokkaido and portions of Honshu, however the feared tsunami failed to materialize.

A M_{w} 7.0 aftershock on November 12 caused another tsunami with runups reaching 1 m (3 ft 3 in) at Iturup and 42 cm (17 in) at Hachinohe, Japan. Sweeper Cove in Adak Island recorded a 0.1 m (3.9 in) tsunami, which was larger than that of the main shock's in the same area.

== Damage ==
Lake Iturup sustained the greatest damage, with many older buildings ruined, moved furniture, and cracks in the cement basins of fisheries. Lake Kunashir also suffered severe damage, with reports of appliances and buildings being destroyed. Various physical changes occurred in the Kuril Islands such as "agitated" bodies of water, changes in the level of ground-water, landslides, earth creeps, creation and destruction of hot springs, and new fissures forming. Kushiro sustained lesser damage including cut telephone lines and halted trains. Miyako in Iwate suffered some damage to its oyster bed.
