= 1918 Kuril Islands earthquake and tsunami =

Natural disaster in the northwest Pacific

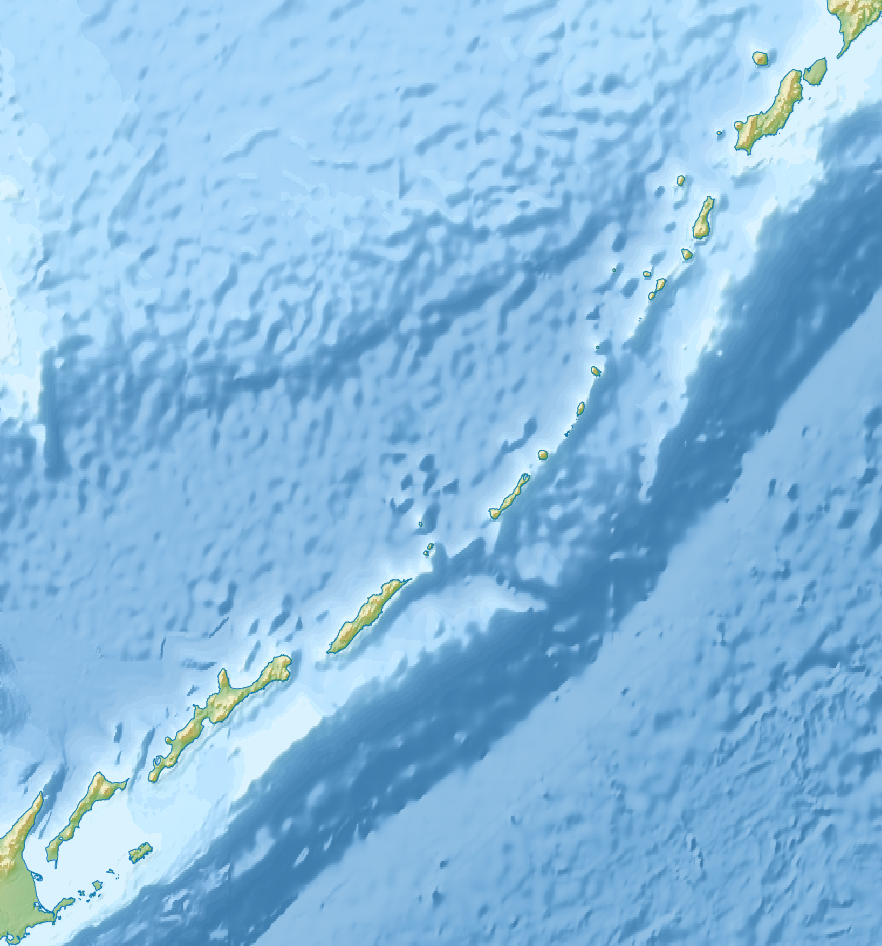
- Location within Kuril Islands
- UTC time: 1918-09-07 17:16:27
- ISC event: 913260
- USGS-ANSS: ComCat
- Local date: 8 September 1918
- Local time: 04:16:27 MAGT (UTC+11)
- Magnitude: M_{w} 8.1
- Depth: 15 km (9 mi)
- Epicenter: 44.998°N 152.320°E
- Areas affected: Kuril Islands, Russia
- Max. intensity: MMI VI (Strong)
- Tsunami: 12 m (39 ft)
- Casualties: 23 fatalities, 7 injuries

The 1918 Kuril Islands earthquake occurred on 8 September at 04:16 MAGT (17:16 UTC on 7 September), with a moment magnitude of 8.1. The earthquake generated a tsunami that affected across the North Pacific Ocean killing 23 people and injuring seven others.

== Tectonic setting ==
The earthquake occurred off the Kamchatka Peninsula's east coast, which runs parallel to the Kuril-Kamchatka Trench, the area where the Pacific and Okhotsk Sea plates converge. Being older and denser, the Pacific plate subducts beneath the Kamchatka Peninsula, which sits on the Okhotsk Sea Plate. These plates subduct along a convergent boundary, marked by the trench. The subduction zone is seismogenic and produces Kamchatka earthquakes, which occasionally generate tsunamis. Earthquakes associated with the Kuril-Kamchatka subduction zone are of the megathrust type. The subduction zone is associated with at least two known ~9.0 M_{w} earthquakes in the pre-instrumental period; 1737 and 1841. The 1737 earthquake measured M_{w} 9.0–9.3, and generated the largest known tsunami on the peninsula. Another M_{w} 9.0 earthquake struck the peninsula on May 17, 1841 and generated a tsunami up to 15 meters high.

== Earthquake ==
The earthquake had an epicenter located in the Pacific Ocean, from the island of Urup which is a part of the southern Kuril Islands. The earthquake had a maximum Modified Mercalli intensity of VI (Strong). The seismic shaking produced by this earthquake was also reported in parts of Japan. The event most likely occurred on the subduction zone based on the presence of the large tsunami and felt area. About two-thirds of the northern rupture zone may have re-ruptured in [[1963 Kuril Islands earthquake|a M_{w} 8.5 earthquake in 1963]]. Adjacent sections of the subduction zone ruptured during the 1963 and 2006 earthquakes. In November 1918, a M_{w} 7.8 earthquake occurred 160 km (99 mi) away from the September event.

=== Tsunami ===
The mainshock generated a tsunami with a height of 12 m (39 ft) along the Kuril Islands. The tsunami killed 23 people and injured 7 others. Nineteen homes were also damaged.

== See also ==
- List of earthquakes in 1918
- List of earthquakes in Russia
