= 1959 Kamchatka earthquake =

Earthquake in 1959 located in Kamchatka

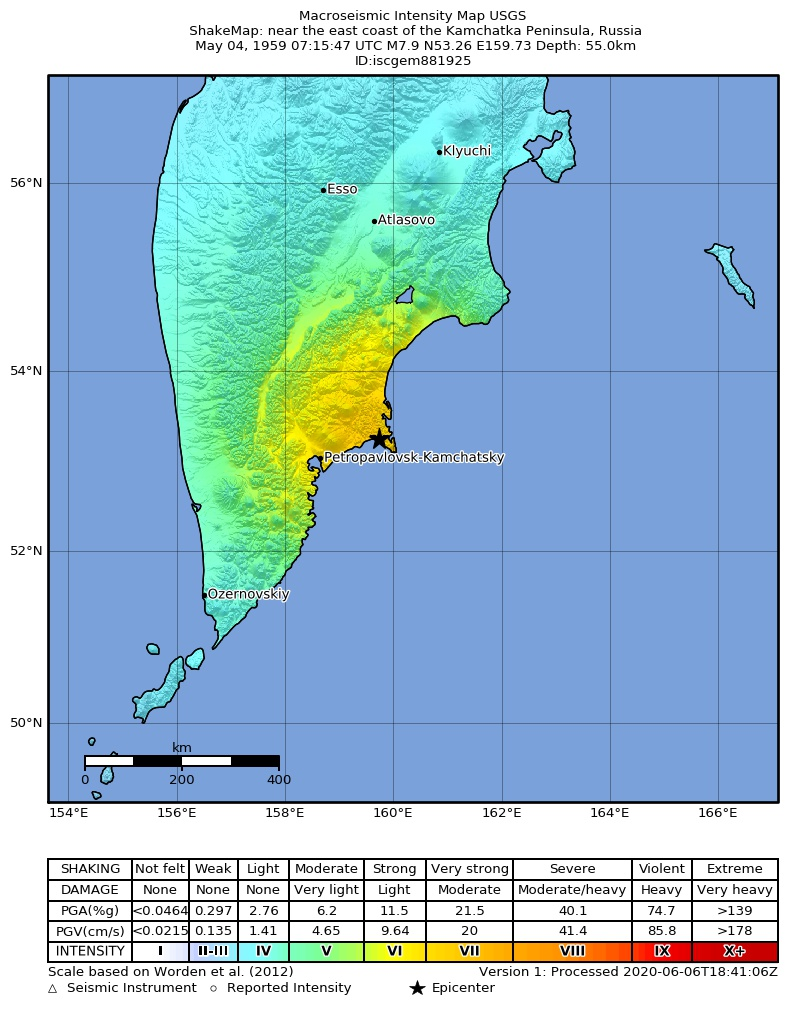
- USGS ShakeMap

- Location within Kamchatka Krai
- UTC time: 1959-05-04 07:15:47
- ISC event: 881925
- USGS-ANSS: ComCat
- Local date: May 4, 1959
- Local time: 19:15
- Magnitude: 8.25 M_{s}, 8.0–8.3 M_{w}
- Depth: 20–60 km (12–37 mi)
- Epicenter: 53.37°N 159.66°E
- Areas affected: USSR
- Max. intensity: MSK-64 VIII (Damaging)
- Casualties: 1 killed, 13 injured

The 1959 Kamchatka earthquake occurred on May 4 at 19:15 local time with a moment magnitude of 8.0–8.3, and a surface wave magnitude of 8.25. The epicenter was near the Kamchatka Peninsula, Russian SFSR, USSR. Building damage was reported in Petropavlovsk-Kamchatsky. The maximum intensity was VIII (Damaging) on the Medvedev–Sponheuer–Karnik scale. The intensity in Petropavlovsk-Kamchatsky was about VIII MSK.

The earthquake triggered a tsunami with 0.2 meters (7.9 in) of runup that was recorded in Massacre Bay, Alaska, in the United States. Subduction is active along about the southern half of the eastern coast of Kamchatka Peninsula, between its junctions with the Aleutian Islands and the Kuril Islands.

== Tectonic setting ==
Kamchatka lies near a large convergent boundary—the Kuril-Kamchatka Trench—which accommodates the subduction of the Pacific plate under the Okhotsk plate (a microplate within the North American plate). Subduction occurs at a rate of 80 mm (3.1 in)/yr at the trench, increasing from north to south. This subduction zone generates Kamchatka earthquakes and their associated tsunamis. This subduction zone is associated with many large events throughout history, including earthquakes in 1737, 1841, 1923, and 1952. The 1737 earthquake was likely the strongest event on the peninsula, with magnitudes reaching M_{w} 9.3 and tsunami run-ups reportedly exceeding 60 m (200 ft) The 1841 event is considered slightly weaker, with maximum magnitude estimates reaching M_{w} 9.0–9.2, and the tsunami run-up was 15 m (49 ft). The 1923 earthquake was also quite strong, measuring M_{w} 8.5. The 1952 event was the most recent of the great earthquakes (M_{w} 8.5+) along the Kuril-Kamchatka trench, and measured M_{w} 9.0. The resulting tsunami from this earthquake generated runups up to 18 m (59 ft) high.

== Earthquake ==
The earthquake struck at 7:15 UTC, or 19:15 local time on May 4, 1959. The earthquake occurred at a depth of 20–60 km (12–37 mi), with a magnitude of 8.0–8.3. This event nucleated near where the 1952 earthquake ruptured with the most slip, and just south of the 1923 earthquake. The shock ruptured an area 160 km (99 mi) wide, and 110 km (68 mi) long. The maximum intensity on the Medvedev–Sponheuer–Karnik scale (MSK) was VIII (Damaging), and maximum felt intensities in Petropavlovsk-Kamchatsky were also MSK VIII.

== Tsunami ==
The tsunami was small, which was expected for the size of the earthquake. Run-ups of 1.5–2 m (4 ft 11 in – 6 ft 7 in) were recorded, and at the Honolulu tide gauge, readings of 0.1 m (3.9 in) above the tide were also recorded. Readings of 0.2 m (7.9 in) run-ups in Hawaii were reported as well. In Massacre Bay, Alaska, run-ups of up to 0.2 m (7.9 in) were recorded.

== See also ==
- List of earthquakes in 1959
- List of earthquakes in Russia
