= List of earthquakes in Russia =

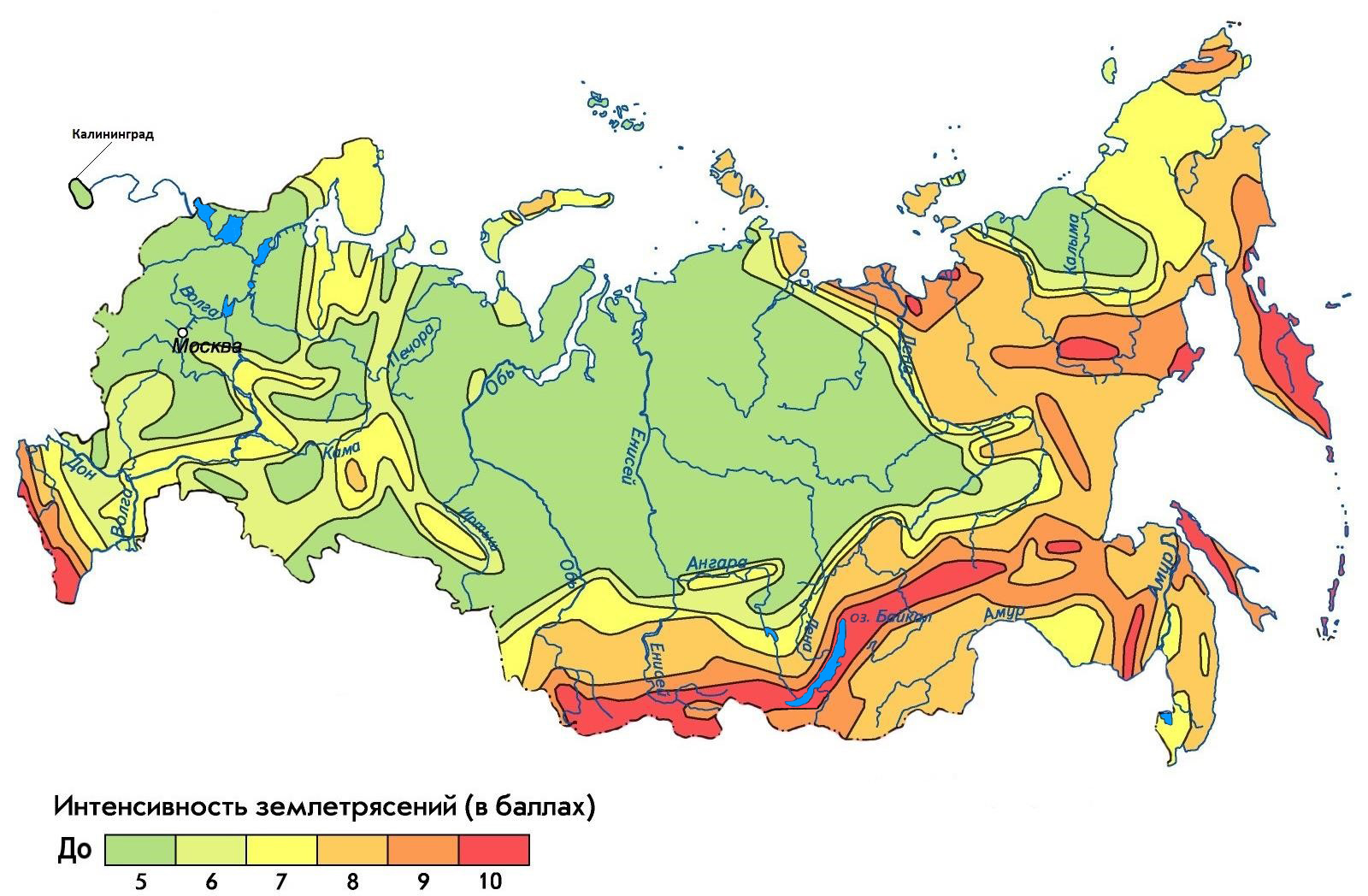
Map of seismic activity in Russia (zones are shown up to the maximum number of intensity points in the colored regions)

The largest earthquakes in Russia (≥ 8.0 M) since the 1950s

Earthquakes in Russia have occasionally been damaging and deadly.

== Map ==
Some of the largest Russian earthquakes since the latter half of the 20th century are the 1958/1963 and 2006/2007 earthquakes in the Kuril Islands near Japan, as well as the 1952/1959 earthquakes in the Kamchatka Peninsula, all of which were ≥ 8.0 M. See also the Kuril–Kamchatka Trench.

== Earthquakes ==
Date	Region	Mag.	MMI	Deaths	Injuries	Total damage / notes
2025-09-18	Kamchatka	7.8 M_{w}	VIII			Aftershock of the 2025 Kamchatka earthquake
2025-09-13	Kamchatka	7.4 M_{w}	VI			Aftershock of the July 29 event
2025-07-30	Kamchatka	8.8 M_{w}	IX	1	25	Second-largest ever recorded in Russia behind the 1952 event
2025-07-20	Kamchatka	7.4 M_{w}	VIII			Foreshock to the July 29 event / Minor damage
2024-08-17	Kamchatka	7.0 M_{w}	VI			Possible foreshock to the July 29, 2025 event
2022-07-05	Kemerovo	4.4 M_{w}		2	2	Deaths due to rockfalls in a mine
2020-03-25	Kuril Islands	7.5 M_{w}	V	1		Tsunami
2017-07-18	Komandorski Islands	7.8 M_{w}	VII			
2013-05-24	Okhotsk Sea	8.3 M_{w}	V			Significant in seismology
2011-12-27	Tuva	6.6 M_{w}	VI			Buildings damaged
2011-10-14	Amur	6.0 M_{w}	VII			Minor damage/Power outages
2008-10-11	North Caucasus	5.8 M_{w}	VIII	13	116	
2008-08-27	Lake Baikal	6.3 M_{w}	VIII			Minor damage
2007-08-02	Tatar Strait	6.2 M_{w}	VIII	4	12	Tsunami
2007-01-13	Kuril Islands	8.1 M_{w}	VI			Tsunami
2006-11-15	Kuril Islands	8.3 M_{w}	IV		1	Tsunami
2006-04-21	Kamchatka	7.6 M_{w}	X		40	$55 million
2004-09-21	Kaliningrad	4.8 M_{w}	VI		3	17 buildings damaged / Rare event
2003-09-27	Altai Republic	7.3 M_{w}	X	3	5	$10.6–33 million
2000-08-04	Sakhalin	6.8 M_{w}	VI		8	19,100 displaced
1997-12-05	Kamchatka	7.7 M_{w}	VII			
1995-05-27	Sakhalin	7.0 M_{s}	IX	1,989	750	$64.1–300 million
1994-10-04	Kuril Islands	8.3 M_{w}		12	1000+	Tsunami
1970-05-14	North Caucasus	6.7 M_{w}	VII	31	1,000+	
1963-10-20	Kuril Islands	7.8 M_{w}				Tsunami
1963-10-13	Kuril Islands	8.5 M_{w}	IX			Tsunami
1959-05-04	Kamchatka	8.0 M_{s}	VIII	1	13	Tsunami
1958-11-06	Kuril Islands	8.3 M_{w}	X			Tsunami
1952-11-05	Kamchatka	9.0 M_{w}	XI	2,336		Earthquake+Tsunami
1946-11-02	Kyrgyzstan, Kazakhstan and Uzbekistan	7.6 M_{w}	X	Unknown		Severe damage
1923-04-13	Kamchatka	6.8 M_{w}	X	18		Tsunami
1923-02-03	Kamchatka	8.4 M_{s}	XI	3		
1918-09-07	Kuril Islands	8.1 M_{w}		23	17	Tsunami
1911-01-03	Kazakhstan, Kyrgyzstan	7.7 M_{w}	X	452		Severe damage
1907-10-21	Uzbekistan, Tajikistan	7.4 M_{s}	IX	12,000–15,000		
1902-08-22	Kyrgyzstan, China	7.7 M_{w}	XI	2,500–20,000		Severe damage
1841-05-17	Kamchatka	9.0 M_{w}	IX			Severe damage and major tsunami
1737-10-17	Kamchatka	9.0–9.3 M_{w}		Many deaths		Devastating tsunami
Note: The inclusion criteria for adding events are based on WikiProject Earthquakes' notability guideline that was developed for stand alone articles. The principles described also apply to lists. In summary, only damaging, injurious, or deadly events should be recorded.

== See also ==
- Geology of Russia
- Kamchatka earthquakes
- List of tectonic plate interactions
- List of volcanoes in Russia
