= 1923 Kamchatka earthquake =

1923 Kamchatka earthquake may refer to:

- February 1923 Kamchatka earthquake
- April 1923 Kamchatka earthquake and tsunami

== See also ==
- Kamchatka earthquakes
