= Ring-shaped seismicity structures =

Patterns in earthquake activity

Ring-shaped seismicity structures are patterns in earthquake activity where their epicenters are distributed evenly to form a ring-like or elliptical shape. They are often associated with the preparatory process of a large earthquake by seismologists. Analysing these patterns can assist in forecasting the locations and magnitudes of future earthquakes. In most cases, these earthquakes involved are weak and they are evenly distributed on both sides of the ellipse.

== Notable examples ==
In a paper from Izvestiya, Physics of the Solid Earth dated to 23 July 2025, researchers studied ring-shaped seismicity in southern Kamchatka, a pattern in earthquakes where their epicenters are distributed around an elliptical "ring" shape. These events are often associated with the preparatory process of a large earthquake on an active fault. An analysis of earthquakes from 1973 to late 2024, including the 17 August 2024 M_{w} 7.0 earthquake and its aftershocks off the peninsula revealed three ring-shaped seismicity structures at 0–33 km (0–21 mi), 34–70 km (21–43 mi), and 71–110 km (44–68 mi). Existing studies reported that a large earthquake usually occurs about 10 to 15 years after a sudden high rate of seismicity around these structures, and in the Kamchatka area, this occurred in 2016. Based on the current knowledge, the paper said there was a likelihood of a large earthquake occurring between 2026 and 2031 with a moment magnitude of 8.4–8.8. Seven days later, a M_{ww} 8.8 earthquake occurred off the coast of the Kamchatka peninsula.

== See also ==
- Foreshock
