= April 1923 Kamchatka earthquake and tsunami =

April 1923 Kamchatka earthquake
- Location within Kamchatka Krai
- UTC time: 1923-04-13 15:31:07
- ISC event: 911331
- USGS-ANSS: ComCat
- Local date: April 14, 1923
- Local time: 02:31
- Magnitude: 6.8–7.3 M_{s}, 7.0–8.2 M_{w}
- Depth: 15 km (9.3 mi)
- Epicenter: 56.56°N 163.03°E
- Areas affected: Kamchatka, USSR (present-day Russia)
- Max. intensity: MMI X (Extreme)
- Tsunami: Up to 30 meters
- Casualties: 36 dead

On April 14, 1923, at 02:31 local time, an earthquake occurred off the northern coast of the Kamchatka Peninsula in the USSR, present-day Russia. The earthquake had a surface-wave magnitude (M_{s}) of 6.8–7.3 and an estimated moment magnitude (M_{w}) of 7.0–8.2. This event came just two months after a slightly larger earthquake with an epicenter struck south of the April event. Both earthquakes were tsunamigenic although the latter generated wave heights far exceeding that of the one in February. After two foreshocks of "moderate force", the main event caused considerable damage. Most of the 36 casualties were the result of the tsunami inundation rather than the earthquake.

== Tectonic setting ==
The earthquake occurred off the Kamchatka Peninsula's east coast, which runs parallel to the Kuril-Kamchatka Trench, the area where the Pacific and Okhotsk Sea plates converge. Being older and therefore denser, the Pacific subducts beneath the Kamchatka Peninsula, which sits on the Okhotsk Sea Plate. These two plates meet along a convergent boundary, marked by the trench. The subduction zone is seismogenic and produces Kamchatka earthquakes, which occasionally generate tsunamis; some of these megathrust earthquakes are very strong (such as the 1952 magnitude 9.0 earthquake, the 5th largest ever recorded).

== Earthquake ==
The April earthquake was part of a sequence of megathrust earthquakes on the Kamchatka Peninsula, which began in February. On February 3, a magnitude 8.4 earthquake, whose hypocenter was 15 km deep, resulted in extreme shaking assigned XI (Extreme) on the Modified Mercalli intensity scale and caused a tsunami with run-ups of 6 meters. It was followed by a magnitude 7.4 aftershock the same month.

The International Seismological Centre placed the April earthquake magnitude at 6.8 M_{s}or 7.0 M_{w}, while the NGDC and some older studies placed it at 7.3–7.4 M_{w}. Beno Gutenberg and Charles Richter assigned the event a magnitude of 7.2 M_{s}. A 2004 reevaluation of earthquakes in the region revised the earthquake magnitude to 8.2 M_{w}, based on analyzing the associated tsunami. It was not considered an aftershock of the February earthquake because it ruptured another segment of the subduction zone.

=== Location ===
The epicenter coordinates of this earthquake differ across sources and journals. The International Seismological Summary placed this at 55.7°N, 162.5°E, while the ISC-GEM Catalogue lists this event as having an epicenter at 56.36° N 162.70° E. Meanwhile, Beno Gutenberg and Charles Richter suggested the epicenter location to be 56.5° N, 16.5° E. In a 2017 study, Salaree and Okal argued it was located 110 km to the north, at 57.35° N, 162.91° E, which is northwest of Bering Island. In another study by Bourgeois and Pinegina published in 2018, the source area of the April earthquake is north of the February rupture but southwest of Bering Island and in Kamchatka Bay. On the other hand, E.R. Engdahl's relocation places the epicenter coordinates at 56.56°N, 163.03°E, inside the Kamchatskiy Peninsula and close to the ISC-GEM coordinates.

=== Characteristic ===
The earthquake was initially interpreted to be a tsunami earthquake because it generated a larger tsunami relative to the February earthquake despite having a smaller magnitude. Further supporting this early characterisation was the absence of a documented tsunami during an M_{PAS} 7.4 aftershock of the February event. However, a study published in Pure and Applied Geophysics found that no numerical modelling of the earthquake could reproduce the unusually large tsunami. Despire confirming the tsunamigenic earthquake source characteristic using the available seismograph readings, it did not account for the local tsunami observations. Instead, numerical simulation suggest the tsunami was triggered by a submarine landslide in Kamchatka Bay.

== Tsunami ==
An earthquake-triggered submarine landslide is thought to have accounted for the unusually high local tsunami run-ups. A landslide-triggered tsunami simulation satisfactorily reproduced the tsunami height distribution. A survey of the affected region discovered high run-up heights of 20–30 m (66–98 ft). The first tsunami wave arrived at Ust-Kamchatsk 15 minutes after the earthquake. Fifteen minutes later, an 11 m (36 ft) wave began advancing onshore, washing away structures at a nearby settlement and flowing upstream by 7 km (4.3 mi) on the Kamchatka River.

West of the Kamchatka River, the tsunami waves were reported with run-ups of 20–30 m (66–98 ft). Japanese-owned fish canneries and villages were totally destroyed. A small cutter belonging to the Nichiro cannery was found 1–2 km (0.62–1.24 mi) inland, 30 m (98 ft) above sea level. The extent of damage decreased abruptly eastwards along a 10 km (6.2 mi) portion of a spit that separated Lake Nerpichye from Kamchatka Bay. On the spit, a cannery was completely destroyed. A newer cannery and radio station at the same location had moderate damage only. The tsunami height at Perevoloka was approximately 1 m (3 ft 3 in).

A run-up of 4 m (13 ft) was recorded at Bering Island. On the Hawaiian Islands, the tsunami was recorded 0.3 m (1 ft 0 in) at Hilo, 0.2 m (7.9 in) at Honolulu and 0.08 m (3.1 in) at Tofino. On the United States west coast, a 0.15 m (5.9 in) wave was recorded at San Francisco while at the Port of Los Angeles, some swirls were observed between 06:00 and 10:00. A weak tsunami was also recorded along the Japanese coast.

== Damage and aftermath ==
Before the main shock, a sequence of foreshocks was felt for four hours, keeping the residents on high alert. Two noticeable foreshocks occurred on 13 April at 21:00 and 14 April at 01:00 local time respectively. They were felt with light to moderate intensities, causing hanging items to sway slightly.

The earthquake struck at 02:00 am local time on 14 April. Its reported intensity was as high as X (Extreme) on the Modified Mercalli intensity scale. A local newspaper reported that many barns and dilapidated houses were destroyed. More than 230 animals perished, including dogs, cows, and pigs. Residents in towns and villages were driven out of their homes when the earthquake shook. The tremors knocked hanging photographs, dishes on shelves, and stoves to the floor. It also cracked the windows of many homes.

The tsunami killed 36 people along the coast of Kamchatka. Twenty-three of those killed were in Ust-Kamchatsk, of which there were 13 Japanese, five Russian and five Chinese victims. Along the coasts, the tsunami tore off trees by the roots. A small Japanese boat was also deposited some 30 meters on top of a raised beach. At the time, the boat was occupied by a Japanese couple and when the tsunami struck, one of them was killed.

After the earthquake and tsunami, many survivors relocated to other villages upstream to avoid a similar disaster. Cherny Yar and Nizhnekamchatsk were among the villages that survivors moved into because they were situated far inland and safe from future tsunamis. Some of the remaining inhabitants of Ust-Kamchatsk later founded the village of Krutoberegovo because the tsunami had badly affected the main city. Others remained in the city to reconstruct the damaged city.

The Los Angeles Times on 15 April reported that flooding in the Korean city of Busan caused over 1,000 deaths. Meanwhile, the Sydney Morning Herald on 16 April claimed that 400 people went missing due to a tidal wave in the same city. The news article also stated that the total number of people that perished was unknown, but believed to be large. Further analysis however, concluded that the Busan flooding occurred approximately 24 hours before the earthquake and is, therefore, an unrelated event.

== See also ==
- List of earthquakes in Russia
- List of earthquakes in 1923
- List of tsunamis
