= Ulakhan Fault =

Tectonic plate boundary in Russia

The Ulakhan Fault is a left-lateral transform fault that runs along the boundary between the North American plate and the Okhotsk microplate in northeast Asia. It runs from a triple junction in the Chersky Range in the west, to another triple junction with the Aleutian Trench and the Kuril Trench in the east. From the offset of dated geomorphological features, a slip rate of 5.3±1.3 mm per year has been measured, consistent with estimates from GPS-constrained global plate models. The analysis of fault scarps along the fault zone in the Seymchan Basin suggests that the fault is characterised by occasional large (M_{w}>7.5) earthquakes.
