= List of earthquakes in Moldova =

Below is the list of earthquakes in Moldova stronger than 5.0M_{w}

| Date | Mag. at the epicenter | Epicenter location | Sources |
|---|---|---|---|
| April 6, 1790 | ~7-8 M_{w} | | |
| October 26, 1802 | ~7-8 M_{w} | | |
| September 29, 1821 | ~7-8 M_{w} | | |
| November 29, 1821 | ~7 M_{w} | | |
| November 23, 1829 | ~7-8 M_{w} | | |
| January 23, 1938 | ~7 M_{w} | | |
| April 27, 1865 | ~8 M_{w} | | |
| November 4, 1866 | ~7 M_{w} | | |
| August 17, 1893 | ~7 M_{w} | | |
| September 10, 1893 | ~7 M_{w} | | |
| March 4, 1894 | ~7 M_{w} | | |
| August 31, 1894 | ~7 M_{w} | | |
| September 2, 1894 | ~8 M_{w} | | |
| March 29, 1934 | ~8 M_{w} | | |
| October 22, 1940 | 7 M_{w} | | |
| November 10, 1940 | 7.7 M_{w} | Vrancea County, Romania | |
| March 4, 1977 | 7.2 M_{w} | Vrancea County, Romania | |
| August 31, 1986 | 7.2 M_{w} | Vrancea County, Romania | |
| May 31, 1990 | ~7.0 M_{w} | Vrancea County, Romania | |
| October 28, 2004 | 5.8 M_{w} | Vrancea County, Romania | |
| April 25, 2009 | 5 M_{w} | Vrancea County, Romania | |
| October 6, 2013 | 5.5 M_{w} | Vrancea County, Romania | |
| November 22, 2014 | 5.5 M_{w} | Vrancea County, Romania | |
| September 24, 2016 | 5.0–6.0 M_{w} | Vrancea County, Romania | |
| November 18, 2026 | 5.7 M_{w} | Vrancea County, Romania | |
