= 1970 Dagestan earthquake =

Earthquake in Russia

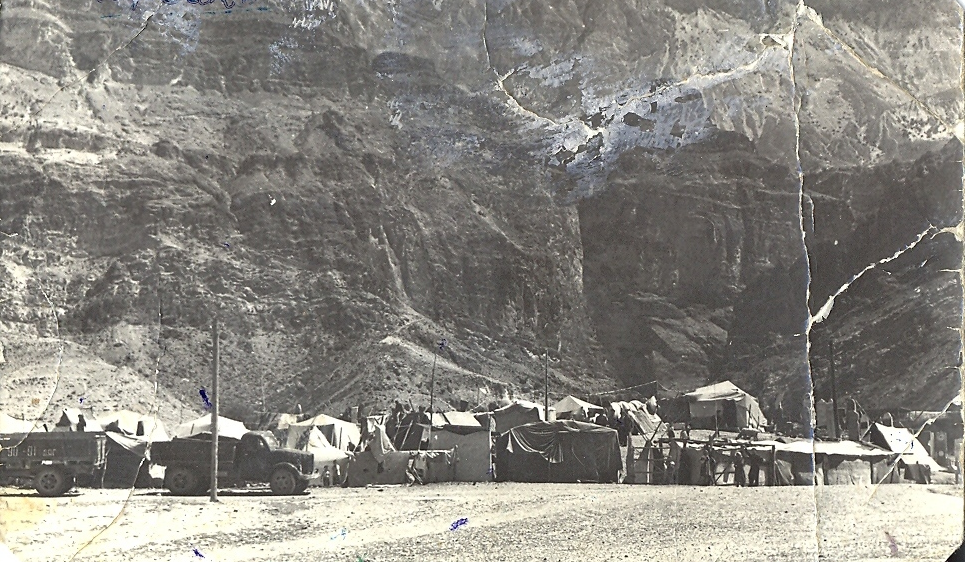
- Gimry villages after the earthquake.

- Location within Russia
- UTC time: 1970-05-14 18:12:26
- ISC event: 795586
- USGS-ANSS: ComCat
- Local date: May 14, 1970
- Local time: 21:12:26 (UTC+03:00)
- Magnitude: 6.7 M_{w}
- Depth: 13.0 km (8.1 mi)
- Epicenter: 43.191°N 47.140°E
- Areas affected: Dagestan, Soviet Union
- Max. intensity: MMI VIII (Severe)
- Foreshocks: 6.1 M_{w} at 09:20 (UTC)
- Casualties: 31 dead, 1,000+ injured

The 1970 Dagestan earthquake occurred on May 14 at 21:12 MSK, in the Republic of Dagestan, Soviet Union. It had a moment magnitude of 6.7, and a maximum Modified Mercalli intensity of VIII (Severe). It was preceded by foreshocks a few hours earlier. The epicenter was located on the territory of the Buynaksky District. As a result of the event, 25 percent of the territory of the republic was affected. The earthquake completely destroyed 257 settlements, including the cities of Makhachkala, Buynaksk, Kaspiysk, Khasavyurt and Kizilyurt. It caused at least 31 fatalities and up to 1,000 injured.

== Earthquake ==
The Caucasus region has a history of major earthquakes including the devastating 1988 Armenian earthquake, due to the tectonic relationship between the Eurasian and Arabian Plates. The earthquake of 1970 is the largest in the region since 1902. According to the Zarya Vostoka, a newspaper based on Tbilisi, the earthquake reached a maximum intensity of VIII and was felt across the Caucasus.

== Damage and casualties ==
The earthquake damaged 16 rural areas and four cities in Dagestan. At least 25 percent of the territory, where more than 50% of the population lived, was affected. The cities of Buynaksk, Khasavyurt, Kizilyurt and Makhachkala were particularly hard hit. The earthquake killed 31 people, injured more than 1,000 others and leaving 45,000 homeless. The death was minimalized by the fact that the earthquake was preceded by a strong foreshock at about 12:20 MSK. In the capital, Makhachkala, damage was extensive; many buildings constructed of brick were severely damaged or collapsed. Cracks in the plaster were observed, cases of partial damage or collapse of chimneys were noted. The upper part of the Chirkey Dam was damaged, but the dam itself remained stable and was subsequently repaired. According to a press release by United Press International from Moscow, the earthquakes collapsed homes, set off rockslides, opened fissures, and triggered tidal waves which inundated sand dunes along the Caspian Sea coastline.

== See also ==
- List of earthquakes in 1970
- List of earthquakes in Russia
