= Aleutian Trench =

Oceanic trench along the southern coastline of Alaska and the Aleutian Islands

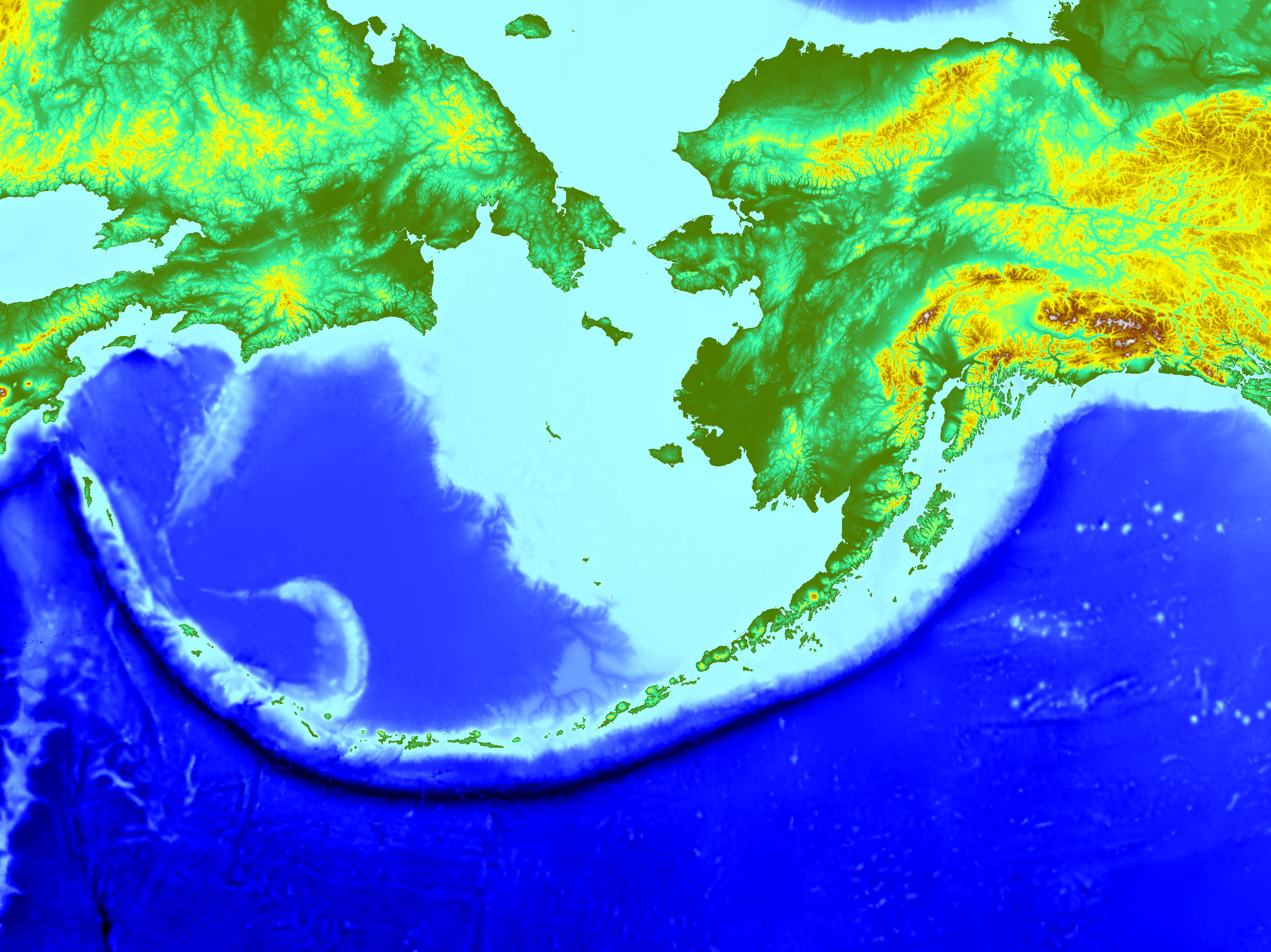
Map of the Aleutian Trench

The Aleutian Trench (or Aleutian Trough) is an oceanic trench along a convergent plate boundary which runs along the southern coastline of Alaska and the Aleutian Islands. The trench extends for 3,400 kilometres (2,100 mi) from a triple junction in the west with the Ulakhan Fault and the northern end of the Kuril–Kamchatka Trench, to a junction with the northern end of the Queen Charlotte Fault system in the east. It is classified as a "marginal trench" in the east as it runs along the margin of the continent. The subduction along the trench gives rise to the Aleutian Arc, a volcanic island arc, where it runs through the open sea west of the Alaska Peninsula. As a convergent plate boundary, the trench forms part of the boundary between two tectonic plates. Here, the Pacific plate is being subducted under the North American plate at a dip angle of nearly 45°. The rate of closure is 7.5 centimetres (3 in) per year.

The Pacific plate's subduction under the North American plate leads to increased faulting. This subduction began in the Early Cretaceous and continues into the present day. Within and near the Aleutian Island arc and depending on the location, there is thrust faulting, strike-slip faulting, and normal faulting. These result in an increased amount of seismic activity. Earthquakes can reach magnitudes between 7–8.5.

== Trench morphology ==
The north side of the trench slopes 3°–4° and the south side 1°–4°. The deepest part of the Aleutian trench has been measured at 7,822 metres (25,663 ft) at 51.21°N, 174.83°E., located about 145 kilometres (90 mi) SSW of Buldir Island.

Center pressure: 10,762 pounds per square inch (732.3 atm; 74.20 MPa). Variations in total magnetic intensity (residual) of more than 600 γ (600 nanoteslas) were found in the center of the trench and more than 1100 γ on the southern flank.

== Associated seismicity ==
The subduction of the Pacific plate below the North American plate along the Aleutian Trench is associated with numerous earthquakes. Several of these earthquakes are notable for their size and/or associated tsunamis.

- June 10–11, 1585 Aleutian Islands earthquake: A misdated tsunami legend in the Sanriku coast of Japan was dismissed and inferred to be from a vaguely–documented tsunami event in Miyagi Prefecture on June 11, 1585. Evidence of a large tsunami in the 16th century was also discovered in the Hawaiian Islands in the form of deposits. Oral records from the native residents described a tsunami-like event killing many people. Modelling of a tsunami from an earthquake of 9.25 M_{w} in the Aleutian Islands proved consistent with the descriptions and paleotsunami evidences.
- April 1, 1946 Aleutian Islands earthquake: This magnitude 8.6 earthquake occurred offshore Unimak Island, and caused only minor damage on land. However, the shaking generated a tsunami which killed 5 US Coast Guard personnel on the island, destroying the Scotch Cap Light, and causing damage on other Aleutian Islands and North and South America. In Hilo, Hawaii, the tsunami killed 159 and caused extensive damage.
- March 9, 1957 Andreanof Islands earthquake: This magnitude 8.6 earthquake occurred south of the Andreanof Islands. The earthquake itself caused damage on Adak Island and Umnak Island and generated a Pacific-wide tsunami. The tsunami destroyed two villages in the Hawaiian Islands. The tsunami was recorded as far away as Chile.
- March 27, 1964 Alaska earthquake: Lasting four minutes and thirty-eight seconds, the magnitude 9.2 megathrust earthquake remains the most powerful earthquake recorded in North American history, and the second most powerful earthquake recorded in world history. Nine hundred and seventy kilometres (600 mi) of fault ruptured at once and moved up to 18 metres (60 ft), releasing about 500 years of stress buildup. Most damage directly from the earthquake was in Anchorage, Alaska and the surrounding areas; a Pacific-wide tsunami caused destruction as far away as Crescent City, California. The death toll from both earthquake and tsunami was 131.
- February 4 1965 Rat Islands earthquake: This magnitude 8.7 earthquake triggered a tsunami that struck Shemya Island and was observed around the Pacific, but caused little damage.
- May 7, 1986 Andreanof Islands earthquake: This magnitude 7.9 earthquake caused damage on Adak Island and Atka Island. The resultant tsunami was recorded throughout the Pacific.
- On June 23, 2014, a 7.9 quake occurred near Little Sitkin Island, Alaska.
- On July 17, 2017, a magnitude 7.7 quake occurred 198 kilometres (123 mi) ESE of Nikolskoye, Russia.
- On January 23, 2018 Gulf of Alaska earthquake: a magnitude 7.9 quake occurred 278 kilometres (173 mi) Southeast of Kodiak, Alaska.
- On July 28, 2021, a magnitude 8.2 earthquake occurred 104 km SE of Perryville, Alaska
