= Osmussaar earthquake =

Earthquake in Estonia (1976)

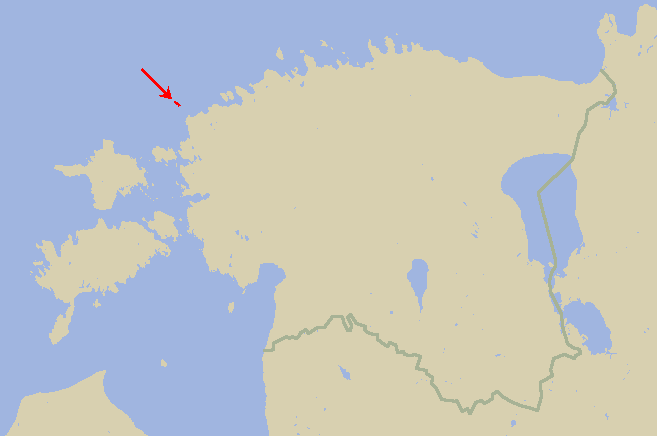

- Location within Estonia
- UTC time: 1976-10-25 08:39
- ISC event: 707568
- USGS-ANSS: ComCat
- Local date: 25 October 1976
- Local time: 11:39 MSK
- Magnitude: 4.5 mb
- Depth: 10–13 kilometres (6–8 mi)(GFZ); 33 kilometres (21 mi)(USGS)
- Epicenter: 59.157°N 23.725°E
- Max. intensity: MMI V (Moderate)

The Osmussaar earthquake occurred on 25 October 1976 near the north tip of Osmussaar, an island close to the coast of Estonia. Its hypocenter was 10–13 kilometres (6–8 mi) below ground level, and it was measured at 4.5–4.7 mb. The earthquake was largely felt in surrounding areas like north Estonia, south Finland and Sweden. Aftershocks also took place in November.

== Damage ==
The earthquake was the most powerful recorded in Estonia; it caused rockfalls along the north and northeastern coasts, and some houses suffered some structural damage.

== See also ==
- List of earthquakes in 1976
- Geology of Estonia
