= Kamchatka earthquakes =

Earthquakes in the Kamchatka Peninsula, far eastern Russia

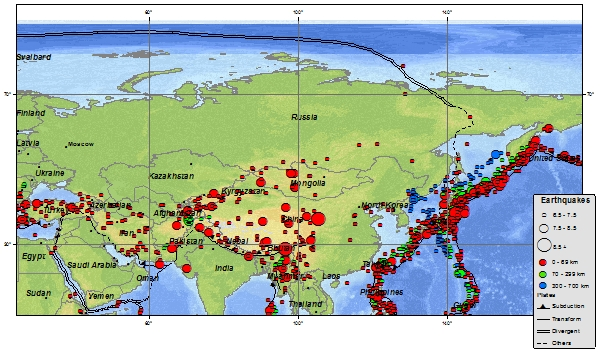
Map of earthquakes occurring in and around Russia (1900–2012). Most of this seismicity is in the Kamchatka area.

Many major earthquakes have occurred in the region of the Kamchatka Peninsula in far eastern Russia. Events in 1737, 1841, February 1923, April 1923, 1952, and 2025 were megathrust earthquakes and caused tsunamis. There are many more earthquakes and tsunamis originating from the region.

== Tectonic setting ==
The southern part of the Kamchatka peninsula lies above the convergent plate margin where the Pacific plate is subducting beneath the Okhotsk microplate along the line of the Kuril–Kamchatka Trench. The rate of convergence between the two plates is about 86 mm per year. Earthquakes are generated by rupture along the megathrust boundary between the two plates, within the descending Pacific plate and within the overriding Okhotsk Plate. The northern part of the peninsula lies away from the convergent boundaries of the Kuril–Kamchatka Trench and the Aleutian Trench but across the boundary between two blocks within the North American plate, the Kolyma-Chukotka and Bering Sea microplates. This boundary accommodates both active shortening and right lateral strike-slip across a series of large SW–NE trending faults.

== 1737 earthquake ==
The epicentre of the October 17, 1737, earthquake was located at a depth of 40 km (25 miles). A magnitude of 9.3M_{w} has been estimated.

== 1841 earthquake ==
An earthquake of estimated magnitude of 9.0 M_{w} on May 17, 1841, with its epicenter just off the coast, triggered a massive tsunami.

== 1923 earthquakes ==
On February 4, 1923, an earthquake of estimated magnitude 8.4 M_{w} triggered a 7.6-meter tsunami that caused considerable damage in Kamchatka, with three reported deaths. The tsunami was still 6 meters high when it reached Hawaii, causing at least one death. On April 14, 1923, a magnitude 8.2 M_{w} earthquake and tsunami occurred, causing a large tsunami runoff near Ust' Kamchatsk, leaving a deposit studied by Minoura and others.

== 1954 earthquake ==
The main earthquake struck on November 5, 1952. Initially assigned a magnitude of 8.2, it was revised to 9.0 M_{w} in later years. A large tsunami followed, causing destruction and casualties on the Kamchatka Peninsula and the Kuril Islands. Hawaii was also affected, with damage estimated at up to US$1 million and livestock losses, but no human casualties were recorded. Japan reported no casualties or damage. The tsunami reached Alaska, Chile, and New Zealand.

The hypocentre was located at a depth of 21.6 km (13.4 mi). The length of the subduction zone rupture was 600 km (370 mi). Aftershocks were recorded over an area of approximately 247,000 km^{2} (95,000 sq mi), at depths between 40 and 60 km (25 and 37 mi). A recent analysis of tsunami distribution, based on historical and geological records, provides insight into the distribution of rupture slip.

== 1959 earthquake ==
On May 4, 1959, an earthquake of magnitude 8.3 M_{w} occurred at a hypocentral depth of 55 km, with a maximum felt intensity of VIII.

== 2006 earthquake ==
The Koryak Autonomous Okrug region was struck by a magnitude 7.6 M_{w} earthquake on April 21, 2006. Numerous aftershocks followed, including two magnitude 6.6 M_{w} earthquakes on April 30 and May 23. This earthquake occurred due to a reverse fault at the boundary between two microplates of the North American Plate. The event created a surface rupture zone 140 km.

== 2020 earthquake ==
On March 25, 2020, a magnitude 7.5 M_{w} earthquake struck Russia. This was the largest to occur in Russia since the May 24, 2013, Okhotsk Sea earthquake. It was initially reported as a magnitude 7.8 M_{w}, before being downgraded to 7.5 M_{w}.

This earthquake occurred as a result of intraplate compressive faulting near the trench within the descending Pacific Plate. The epicenter was located in the large-slip zone of the 1952 Severo-Kurilsk earthquake, a magnitude 9.0 megathrust earthquake. Intense compressive activity is more common before and long after large compressional events along coupled zones, suggesting an accumulation of interplate deformation.

In Petropavlovsk-Kamchatsky, 460 kilometres (290 mi) from the epicenter, the intensity was felt as a Modified Mercalli intensity scale V (moderate); objects fell inside buildings, and people ran to the streets for safety.

A tsunami warning was issued immediately after the earthquake. The Pacific Tsunami Warning Center initially indicated the possibility of dangerous tsunami waves within 1,000 kilometers of the earthquake's epicenter. It added that earthquakes of this magnitude in the past had caused tsunamis far from the epicenter. A tsunami measuring approximately 0.5 m (1.6 ft) struck Kamchatka.

== 2025 earthquake ==
On July 30, 2025, a magnitude 8.8 M_{w} megathrust earthquake struck Kamchatka. It was the largest earthquake in Russia since 1952, the largest earthquake in the world since the 2011 Tōhoku earthquake, and the 6th largest earthquake since 1900. The earthquake occurred 10 days after a magnitude 7.4 M_{w} foreshock. Multiple large aftershocks have been recorded since then, including two 6.9 M_{w}, one 7.4 M_{w} and a 7.8 M_{w}.

== See also ==
- Ring of Fire – Tectonic belt of earthquakes and volcanoes
