= Foreshock =

Earthquake that occurs before a mainshock but is of lower magnitude

A foreshock is an earthquake that occurs before a larger seismic event – the mainshock – and is related to it in both time and space. The designation of an earthquake as foreshock, mainshock or aftershock is only possible after the full sequence of events has happened.

== Occurrence ==
Foreshock activity has been detected for about 40% of all moderate to large earthquakes, and about 70% for events of M>7.0. They occur from a matter of minutes to days or even longer before the main shock; for example, the 2002 Sumatra earthquake is regarded as a foreshock of the 2004 Indian Ocean earthquake with a delay of more than two years between the two events.

Some great earthquakes (M>8.0) show no foreshock activity at all, such as the M8.6 1950 India–China earthquake.

The increase in foreshock activity is very difficult to quantify for individual earthquakes but becomes apparent when combining the results of many different events. From such combined observations, the increase before the mainshock is observed to be of inverse power law type. This may either indicate that foreshocks cause stress changes resulting in the mainshock or that the increase is related to a general increase in stress in the region.

== Mechanics ==
The observation of foreshocks associated with many earthquakes suggests that they are part of a preparation process prior to nucleation. In one model of earthquake rupture, the process forms as a cascade, starting with a very small event that triggers a larger one, continuing until the main shock rupture is triggered. However, analysis of some foreshocks has shown that they tend to relieve stress around the fault. In this view, foreshocks and aftershocks are part of the same process. This is supported by an observed relationship between the rate of foreshocks and the rate of aftershocks for an event. In practice, there are two main conflicting theories about foreshocks: earthquake triggering process (described in SOC models and ETAS-like models) and the loading process by aseismic slip (nucleation models). This debate about the prognostic value of foreshocks is well known as Foreshock Hypothesis.

== Earthquake prediction ==
An increase in seismic activity in an area has been used as a method of predicting earthquakes, most notably in the case of the 1975 Haicheng earthquake in China, where an evacuation was triggered by an increase in activity. However, most earthquakes lack obvious foreshock patterns and this method has not proven useful, as most small earthquakes are not foreshocks, leading to probable false alarms. Earthquakes along oceanic transform faults do show repeatable foreshock behaviour, allowing the prediction of both the location and timing of such earthquakes. Ring shaped patterns of foreshocks may precede strong earthquakes.

== Examples of earthquakes with foreshock events ==
- The strongest recorded mainshock that followed a foreshock is the 1960 Valdivia earthquake, which had a magnitude of 9.5 M_{W}.

Foreshock Date (Delay)	Magnitude (Foreshock)	Location	Date	Depth	Magnitude (Mainshock)	Intensity (MMI)	Name	Type	Comments
April 4, 1904 (23 minutes)	6.3 M_{w}	Blagoevgrad region, Bulgaria	April 4, 1904	15 km	7.0 M_{w}	X-XI	1904 Kresna earthquakes	Normal	
May 21, 1960 (1 day)	8.1 M_{w}	Arauco Province, Chile	May 22, 1960	35 km	9.5 M_{w}	XII	1960 Valdivia earthquake	Megathrust	
November 2, 2002 (2 years)	7.3 M_{w}	Sumatra, Indonesia	December 26, 2004	30 km	9.2 M_{w}	IX	2004 Indian Ocean earthquake and tsunami	Megathrust	
October 20, 2006 (10 months)	6.4 M_{w}	Ica Region, Peru	August 15, 2007	35 km	8.0 M_{w}	VIII	2007 Peru earthquake	Megathrust	
January 23, 2007 (3 months)	5.2 M_{L}	Aysén Region, Chile	April 21, 2007	6 km	6.2 M_{w}	VII	2007 Aysén Fjord earthquake	Strike-slip	
March 9, 2011 (2 days)	7.3 M_{w}	Miyagi Prefecture, Japan	March 11, 2011	30 km	9.0 M_{w}	IX	2011 Tōhoku earthquake and tsunami	Megathrust	
March 16, 2014 (15 days)	6.7 M_{w}	Tarapacá Region, Chile	April 1, 2014	20.1 km	8.2 M_{w}	VIII	2014 Iquique earthquake	Megathrust	
April 14, 2016 (2 days)	6.2 M_{w}	Kumamoto Prefecture, Japan	April 16, 2016	11 km	7.0 M_{w}	IX	2016 Kumamoto earthquakes	Strike-slip	
April 22, 2017 (2 days)	4.8 M_{w}	Valparaíso Region, Chile	April 24, 2017	24.8 km	6.9 M_{w}	VII	2017 Valparaiso earthquake	Thrust	
July 4, 2019 (1 day)	6.4 M_{w}	California, United States	July 5, 2019	10.7 km	7.1 M_{w}	IX	2019 Ridgecrest earthquakes	Strike-slip	
December 28, 2020 (1 day)	5.2 M_{w}	Central Croatia	December 29, 2020	10 km	6.4 M_{w}	IX	2020 Petrinja earthquake	Strike-slip	
March 5, 2021 (2 hours)	7.4 M_{w}	Kermadec Islands, New Zealand	March 5, 2021	55.6 km	8.1 M_{w}	VIII	2021 Kermadec Islands earthquake	Megathrust	
July 20, 2025 (10 days)	7.4 M_{w}	Kamchatka Peninsula, Russia	July 30, 2025	20.7 km	8.8 M_{w}	IX	2025 Kamchatka Peninsula earthquake	Megathrust	

- Note: dates are in local time
