= 1841 Kamchatka earthquake =

Earthquake in present-day Russia

- Location within Kamchatka Krai
- UTC time: 21:30
- Local date: May 17, 1841
- Local time: 08:00
- Magnitude: 9.0+ M_{w} 9.0+ M_{t} 8.4 M_{fa}
- Epicenter: 52.5°N 159.5°E
- Type: Megathrust
- Areas affected: Kamchatka
- Max. intensity: MSK-64 IX (Destructive)
- Tsunami: 15 meters
- Aftershocks: Until March 1842
- Casualties: Unknown

The 1841 Kamchatka earthquake occurred in the Pacific Ocean on May 17 at 08:00 local time. The earthquake had an epicenter off the Russian Far East's Kamchatka Peninsula. With an estimated moment magnitude of 9.0 or higher, it is one of the largest to strike the region. A large tsunami with a run-up height of up to 15 metres (49 ft) struck the coast.

== Tectonic setting ==
The earthquake occurred off the Kamchatka Peninsula's east coast, which runs parallel to the Kuril-Kamchatka Trench, the area where the Pacific and Okhotsk Sea plates converge. Being older and therefore denser, the Pacific subducts beneath the Kamchatka Peninsula, which sits on the Okhotsk Sea Plate. These two plates meet along a convergent boundary, marked by the trench. The subduction zone is seismogenic and produces Kamchatka earthquakes, which occasionally generate tsunamis; some of these megathrust earthquakes are very strong (such as the 1952 magnitude 9.0 earthquake, the fifth-largest ever recorded). Possibly the largest to have hit the peninsula was the 1737 magnitude 9.3 earthquake which generated a large tsunami as well.

== Earthquake ==
The earthquake was associated with thrust faulting on the subduction zone near the east coast of the Kamchatka Peninsula. According to the National Centers for Environmental Information, the earthquake felt area was used to estimate its magnitude at M_{fa} 8.4. A 2004 earthquake catalog placed both the tsunami magnitude (M_{t}) and moment magnitude (M_{w}) at 9.0, based on evaluating the available tsunami data. No information exists on the source area of the event due to the lack of tsunami records and observation. The 1841 event is thought to be one of a number of large M 8.5+ earthquakes "missing" in the seismological record due to having their magnitudes underestimated. According to Dr. Susan Hough of the U.S. Geological Survey, the earthquake magnitude was underestimated due to the assumption that it did not generate a large-enough tsunami. Earthquakes measuring 8.5 or greater are generally assumed to cause large tsunamis. At the American Geophysical Union fall meeting in 2013, she believes the magnitude could be up to 9.2.

== Impact ==
The earthquake struck the coast and was felt with a maximum intensity of VIII–IX at Petropavlovsk-Kamchatskiy. Up to 15 minutes of violent shaking was felt in the city. At least 50 stove chimneys on homes and government offices collapsed. Some homes suffered severe damage. Cliffs at the coast collapsed. Cathedral bells reportedly rang during the earthquake. The event caused a large tsunami with a maximum run-up height of 15 metres (49 ft) at the eastern coast. The tsunami washed away yurts belonging to the native population.

At Hilo, Hawaii, the tsunami measured 4.6 metres (15 ft). It is Hawaii's first historically recorded tsunami sourced from the Kamchatka Peninsula.

== See also ==
- Kamchatka earthquakes
- List of earthquakes in Russia
- List of tsunamis
- List of historical earthquakes
- List of megathrust earthquakes
