= Kuril–Kamchatka Trench =

Oceanic trench in the northwest Pacific

Coordinates: 47°30′N 155°21′E

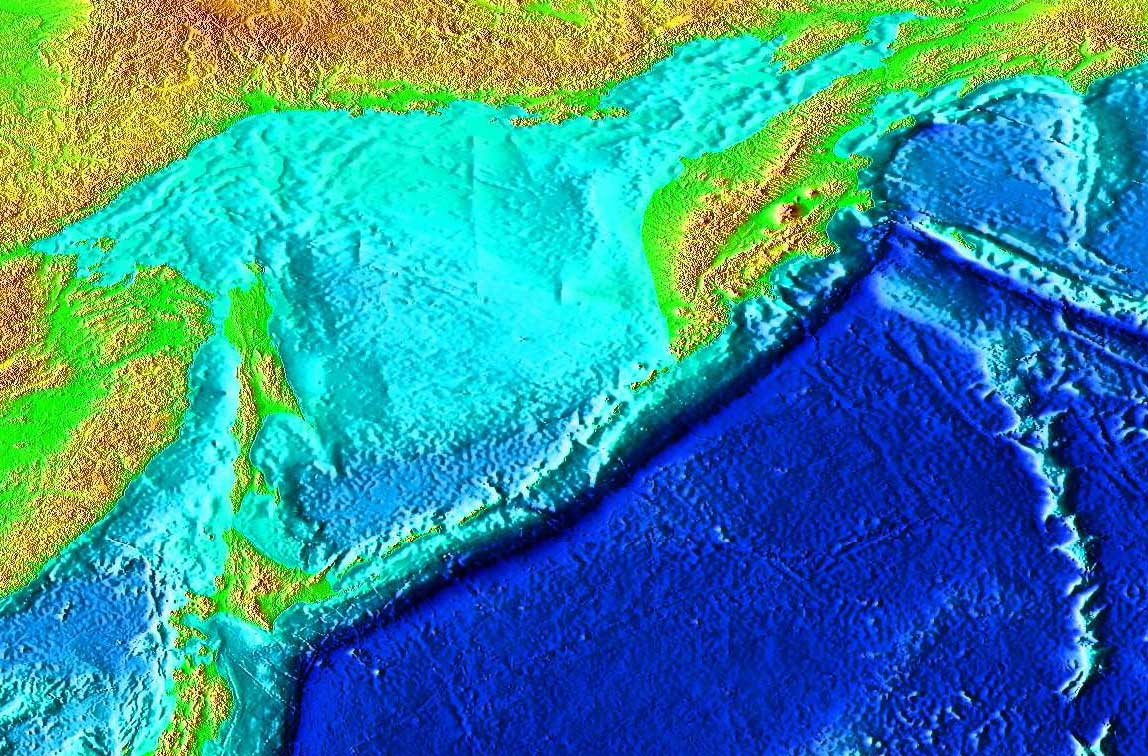
Topographic image of the northwest Pacific including the Kuril-Kamchatka Trench.

The Kuril–Kamchatka Trench or Kuril Trench (Russian: Курило-Камчатский жёлоб, Kurilo-Kamchatskii Zhyolob), known in Japan as Chishima Trench (Japanese: 千島海溝, Hepburn: Chishima Kaikō), is an oceanic trench in the northwest Pacific Ocean. It lies off the southeast coast of Kamchatka and parallels the Kuril Island chain to meet the Japan Trench east of Hokkaido. It extends from a triple junction with the Ulakhan Fault and the Aleutian Trench near the Commander Islands, Russia, in the northeast, to the intersection with the Japan Trench in the southwest.

The trench formed as a result of the subduction zone, which formed in the late Cretaceous, that created the Kuril island arc as well as the Kamchatka volcanic arc. The Pacific plate is being subducted beneath the Okhotsk plate along the trench, resulting in intense volcanism.

The maximum depth of the trench is reported in peer-reviewed academic papers as 9,600 meters.

== History ==
The trench was first discovered during an oceanographic and hydrographic survey by the USS Tuscarora, where the ship had detected a depth of 4655 fathoms or 8513 meters in 1874. Due to this recording the trench held the record of the deepest point in the world, beating out the Challenger expedition's recorded depth of 3875 fathoms or 7086 meters in the Mariana Trench, until it was overthrown in the following year by the Mariana Trench which it had just surpassed.

== Tectonics ==
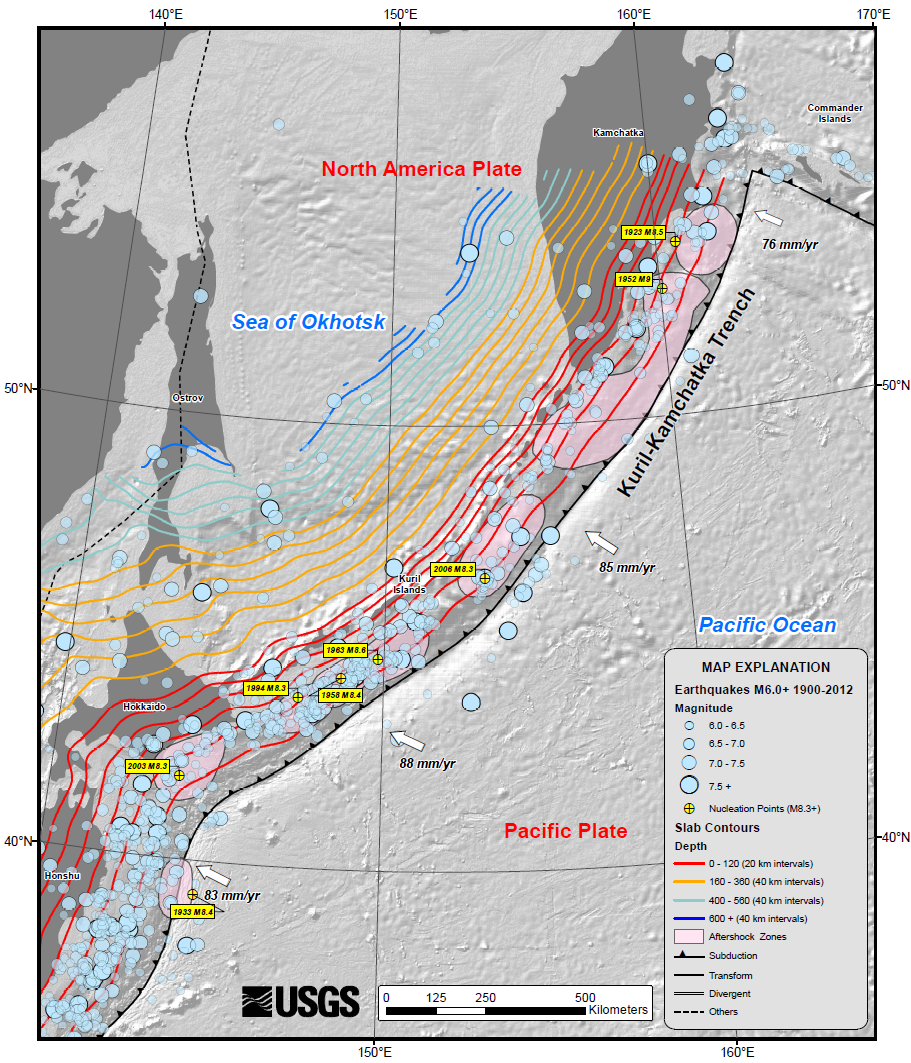
Map of earthquake locations, showing depth contours on top of downgoing slab

At the Kuril–Kamchatka Trench, the Pacific plate is subducting beneath the Okhotsk plate, a minor tectonic plate formerly considered to be part of the North American plate. The convergence rate ranges from ≈75 mm (3.0 in)/yr in the north to ≈83 mm (3.3 in)/yr at the southern end. Obliquity of convergence increases to the south, where the transpressional stress is partitioned into trench-normal thrust earthquakes and trench-parallel strike-slip earthquakes. This partitioning results in westward translation of the Kurile forearc relative to the North American plate.

== Associated seismicity ==
Major earthquakes associated with the subduction zone:

| Date | Location | Magnitude |
|---|---|---|
| 3 February 1923 | Kamchatka, Russia | 8.4 |
| 13 April 1923 | Kamchatka, Russia | 8.2 |
| 2 March 1933 | Sanriku-oki, Japan | 8.6 |
| 4 November 1952 | Kamchatka, Russia | 9.0 |
| 6 November 1958 | Kuril Islands, Russia | 8.4 |
| 13 October 1963 | Kuril Islands, Russia | 8.5 |
| 4 October 1994 | Kuril Islands, Russia | 8.3 |
| 25 September 2003 | Hokkaido, Japan | 8.3 |
| 15 November 2006 | Kuril Islands, Russia | 8.3 |
| 24 May 2013 | Sea of Okhotsk | 8.3 |
| 18 July 2017 | Kamchatka, Russia | 7.8 |
| 25 March 2020 | Kamchatka, Russia | 7.5 |
| 29 July 2025 | Kamchatka, Russia | 8.8 |

== See also ==
- Kamchatka earthquakes
- Ring of Fire
