= 1952 Severo-Kurilsk earthquake =

Fifth most powerful on record; in Russia

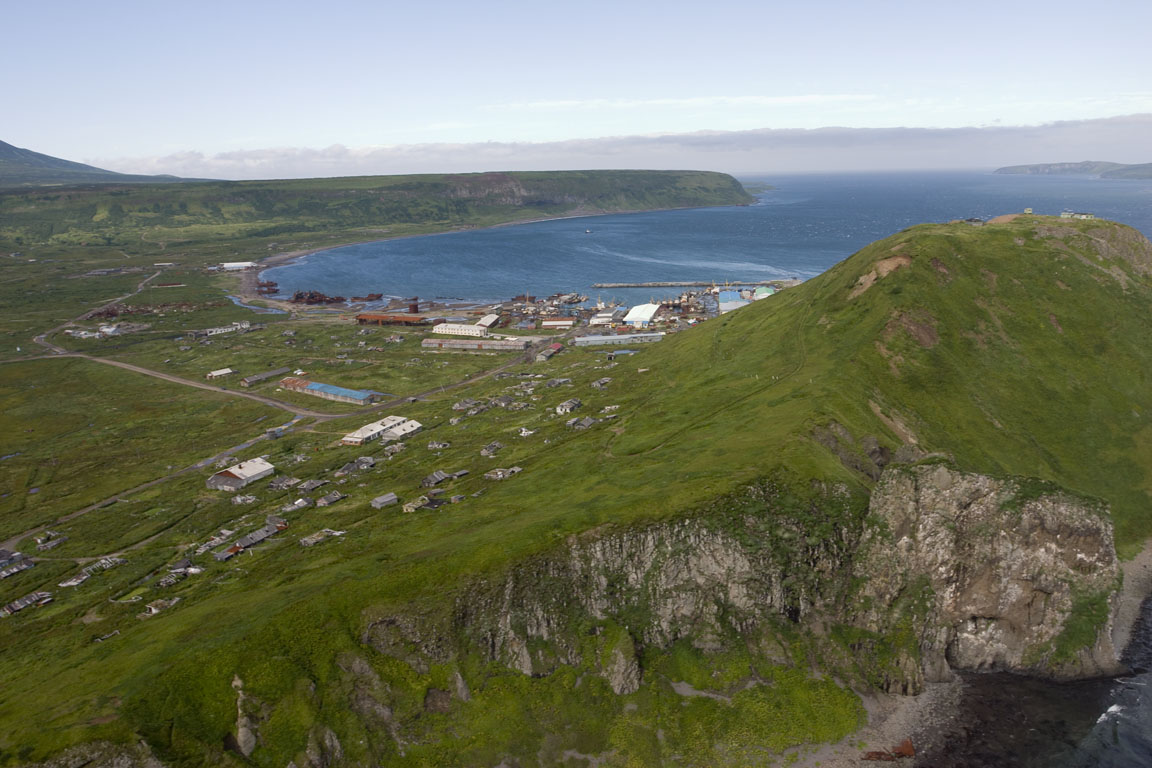
- Helicopter view of the place where Severo-Kurilsk was located before the 1952 tsunami. The site of the modern town, rebuilt at higher level, is not visible.

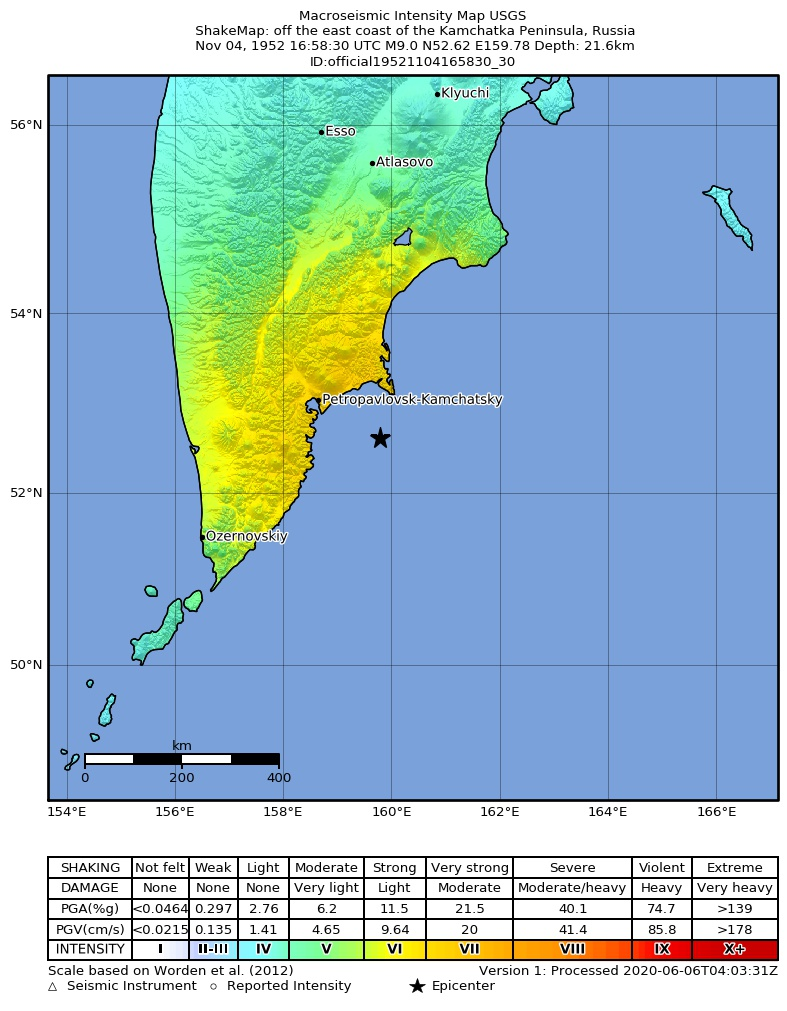

- Location within Kamchatka Krai
- UTC time: 1952-11-04 16:58:30
- ISC event: 893648
- USGS-ANSS: ComCat
- Local date: November 5, 1952
- Local time: 04:58:30
- Magnitude: 8.8–9.0 M_{w}
- Depth: 21.6 km (13 mi)
- Epicenter: 52.3°N 161.0°E
- Max. intensity: MMI XI (Extreme)
- Tsunami: 18 m (59 ft)
- Casualties: 2,336–14,000 dead

The 1952 Severo-Kurilsk earthquake struck off the coast of the Kamchatka Peninsula. The M_{w} 8.8–9.0 earthquake occurred on 5 November 1952 at 04:58 local time, triggering a major tsunami that struck the Kuril Islands and the Kamchatka Peninsula within the Russian SFSR in the Soviet Union. This led to the destruction of many settlements in Sakhalin Oblast and Kamchatka Oblast, while the main impact struck the town of Severo-Kurilsk. It remains the most powerful earthquake ever recorded in Russia and the fifth most powerful earthquake ever recorded in the world since modern seismography began in 1900. It was also the deadliest and most damaging tsunami recorded in Russia.

== Tectonic setting ==
The earthquake occurred off the Kamchatka Peninsula's east coast, which runs parallel to the Kuril-Kamchatka Trench, the area where the Pacific and Okhotsk Sea plates converge. Being older and therefore denser, the Pacific subducts beneath the Kamchatka Peninsula, which sits on the Okhotsk Sea plate. These two plates meet along a convergent boundary, marked by the trench. The subduction zone is seismogenic and produces Kamchatka earthquakes, which occasionally generate tsunamis. Earthquakes associated with the Kuril-Kamchatka subduction zone are of the megathrust type. The subduction zone is associated with at least two known ~9.0 M_{w} earthquakes in the pre-instrumental period; 1737 and 1841. The 1737 earthquake measured M_{w} 9.0–9.3, and generated the largest known tsunami (60 meters) on the peninsula. Another M_{w} 9.0 earthquake struck the peninsula on May 17, 1841. It generated a tsunami up to 15 meters high and was felt with a maximum intensity of VIII–IX.

== Earthquake ==
Estimates of the moment magnitude range from (M_{w}) 8.8 to 9.0. The earthquake ruptured a patch of the subduction zone which extends from the northern portion of Onekotan to Cape Shipunskii; approximately 700 km (430 mi) long. The rupture width is estimated at 150–200 km (93–124 mi). Slip on the rupture patch occurred in a direction perpendicular to the Kuril-Kamchatka Trench. Unlike most large subduction earthquakes, the greatest fault movement in the 1952 event occurred at deeper depth instead of being closer to the trench. Movement on the fault was inferred to be as deep as 40 km (25 mi) and possibly 60–80 km (37–50 mi). Little slip occurred at the trench, leaving it locked and accumulating unreleased elastic energy.

Two years prior to the mainshock, a sequence of foreshocks commenced near the epicenter location, as well as the southern edge of the rupture. The aftershock sequence one month after the mainshock was used to define the northern extent of slip.

== Tsunami ==
A tsunami was generated 130 kilometers (70 nmi; 81 mi) off of Kamchatka, striking Severo-Kurilsk with three waves about 15–18 meters (49–59 ft) high.

After the earthquake the majority of the Severo-Kurilsk citizens fled to the surrounding hills, where they escaped the first wave. However, most of them returned to the town and were killed by the second wave. The true number of deaths may have been calculated by authorities, but hidden by late Stalinist censorship. The common estimates vary widely at between 2,336 and 14,000.

Severo-Kurilsk was then rebuilt on higher location farther inland, with only the port remaining on the seashore.

== Hawaii property damage ==
Economic damage in Hawaii came from the tsunami waves, where property damage was between $800,000 and $1,000,000 USD in 1952 dollars. The waves caused a cement barge to fly into a freighter in Honolulu harbor. In Hilo, an expensive boathouse was destroyed. A small portion of the bridge connecting Hilo to nearby Coconut Island was damaged from the strong waves along with houses in the area being stripped from their foundations. Coast guard buoys were torn from their anchors.

== See also ==
- List of earthquakes in 1952
- List of earthquakes in Russia
- Russian Tsunami Warning System
- Russian System of Disaster Management
- 2025 Kamchatka Peninsula earthquake
