= 1737 Kamchatka earthquake =

Earthquake in present-day Russia

- Location within Kamchatka Krai
- UTC time: 1737-10-16 16:00:00
- Local date: October 17, 1737
- Local time: 03:00
- Magnitude: 9.0–9.3 M_{w} 8.3–8.5 M_{s}
- Depth: 40 km (25 mi)
- Epicenter: 52.5°N 159.5°E
- Type: Megathrust
- Areas affected: Kamchatka, present-day Russia
- Tsunami: Yes
- Casualties: Many natives killed

The 1737 Kamchatka earthquake occurred on October 17 near the southern tip of present-day Russia's Kamchatka Peninsula. The shock was felt at approximately 03:00 local time or 16:00 UTC by residents on the peninsula and Kuril Islands. The earthquake struck at a shallow depth of roughly 40 km (25 miles) beneath the peninsula with an estimated magnitude of 9.0–9.3 on the moment magnitude scale.

== Earthquake ==
The earthquake was associated with thrust faulting on the subduction zone marked by the Kuril-Kamchatka Trench. Calculation of the earthquake magnitude using tsunami data yielded a moment magnitude of 9.3.

Studies of the earthquake have placed the moment magnitude (M_{w}) of this earthquake at 9.0 to 9.3 and the surface-wave magnitude at 8.3 to 8.5. The tsunami generated by this earthquake is thought to be the most destructive and largest ever sourced from the region, alongside the 1952 earthquake. It is thought to be similar in size or possibly larger than the 1952 earthquake.

=== Descriptions ===
Stepan Krasheninnikov, a Russian explorer, reported the effects of the earthquake in his 1755 publication Description of Kamchatka Land. According to him, the earthquake lasted 15 minutes and was extremely violent. Many homes, constructed of wood and skin, belonging to the natives were obliterated. Many aftershocks were felt even when the tsunami struck. Aftershocks continued until the spring of 1738.

Co-seismic deformation along the coasts was so drastic that natives could not recognize the region or locate their settlements.

Along the Okhotsk Sea coast of Kamchatka, the earthquake and its effects were not noticeable.

== Tsunami ==
On the northern Kuril Islands, the tsunami had an estimated height of 20 metres (66 ft), and 30 metres (98 ft) in Avacha Bay. A maximum tsunami amplitude of 12 to 16 metres (39 to 52 ft) was estimated on Amchitka based on evaluating the height where driftwood was found on the island. When Georg Wilhelm Steller, a German scientist and explorer, visited the region in 1740, he noted the bones of marine mammals and driftwood discovered well above the shoreline. Trees were also found deposited on a ridge with a height of 230 feet (70 m). Krasheninnikov's book mentioned a tsunami measuring three sazhen or 6.3 metres (21 ft) inundating the coast. Another wave measuring 30 sazhen or 63 metres (207 ft) struck the coast, killing many natives and destroying their settlements. The force of the tsunami was so powerful that it stripped away dirt and sand, revealing the basement rocks of the Second Kuril Strait.

== See also ==
- 1841 Kamchatka earthquake – Another M_{w} 9.0 earthquake in the same region
- Kamchatka earthquakes
- List of earthquakes in Russia
- List of historical earthquakes
- List of megathrust earthquakes
- List of tsunamis
