= Okhotsk plate =

Minor tectonic plate in Asia

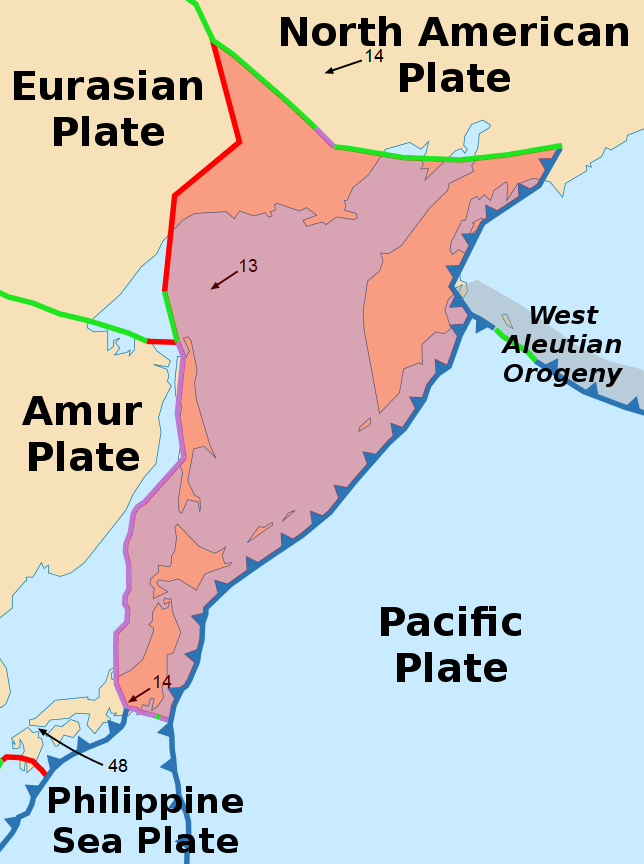
- Type: Minor
- Movement^{1}: South-west
- Speed^{1}: 13–14 mm/year
- Features: Hokkaido, Kamchatka Peninsula, Kantō, Kuril Islands, Magadan Oblast, Sakhalin Island, Sea of Okhotsk, Tōhoku
- ^{1}Relative to the African plate

The Okhotsk Plate is a minor tectonic plate covering the Kamchatka Peninsula, Magadan Oblast, and Sakhalin Island of Russia; Hokkaido, Kantō and Tōhoku regions of Japan; the Sea of Okhotsk, as well as the disputed Kuril Islands.

Japan's principal fault system is the zone where the Amur plate, the Eastern edge of the Eurasian plate, meets the Okhotsk plate, sometimes considered the Western edge of the North American plate.

It is controversial whether the northern Honshu, Okhotsk and North American plate constitute separate blocks or plates. "A slightly better fit to data is obtained" when the proposed blocks, Honshu and Okhotsk, are independent of North America, so some studies make this an assumption of their analysis.

The boundary is a left-lateral moving transform fault, the Ulakhan Fault originating from a triple junction in the Chersky Range.

== Proposed microplate ==
During the 1970s Japan was thought to be located on the Eurasian plate at a quadruple junction with the North American plate, the Pacific plate and the Philippines Plate. At that time the western boundary of the North American plate was drawn through southern Hokkaido. In the 1980s, the boundary of the North American plate was extended to the Japan Sea and the Itoigawa-Shizuoka Tectonic Line (I-STL) due to earthquakes occurring at the eastern edge of the Japan Sea. 1990s research supported a proposal of an Okhotsk microplate independent from the North American plate.

The southern boundary through I-STL was proposed by Peter Bird in 2003 and places Japan on the Okhotsk Plate. Other researchers have proposed a plate boundary that passed through Hokkaido during the Neogene. Under their proposal, northeastern Japan and western Hokkaido would have been part of the Eurasian plate in the Neogene.

== Geology ==
The boundary between Okhotsk microplate and Amurian microplate might be responsible for many strong earthquakes that occurred in the Sea of Japan as well as in Sakhalin Island, such as the M_{W}7.1 (M_{S}7.5 according to other sources) earthquake of May 27, 1995 in northern Sakhalin. The earthquake devastated the town of Neftegorsk, which was not rebuilt afterwards. Other notable intraplate earthquakes such as the 1983 Sea of Japan earthquake, 1993 Hokkaidō earthquake and the 2024 Noto earthquake have triggered tsunamis in the Sea of Japan.

The boundary between Okhotsk microplate and Pacific plate is a subduction zone, where the Pacific plate subducts beneath the Okhotsk Plate. Many giant megathrust earthquakes have occurred here, some of them among the largest ever recorded, including the Kamchatka earthquakes of 1737 (M_{w} 9.0-9.3), 1952 (M_{w} 9.0) and 2025 (M_{w} 8.8). Such strong megathrust earthquakes can also occur near the Kuril Islands, as the M_{w} 8.3 earthquake of November 15, 2006, Hokkaido, as the M_{w} 8.3 earthquake of September 26, 2003 and Honshu, as the M_{w} 9.0 earthquake of March 11, 2011.

GPS measurements and other studies show that the Okhotsk microplate is slowly rotating in a clockwise direction. Models indicate that it rotates 0.2 deg/Myr about a pole located north of Sakhalin.

== 2011 Tohoku megathrust earthquake ==
In 2011 a M_{w} 9.0–9.1 undersea megathrust earthquake caused by the subduction of the Pacific plate below the Okhotsk microplate. The worst affected areas in Tohoku, Japan experienced around six minutes of shaking. The main slip occurred at the "North America or Okhotsk plate".
