= February 1923 Kamchatka earthquake =

Earthquake

- Location within Kamchatka Krai
- UTC time: 1923-02-03 16:01:51
- ISC event: 911271
- USGS-ANSS: ComCat
- Local date: February 4, 1923
- Local time: 04:01
- Magnitude: 8.4 M_{w}
- Depth: 15 km (9.3 mi)
- Epicenter: 54.486°N 160.472°E
- Areas affected: Kamchatka, Russian SFSR, Soviet Union
- Max. intensity: MMI XI (Extreme)
- Foreshocks: 7.2 M_{w}^{(USGS)}1923-02-02
- Casualties: 3

The February 1923 Kamchatka earthquake occurred on 4 February 1923. The epicenter was on the southeastern coast of the Kamchatka Peninsula. The earthquake triggered a tsunami with wave heights up to eight metres, causing damage as far away as Hawaii. The maximum perceived Mercalli intensity was XI (Extreme). The tsunami caused two deaths in Kamchatka and one in Hawaii.

The earthquake happened 26 years before the U.S. had the capability to issue tsunami warnings, but Thomas Jaggar, the director of the Hawaiian Volcano Observatory, tried to warn the Hilo harbormaster about the possibility of a tsunami. His warning was not taken seriously and one fisherman was killed when the tsunami hit.

On 14 April that same year, a smaller M_{s}7.2 earthquake struck north of where the February earthquake was. It generated a much larger tsunami with run-ups of up to 30 meters, killing at least 36 people. This earthquake is considered a doublet of the April event because its moment magnitude was recalculated to be at ~8.0.

== See also ==
- List of earthquakes in 1923
- Kamchatka earthquakes
