= Natural disasters in Japan =

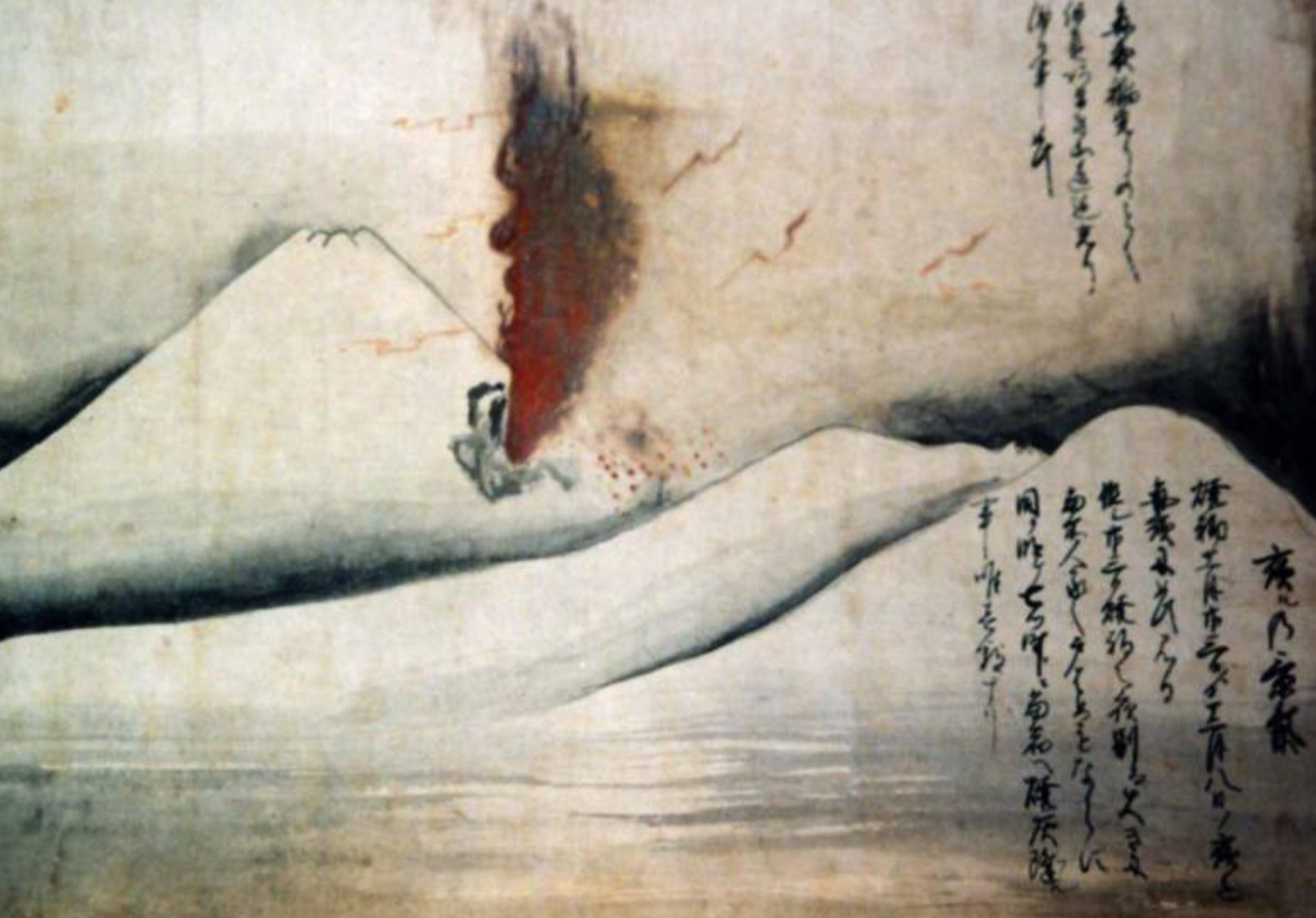
Depiction of the 1707 eruption of Mount Fuji

Japan is regularly affected by natural disasters, with the country being in the Ring of Fire. Two out of the five most expensive natural disasters in recent history have occurred in Japan, in 1995 (~6,500 deaths) and 2011 (~20,000 deaths) – the latter of which had also triggered the Fukushima Daiichi nuclear disaster. The most devastating recorded natural disaster to affect Japan by death toll was the 1923 Great Kantō earthquake, which killed ~105,000 and a further ~6,000 due to the Kantō Massacre in its immediate aftermath.

Japan has also been the site of some of the 10 worst natural disasters of the 21st century. Many types of natural disasters occur in Japan such as tsunamis, floods, typhoons, earthquakes, cyclones, and volcanic eruptions, leading to periodic disruptions in economic and social activities. The country has gone through thousands of years of natural disasters, affecting and shaping Japanese culture, economy, development, and social life.

== Volcanic eruptions ==
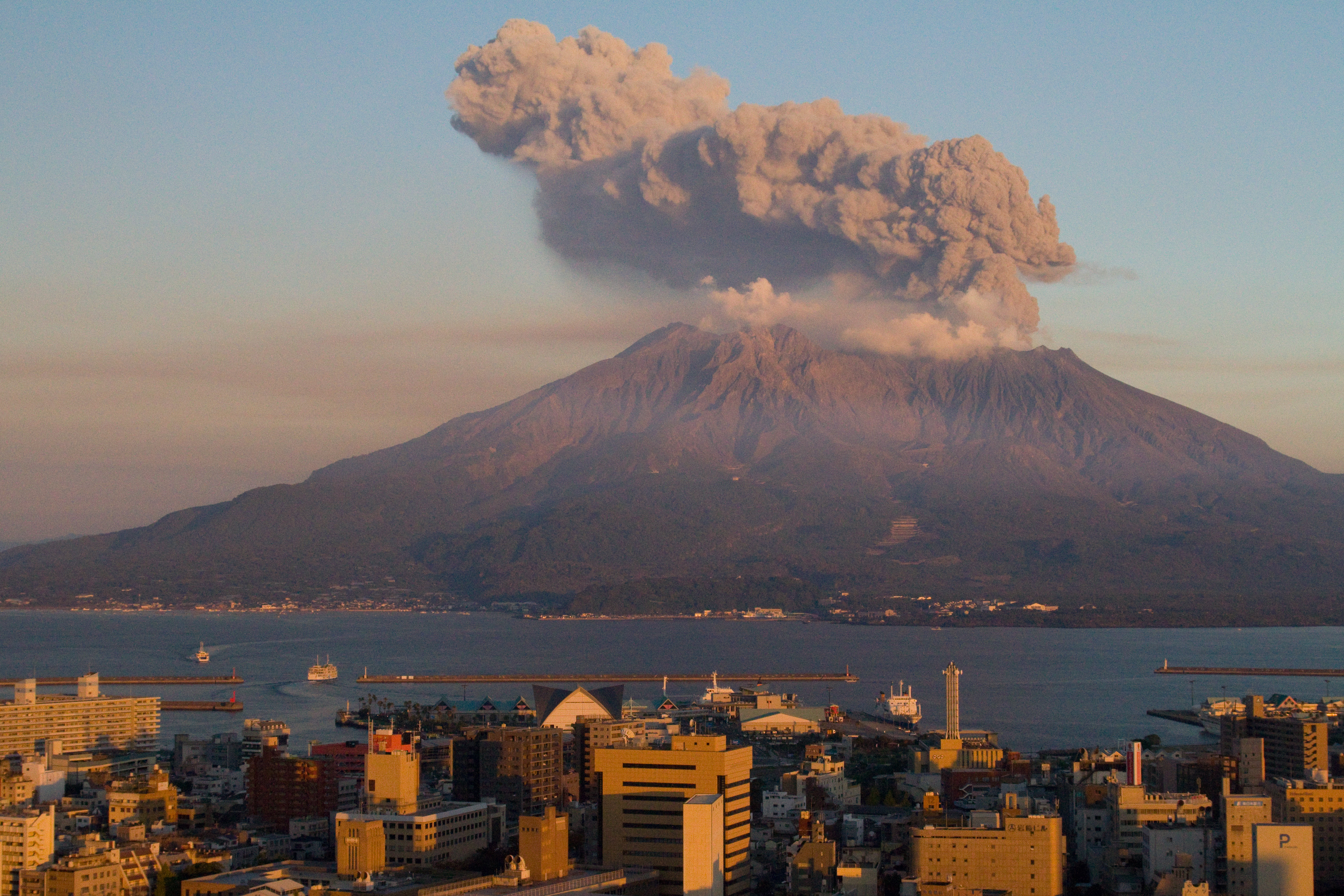
Volcano at Sakura-jima

Many volcanic eruptions have taken place in Japan.

=== List of major volcanic eruptions ===
Year	Volcano	Death toll	Note
1640	Hokkaido Komagatake	about 700	
1707	Mount Fuji	None	Main article: Hōei eruption
1721	Mount Asama	15	
1741	Oshima (Hokkaido)	1,467	Main article: 1741 eruption of Oshima–Ōshima and the Kampo tsunami
1779	Sakurajima	153	
1783	Mount Asama	1,151	Main article: Tenmei eruption
1785	Aogashima	130～140	
1792	Mount Unzen	about 15,000	Main article: 1792 Unzen earthquake and tsunami
1822	Mount Usu	103	
1888	Mount Bandai	461〜477	Main article: 1888 eruption of Mount Bandai
1900	Mount Adatara	72	
1902	Izu Torishima	125	
1914	Sakurajima	58～59	
1926	Mount Tokachi	144	
1940	Miyakejima	11	
1952	Bayonnaise Rocks	31	
1958	Mount Aso	12	
1991	Mount Unzen	43	Main article: 1991 eruption of Mount Unzen
2014	Mount Ontake	63	Main article: 2014 eruption of Mount Ontake

=== VEI-7 Volcanic eruptions ===
Mount Aso 4 pyroclastic flow and the spread of Aso 4 tephra. The pyroclastic flow reaches almost the whole area of Kyushu, and volcanic ash is deposited over 15 cm in a wide area from Kyushu to southern Hokkaido.

There are three VEI-7 volcanoes in Japan. These are the Aira Caldera, Kikai Caldera and Aso Caldera.

Mount Aso is the largest active volcano in Japan. Mount Aso had four eruptions 300,000 to 90,000 years ago. It emitted huge amounts of volcanic ash that covered all of Kyushu and up to Yamaguchi Prefecture.

VEI 7 eruptions have happened in the following locations of Japan.
Name	Zone	Location	Event / notes	Years ago before 1950 (Approx.)	Ejecta volume (Approx.)
Kikai Caldera		Japan, Ryukyu Islands	Akahoya eruption 5,300 BC	7,300	170 km^{3}
Aira Caldera		Japan, Kyūshū	Aira-Tanzawa ash	30,000	450 km^{3}
Aso Caldera		Japan, Kyūshū	Aso-4 pyroclastic flow	90,000	600 km^{3}
Mount Aso		Japan, Kyūshū	Four large eruptions between 300,000 and 90,000 years ago.	300,000	600 km^{3}

== Earthquakes ==
Japan has had a long history of earthquake catastrophes and seismic activity, the most deadly of which was the 1923 Great Kantō earthquake. In the 21st century, the most severe earthquake that occurred was the 2011 Tohoku earthquake and tsunami.

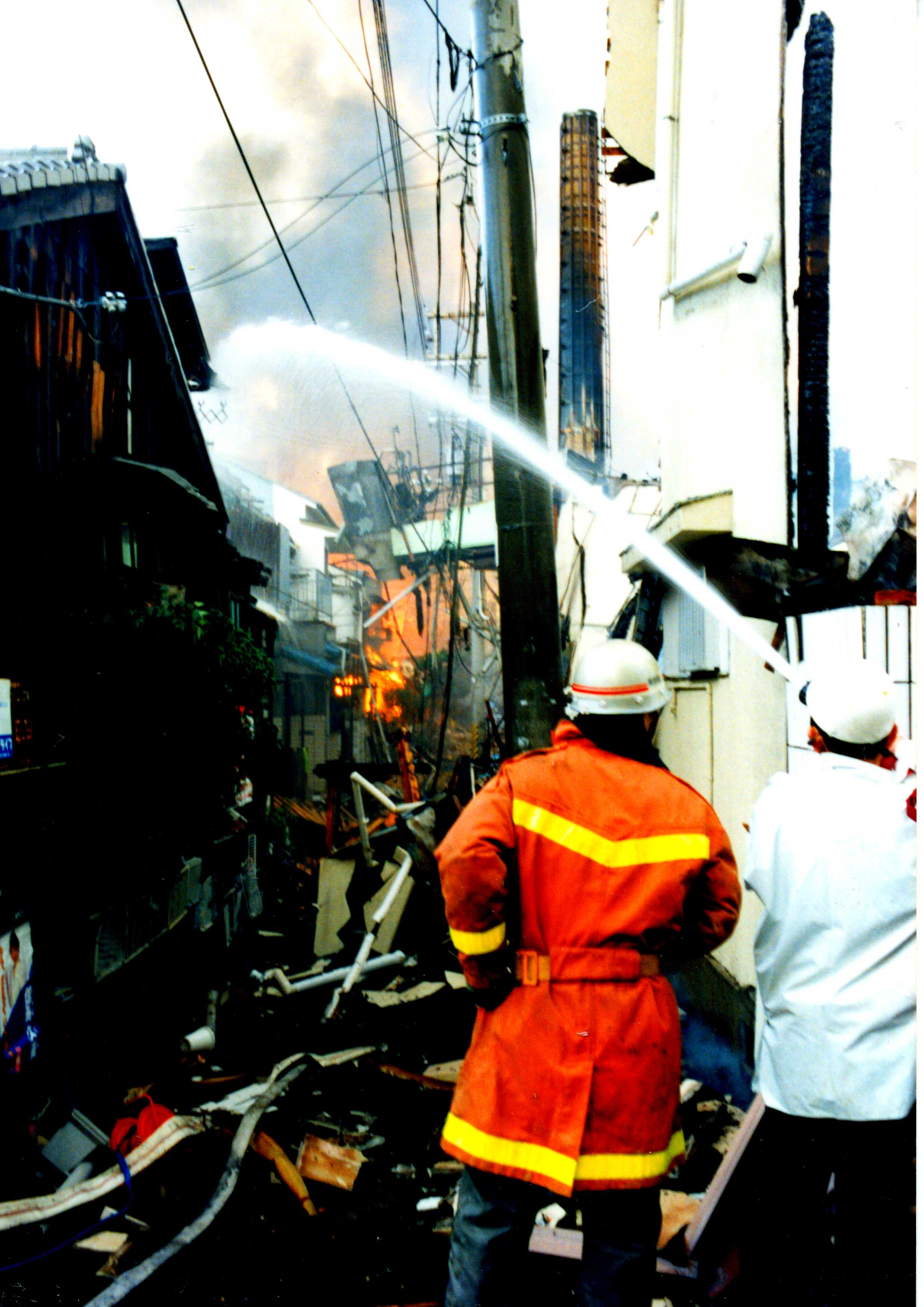
Firefighters attempting to stop a fire after the Great Hanshin earthquake

=== List of recent earthquakes in Japan ===
Location	Date	Estimated deaths
Hokkaido earthquake	1993, 12 July	202
Offshore Sanriku earthquake	1994, 28 December	3
Kobe earthquake	1995, 17 January	6,434
Ryukyu Islands earthquake	1998, 4 May	0
Geiyo earthquake	2001, 24 March	2
Hokkaido earthquake	2003, 26 September	1
Chuetsu earthquake	2004, 23 October	40
Fukuoka earthquake	2005, 20 March	1
Miyagi earthquake	2005, 16 August	0
Kuril Islands earthquake	2006, 15 November	0
Kuril Islands earthquake	2007, 13 January	0
Noto earthquake	2007, 25 March	1
Chuetsu Offshore earthquake	2007, 16 July	11
Iwate-Miyagi Nairiku earthquake	2008, 14 June	12
Izu Islands earthquake	2009, 9 August	0
Shizuoka earthquake	2009, 11 August	1
Ryukyu Islands earthquake	2010, 26 February	1
Bonin Islands earthquake	2010, 21 December	0
Tohoku earthquake	2011, 11 March	19,759
Miyagi earthquake aftershock	2011, 7 April	4
Fukushima earthquake	2011, 11 April	6
Fukushima earthquake aftershock	2011, 10 July	0
Izu Islands earthquake	2012, 1 January	0
Kamaishi earthquake	2012, 7 December	3
Chiba earthquake	2012, 14 March	3
2016 Kumamoto earthquake	2016, 16 April	277 (official)
Osaka earthquake	2018, 18 June	6 (official)
Hokkaido Eastern Iburi earthquake	2018, 8 September	44 (official)
Noto earthquake	2024, 1 January	755 (official)
2026 Kumamoto earthquake	2026, 28 July	38 (official)

== Mudslides ==
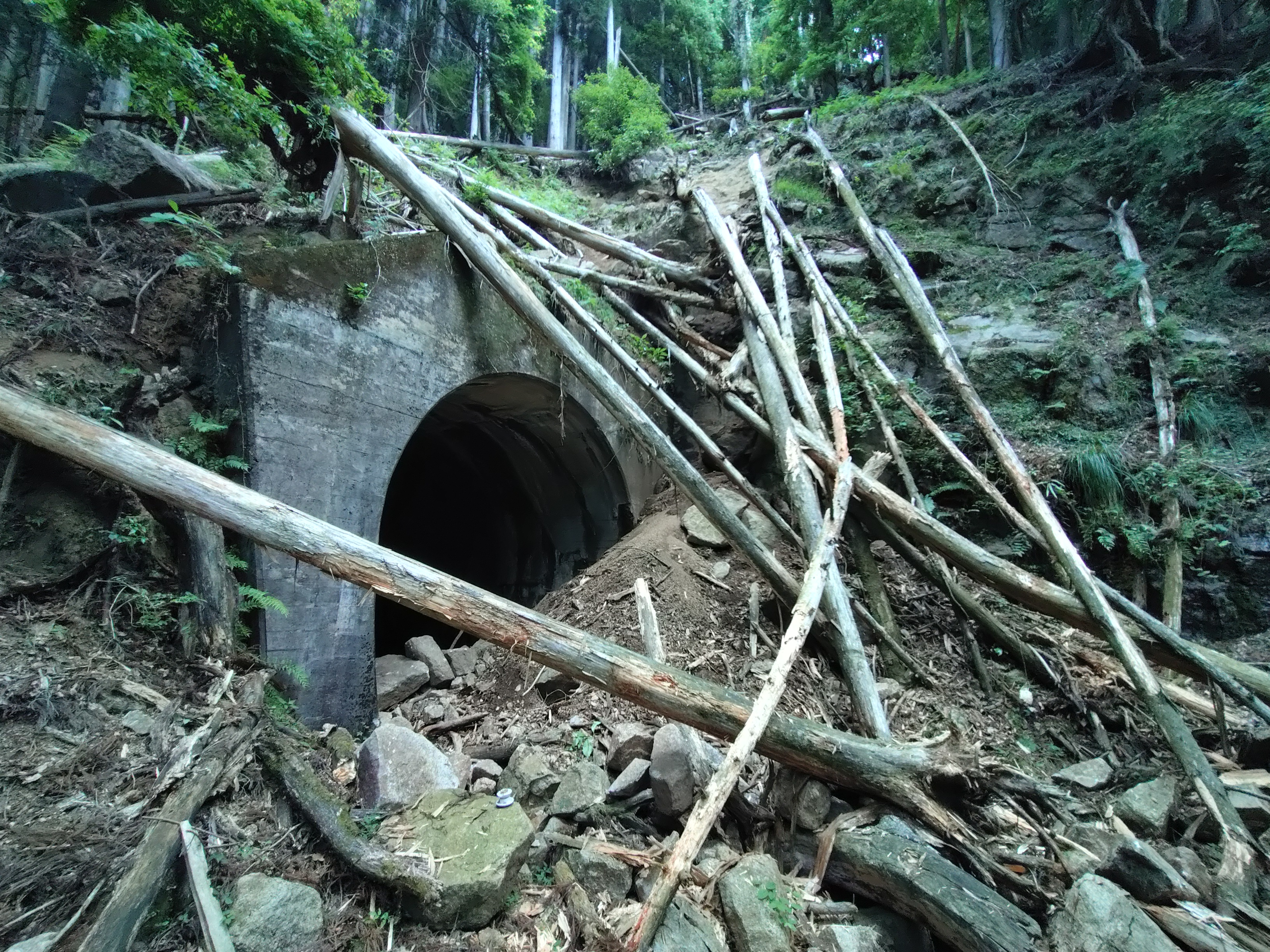
abandoned railway tunnel,Taguchi Railroad,Japan

A mudslide, or mudflow, occurs when rocks, sand, and earth are loosened and fall from hills and mountains due to earthquake, rain or snow. In Japan, over two-thirds of the land is mountainous and therefore prone to mudslides.

=== Major mudslide events ===
Japan has experienced several major mudslide events, often due to other natural disasters.

==== Mount Ontake ====
On September 14, 1984, the Otaki earthquake (magnitude 6.8) in Nagano Prefecture, Japan, caused a major mudslide on the south face of Mount Ontake, which reached speeds of 80~100 km/h. Heavy rain over several days prior to the quake contributed to causing the mudslide, known as "Ontake Kuzure," which took the lives of 29 people. After the disaster, barriers against mudslide were erected in nine locations at the foot of Mt. Ontake.

==== Wakayama and Nara ====
In September 2011, Tropical Storm Talas (2011), which formed and was named on August 25, made landfall over Japan, bringing heavy rain to the mountainous Kii Peninsula, and causing a mudslide, called "Shinsohokai," in Wakayama and Nara. "Shinsohokai" means that not only soil collapses, but also bedrock. In this case, houses were covered with earth and sand from the mudslide and there were many injured and killed.

==== Hiroshima ====
In June 2010, Hiroshima experienced heavy rains which caused severe damage, including mudslides and river floods; Shōbara had 64 mm rain in an hour and Hiroshima had 30–50 mm on June 12, 20-40mm on the 13th and 20-50mm on the 14th. Five people were killed and six injured; 1,787 houses were destroyed.

== Floods ==
Floods and tsunamis are imbedded in Japanese culture and history. Southern parts of some regions are under sea level like Kyushu, Shikoku and Okinawa. Rising oceans are also making the Tokyo metropolitan area, home to 38 million people, vulnerable to storm surges. Years of pumping up groundwater have caused some parts of the city to sink nearly 5 meters over the past century. This means that large parts of Tokyo are now below sea level and are only protected by outdated dikes.

With a population of 127 million, the population density is very high. Most residential and industrial areas are located in low-lying areas, along rivers; these areas are very vulnerable to river flooding and flash floods. According to a 1985 study, 49 percent of the population and 75 percent of businesses are located in flood-prone areas. Given population growth in the Kanto Plain, where Japan's second-longest river, the Tone, is located, these shares are likely higher today. Water pushed to shore by strong winds or typhoons and coinciding with tide can cause significant sea level rise. These kinds of situations are then called a storm surge. In addition, precipitation is an increasing cause of flooding in Japan.

=== Flood management ===
Flood management has been important in Japan for generations. The first form of flood management dates back to the 4th century when the Manda-no-tsutsumi (Manda Levee) was built at the Yodo River. Here a narrow path runs along the old river near the inhabited areas. Today there is a monument. Japan has many large-scale projects to protect its inhabitants from the water. For example, there is a lot of emphasis on breaking high waves and a lot of research is being done into the behavior of tsunamis. After the devastating tsunami of 2011, the Japanese government decided to protect all vulnerable villages and towns along the coast by building sea walls that range from 8.5 meters to 24 meters in height. As much as eleven billion is spent on building this 400-kilometer-long concrete wall. Inland, flood management in Japan is also important against river flooding. Many of these projects are also recognizable to us. The government is working on widening the river channels and building dikes. This is to limit the rise in a river's water level by increasing its cross-section and to prevent the land from flooding in times of flooding.

Management of floods include drainage basins, which are used to temporarily store the overflow of the river during a flood and to drain it again after the risk of flooding has passed. This prevents the downstream water levels from rising. In addition, they also include pumping stations; pumps are used to drain rainwater into the river in areas where the water level in the river is higher than the land. Lastly, dredging is also used. This is done to lower the water level in a river by deepening or dredging the river bed. Another important way of flood management is to create so-called shortcuts or shortcuts. The length of a river channel is shortened by straightening bends, so that flood water can flow through it quickly. And a flood management approach widely used by Japan is dams, such as the 186-meter high Kurobe Dam in Toyama Prefecture. These dams are huge, so it often takes years to build them. The function of these dams is to regulate the water flow upstream at the time of a flood, so that the flow is reduced downstream.

== Heatwaves ==
Heatwaves have become increasingly common in Japan. June 2022 has seen the worst heatwave in 150 years. In Japan, especially human fatalities in heatstroke from heatwave occur every year, mainly occur in June to September.

=== List of heatwaves death in Japan ===
Events	Date	Estimated deaths
1994 heatwaves	1994	589 (official)
2010 heatwaves	2010	1731 (official)
2013 heatwaves	2013	1077 (official)
2018 heatwaves	2018	1581 (official)
2019 heatwaves	2019	1224 (official)
2020 heatwaves	2020	1528 (official)
2022 heatwaves	2022	1477 (official)
2023 heatwaves	2023	1651 (official)
2024 heatwaves	2024	2160 (official)
2025 heatwaves	2025	1610 (official)

== See also ==
- List of disasters in Japan by death toll
