= Hokkaidō earthquake =

Hokkaidō earthquake may refer to:

- 1952 Tokachi earthquake
- 1973 Nemuro earthquake
- 1982 Urakawa earthquake
- 1993 Kushiro earthquake
- 1993 Okushiri earthquake
- 1994 Kuril Islands earthquake
- 2003 Tokachi earthquake
- 2018 Hokkaido Eastern Iburi earthquake
