= Chiba earthquake =

Chiba earthquake may refer to:

- 1987 Chiba earthquake
- 2005 Chiba earthquake
- 2012 Chiba earthquake
- 2021 Chiba earthquake
- 2023 Chiba earthquake
