= 1993 Hokkaidō earthquake =

1993 Hokkaidō earthquake

- 1993 Kushiro earthquake
- 1993 Okushiri earthquake
