= July 2008 Iwate earthquake =

Earthquake in Japan

- 岩手県沿岸北部地震
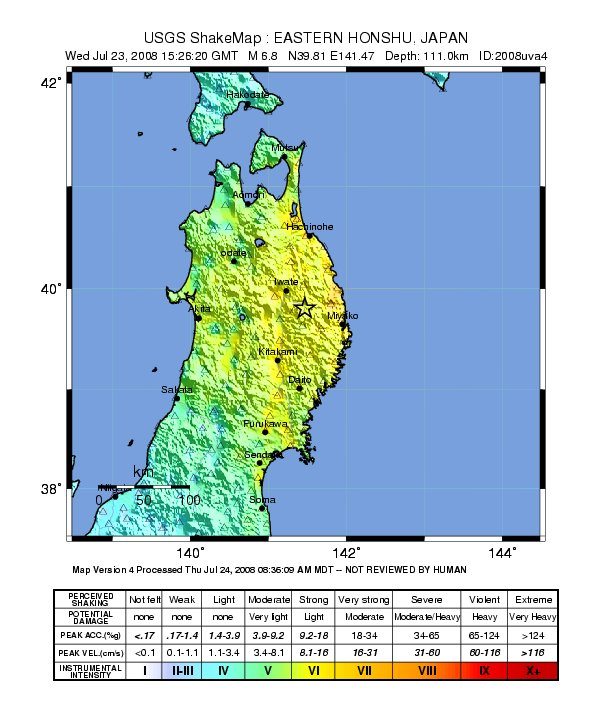

- Location within Japan
- UTC time: 2008-07-23 15:26:19
- ISC event: 13389912
- USGS-ANSS: ComCat
- Local date: July 24, 2008
- Local time: 00:26 (JST)
- Magnitude: 6.8 M_{JMA} 6.8 M_{w}
- Depth: 115 km (71 mi)
- Epicenter: 39.802°N 141.464°E
- Max. intensity: MMI VII (Very strong) JMA 6−
- Casualties: 1 dead, 211 injured

The July 2008 Iwate earthquake (岩手県沿岸北部地震, Iwate-ken Engan Hokubu Jishin) was an earthquake that occurred in Iwate Prefecture, Japan on July 23, 2008. The earthquake's moment magnitude was 6.8 and it occurred at a depth of 115 km. Since this earthquake was an intermediate-focus earthquake, the shaking of the earthquake was observed over a wide range. It had a maximum JMA intensity of Shindo 6− (Aomori and Iwate), initially recorded as 6+ in Hirono, Iwate by a meter later concluded to be improperly installed.

== Earthquake ==
The earthquake ruptured a fault within the subducting Pacific Plate beneath northern Iwate at a calculated depth of 115 km (71 mi). Earthquakes within the subducting slabs are intraslab events; other intraslab earthquakes including those occurring in 1987, 1993, 2001 and 2003 have been damaging. Although occurring deeper in Earth's interior, these events can produce large ground motions. In the case of this earthquake, the recorded peak ground acceleration exceeded 1,000 cm/sec^{2}, corresponding to IX (Violent) on the Mercalli intensity scale. A seismic inversion study suggest the earthquake ruptured two fault segments; the northern segment measuring 14 km (8.7 mi) × 30 km (19 mi), and the southern segment measuring 16 km (9.9 mi) × 30 km (19 mi). A maximum slip of 2.4 m (7 ft 10 in) was estimated.

== Casualties ==
An elderly woman in Iwaki who suffered severe wounds and later succumbed after falling from her bed due to the shaking. At least 211 others were also injured.

== See also ==
- List of earthquakes in 2008
- List of earthquakes in Japan
- 2008 Iwate-Miyagi Nairiku earthquake - similarly sized but unrelated earthquake that affected an area to the south the month prior.
