= 2008 Iwate earthquake =

2008 Iwate earthquake may refer to:

- 2008 Iwate–Miyagi Nairiku earthquake on 14 June 2008, M_{w} 6.9
- July 2008 Iwate earthquake on 24 July 2008, M_{w} 6.8
