= NIED =

NIED may refer to:

- Negligent infliction of emotional distress, a legal concept in the United States
- National Research Institute for Earth Science and Disaster Resilience, a government agency in Japan
