= 1993 Kushiro earthquake =

Earthquake in Japan

Kushiro–Oki earthquake (釧路沖地震)
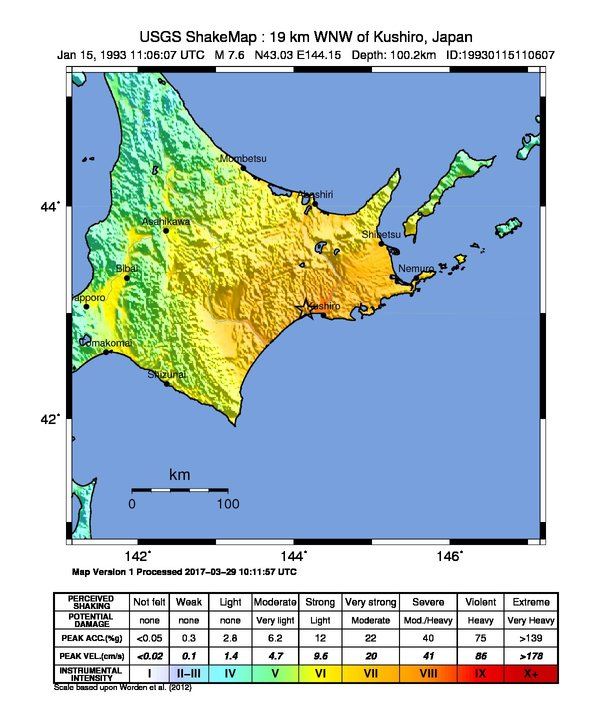

- Location within Hokkaido
- UTC time: 1993-01-15 11:06:05
- ISC event: 252904
- USGS-ANSS: ComCat
- Local date: 15 January 1993
- Local time: 20:06 JST
- Magnitude: 7.6 M_{w} 7.8 M_{JMA}
- Depth: 100 km (62 mi)
- Epicenter: 42.98°N 144.34°E
- Type: Intraplate
- Total damage: ¥94.1 billion
- Max. intensity: JMA 6 MMI IX (Violent)
- Peak acceleration: 1.06 g 1040.6 Gal
- Tsunami: None
- Landslides: Yes
- Aftershocks: Yes
- Casualties: 2 dead 966 injured

The 1993 Kushiro–Oki earthquake (釧路沖地震, Kushiro-Oki Jishin) was one of two large earthquake to strike the Japanese island of Hōkkaido within the same year. The earthquake with a magnitude of 7.6 M_{w} or 7.8 M_{JMA} struck at 11:06 UTC or 08:06 pm JST on January 15 near the town of Ashoro. Shaking reached a maximum intensity of IX (Violent) on the Mercalli intensity scale, causing considerable damage, and was felt throughout the island, into northern Honshu, Sakhalin, and the Kuril Islands. As a result of the tremors, two people were killed and more than 600 were wounded.

This earthquake was followed up by another 7.7 M_{w}earthquake six months later, occurring in the Sea of Japan which triggered a deadly tsunami. Over 200 deaths were recorded, with many missing. Although that earthquake killed more people, it was felt over a smaller area compared to the event in January, possibly because it had a deeper depth of focus.

== Tectonic setting ==
Hokkaidō sits near a convergent plate boundary where the Pacific plate is subducting beneath the Okhotsk microplate at a rate of 8.5–9.0 cm/yr along the Kuril and Japan trenches. The associated plate boundary megathrust would rupture in moderate to very large megathrust earthquakes such as those seen in 1952, 1963, 2003 and 2011. However, earthquakes also occur within the downgoing Pacific plate, beneath Japan, along faults that release strain within it. These intraslab earthquakes can have a focal depth of up to 100 km or deeper. Despite having greater focal depths, these events can produce strong ground motions at the surface. Earthquakes within the subducting plates are known as intraslab events; other intraslab earthquakes including those occurring in 1987, 2001, 2003 and 2008 have been damaging.

== Earthquake ==
The magnitude 7.6 Kushiro–Oki earthquake was an intermediate-depth intraslab event occurring at a depth of 100 km (62 mi) beneath Hokkaidō. It occurred in a region where there was a lack of prior seismicity. Based on studying the aftershocks distribution, it was determined that the earthquake ruptured a near-horizontal fault. Slip along the fault was restricted to a 40 km (25 mi) by 20 km (12 mi) area, and was located within the underthrusted slab. The fault ruptured at a velocity of 3.3 km/s (2.1 mi/s) or 3.6 km/s (2.2 mi/s), producing an average slip of 5.5 m (18 ft), with a localized maximum slip estimated at 11 m (36 ft). In October 1994, a larger intraslab earthquake would strike the region. That earthquake occurred along a near-vertical fault. A study suggested that this earthquake was triggered by the deep-focus earthquake of May 12, 1990, which occurred 594 km (369 mi) beneath the southern part of Sakhalin, caused by extension along the deeper part of the downgoing Pacific plate.

== Effects ==
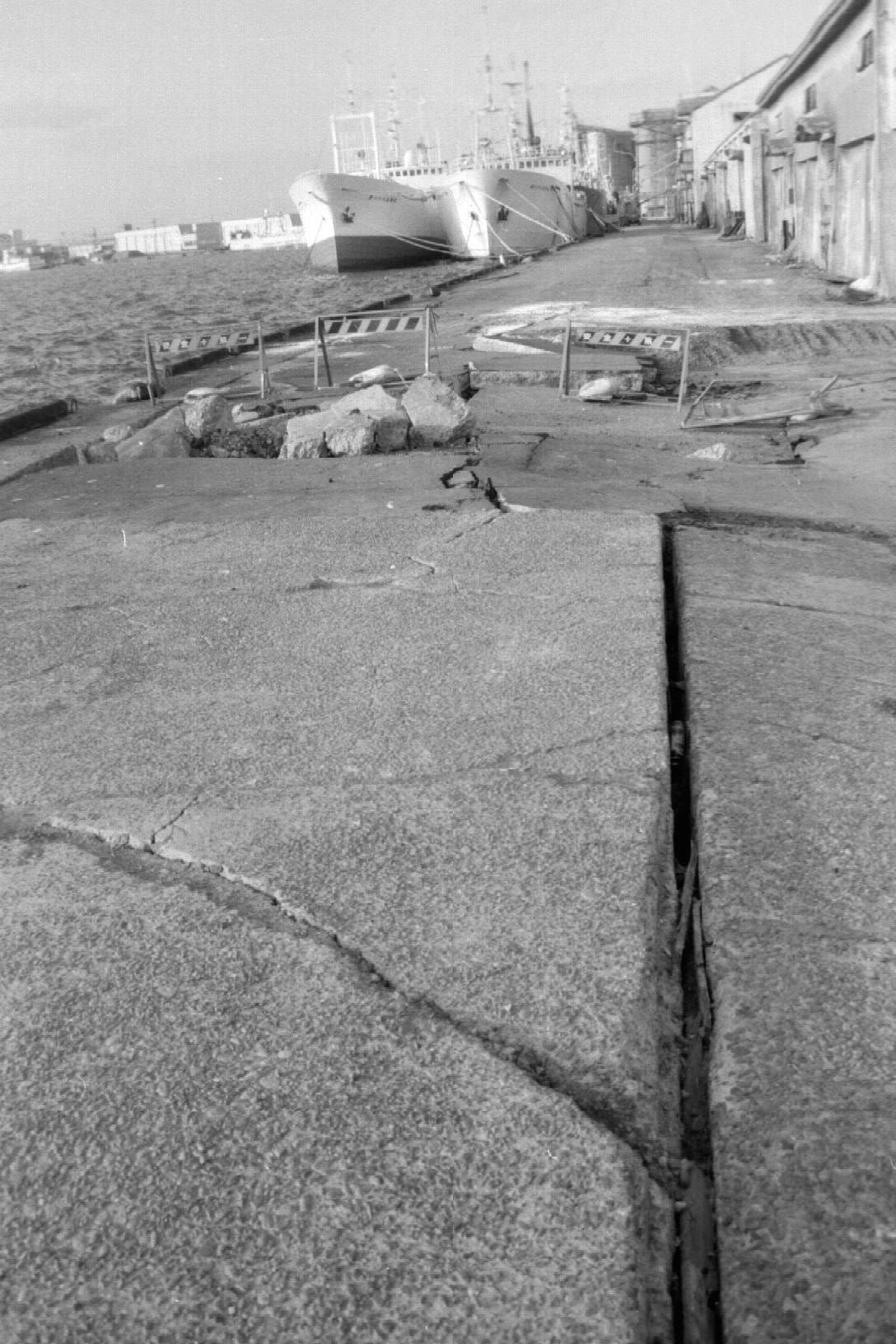
Damage to a pier in Kushiro.

A peak ground acceleration of up to 922 cm/s² was recorded at Kushiro that lasted 30 seconds which caused extensive soil liquefaction and damage to the city. In the city, six homes collapsed while 590 were affected, 33 of them sustaining serious damage. Further destruction of properties resulted from landslides and slope failures, some posing additional threats even after the earthquake. During one of the many landslides, a house slid ten meters down the slopes of a hill. The port area was also destroyed by liquefaction, buried manholes and sewage pipes were uplifted and erupted from the ground by up to 1.5 meters. Uplift was observed along a 200-meter zone. Two people were killed; one died from a falling ceiling light, the other was poisoned by gas. Sixty-one individuals were badly injured while another 661 had received minor injuries.

Farm roads, irrigation and drainage canals, and pipelines were severely damaged by ground failures induced by shaking. More roads across 18 locations had to be closed due to the failure of embankments. Slope failures were common around Kushiro, which brought down with it local homes.

Gas pipelines were damaged, affecting more than 9,300 residents when supply ceased. It was only restored 23 days later. Water was also inaccessible to 4,000 people for five days. Throughout the island, over 57,000 were left without power after the quake but was quickly restored by the next day.

Since the earthquake occurred during the winter, a thorough inspection of dams could not be conducted as snowfall had completely covered the structures. It was only in the spring did engineers began their investigation. The Mombetsu Dam was found with some damage; the concrete slope protection on the upstream side of that dam had been raised slightly, but they weren't found to affect the state of the dam. Deformation on the ground slope of the left bank was also discovered when the reservoir was drained.

Retrofitting works done would spare the city from damage once again when the Kuril Islands was struck with a much bigger earthquake in October 1994.

== See also ==
- List of earthquakes in 1993
- List of earthquakes in Japan
