= E-Defense =

Earthquake shake table in Japan

- E-ディフェンス
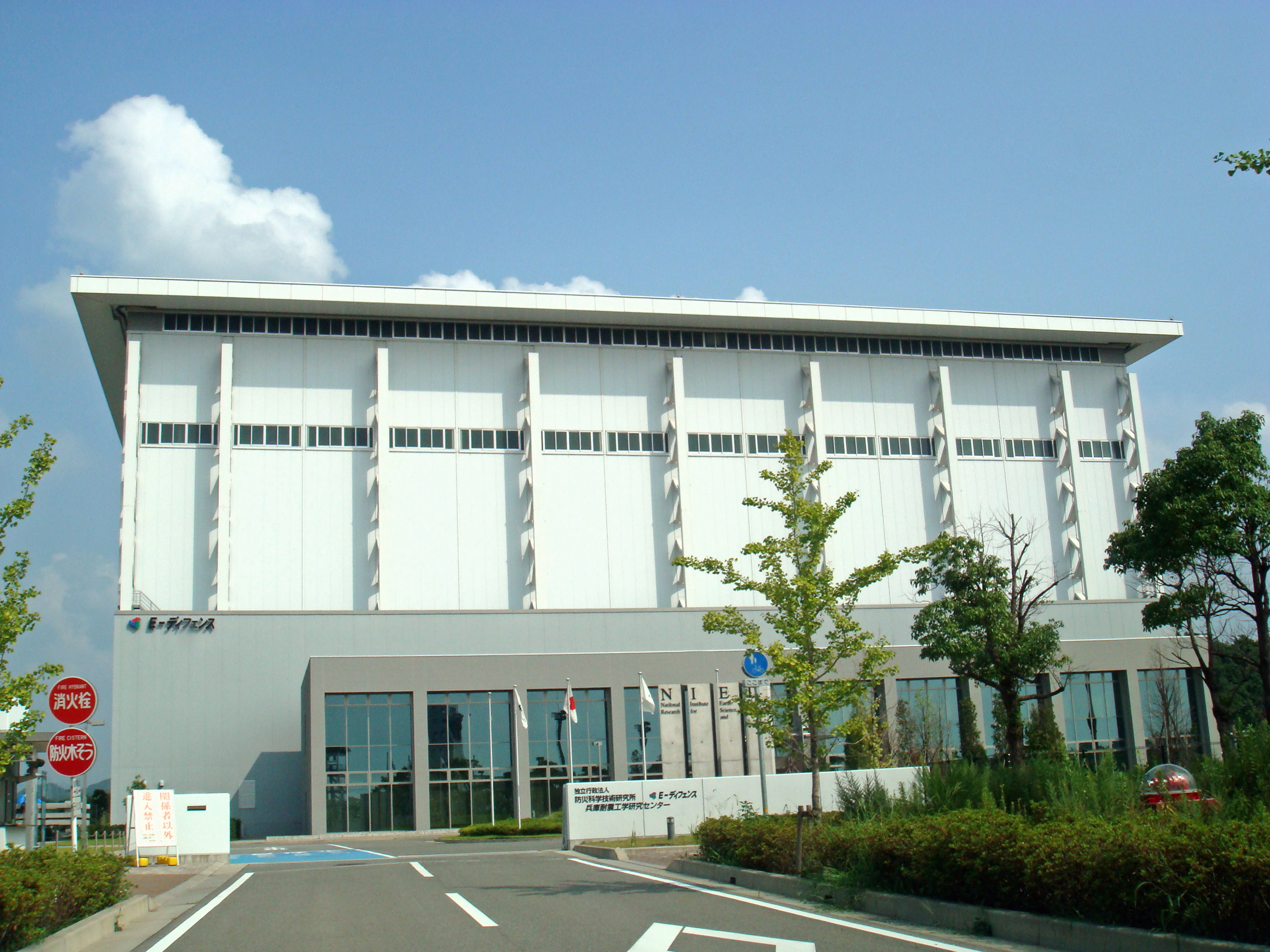
- Interactive map of the E-Defense area

General information
- Location: Miki, Hyōgo, Japan
- Coordinates: 34°46′42″N 135°03′20″E

The 3-D Full-Scale Earthquake Testing Facility or E-Defense (Japanese: E-ディフェンス) is an earthquake shaking table facility in Miki, Hyōgo Prefecture, Japan. Operated by the Japanese National Research Institute for Earth Science and Disaster Resilience (NIED), it was the largest 3D earthquake shake table in the world when it was commissioned.

== History ==
After the destructive Great Hanshin earthquake of 1995, the Science and Technology Agency established a round-table conference, which in May 1996 recommended that an earthquake research centre be founded to prevent future earthquake damage in urban areas. It was recommended that the research centre should have a three-dimensional shake table.

Development of the table's actuators began in 1995, and the design and construction of E-Defense began in 1998 or 1999 (sources vary), intending to replicate the ground motions of the Great Hanshin earthquake. Mitsubishi Heavy Industries machinery systems designed and constructed the facility, which is located at Miki Earthquake Disaster Memorial Park. Construction of the table's foundation started in 1999 and was completed in 2001. Operations began in 2005 after a total construction cost of 45 billion yen. The nickname "E-Defense" was selected in a public competition, with the letter "E" standing for Earth.

E-Defense could not reproduce the ground motions of the 2011 Tōhoku earthquake due to the long period and long duration of the shaking. NIED tried to simulate the ground motions of this earthquake for five minutes but was initially only able to manage 1.5 minutes of shaking due to insufficient oil for the actuators. After more accumulators were installed and bypass valves were added to the actuators, they achieved the goal of five minutes of sustained shaking.

== Facility ==
The table is 20 by 15 metres (an area of 300 square metres), making it the largest earthquake shaking table in the world when it was constructed. It can move in the x, y, and z directions and perform yaw, pitch, and roll rotations. It can accelerate up to 1 g horizontally in both directions and up to 1.5 g vertically. It can have a maximum payload of 1,200 tons. The table has five horizontal actuators for both directions and 14 vertical actuators, each with a maximum driving force of 4,500 kilonewtons. They can generate frequencies with good accuracy up to 15 hertz and can be increased to 30 hertz with lower accuracy. Universal joints are placed between the actuators and the table.

The facility is on a six-hectare site, which includes several buildings. These are the experiment building, which contains the shaking table; the operation building, which contains the control system for the shaking table; the hydraulic unit building, which contains equipment that powers the shaking table; and the preparation building, where test structures are prepared.

== Experiments ==
As of 2020, 113 experiments have been run on the table, at an average of 7.1 experiments per year. Experiments are either projects run by the NIED, projects run jointly by the NIED and other organisations, or run by other organisations. Most of the design and construction time for experiments takes place outside the main E-Defense facility to maximise the use of the table. Experimental structures are placed onto the table using two cranes with a combined maximum loading capacity of 9000 kilonewtons.

Due to the high cost of running the experiments, it is E-Defense policy that the results not be intellectual property of the conductors of the experiments but instead shared by the international earthquake engineering community. This is so that the results can have a high impact.
