= Mount Kurikoma =

Stratovolcano in Japan

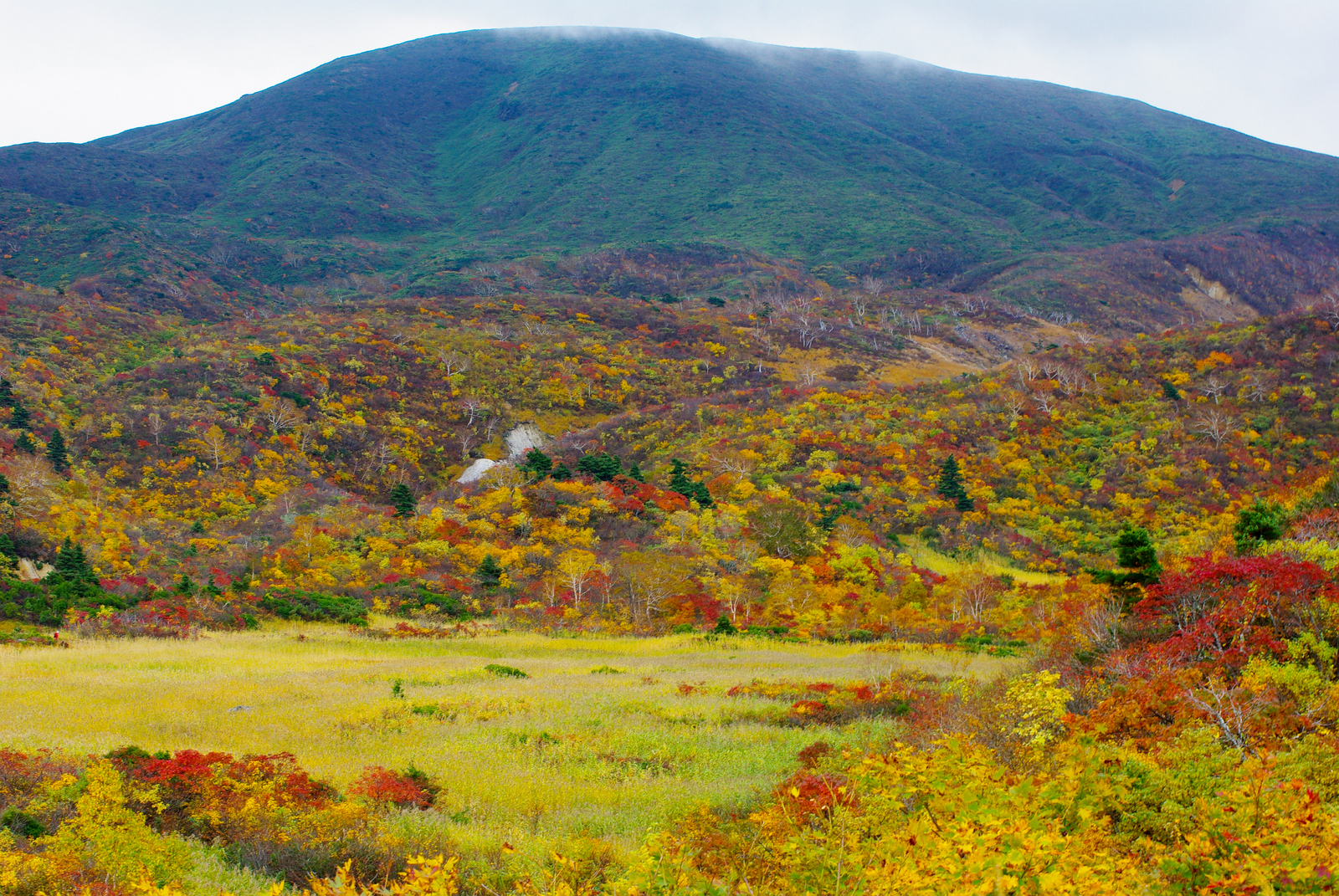
- Viewed from the north-northwest at Najigahara

Highest point
- Elevation: 5,338 ft (1,627 m)
- Listing: Volcanoes in Japan
- Coordinates: 38°57′40″N 140°47′17″E

Geography
- Location within Japan
- Location: Iwate Prefecture
- Parent range: Ōu Mountains

Geology
- Mountain type: Stratovolcano with somma
- Volcanic arc: Northeastern Japan Arc
- Last eruption: 1944

Mount Kurikoma, also known as Kurikomayama and Sukawadake, is an active stratovolcano in Japan that stands 1,627 m (5,338 ft) tall. The volcano is located in Iwate Prefecture on Honshu, the largest of the four main islands of Japan. In addition to recent eruptions, the volcano is seismically active. It is the main feature of Kurikoma Quasi-National Park and a tourist attraction due to its hot springs, hiking trails and flora.

== Geology ==
Mount Kurikoma composition is mostly andesitic to dacitic which formed atop elevated Tertiary dacitic tuffs and sedimentary rocks; hence the volcano's volume is smaller than its height suggests. In the early construction phase, lava erupted 500 thousand years ago to the north and south. It was followed by the formation of Higashi-Kurikoma. The volcanic cone Magusadake was last active 100 thousand years ago. The summit features a caldera 4 km (2.5 mi) across which is breached to the north and occupied by the Tsurugi-dake cone. The volcano's base consists of Tertiary to Quaternary pyroclasts including sedimentary and welded tuffs. A major active reverse fault runs east to southeast of the summit.

=== Volcanic activity ===
Since 915 AD, at least two eruptions have occurred; one in 1944. Between 5,400 years and 915 years ago, two more phreatic eruptions occurred. Dead trees in Showa Lake within the volcanic complex suggest the production of volcanic gases. The 1944 eruption occurred at the present location of Showa Lake. It killed many fishes when water in the Iwaki River became discolored. Seismic activity around the volcano is frequent; the most significant was the M_{JMA} 7.2 earthquake that struck on 14 June 2008. The 45 km (28 mi) long aftershock zone encompassed the volcano. The earthquake triggered many large landslides around the volcano's flanks, some which were destructive and deadly.

== Gallery ==
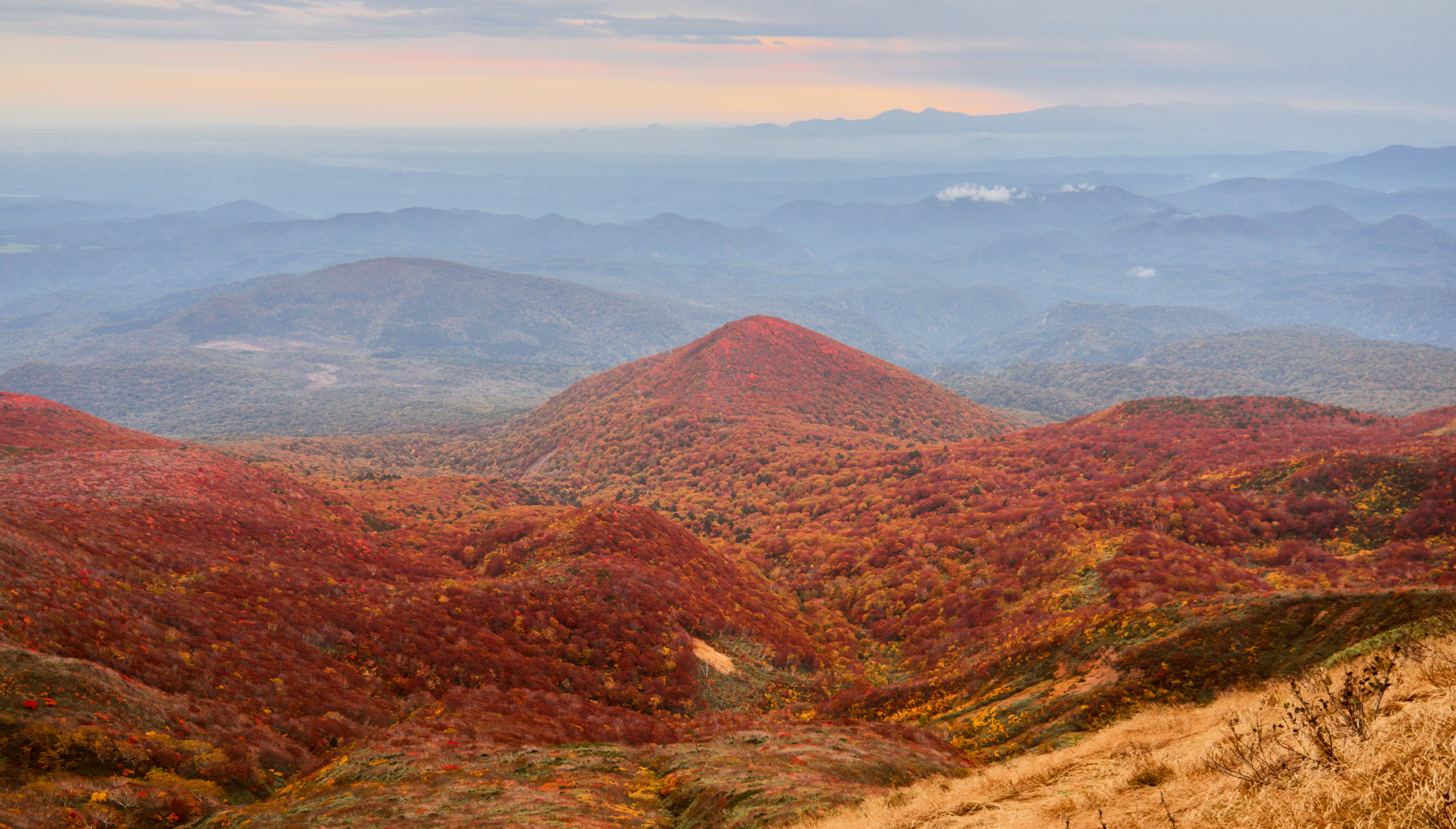
Autumn foliage, from the peak of Mt. Kurikoma.

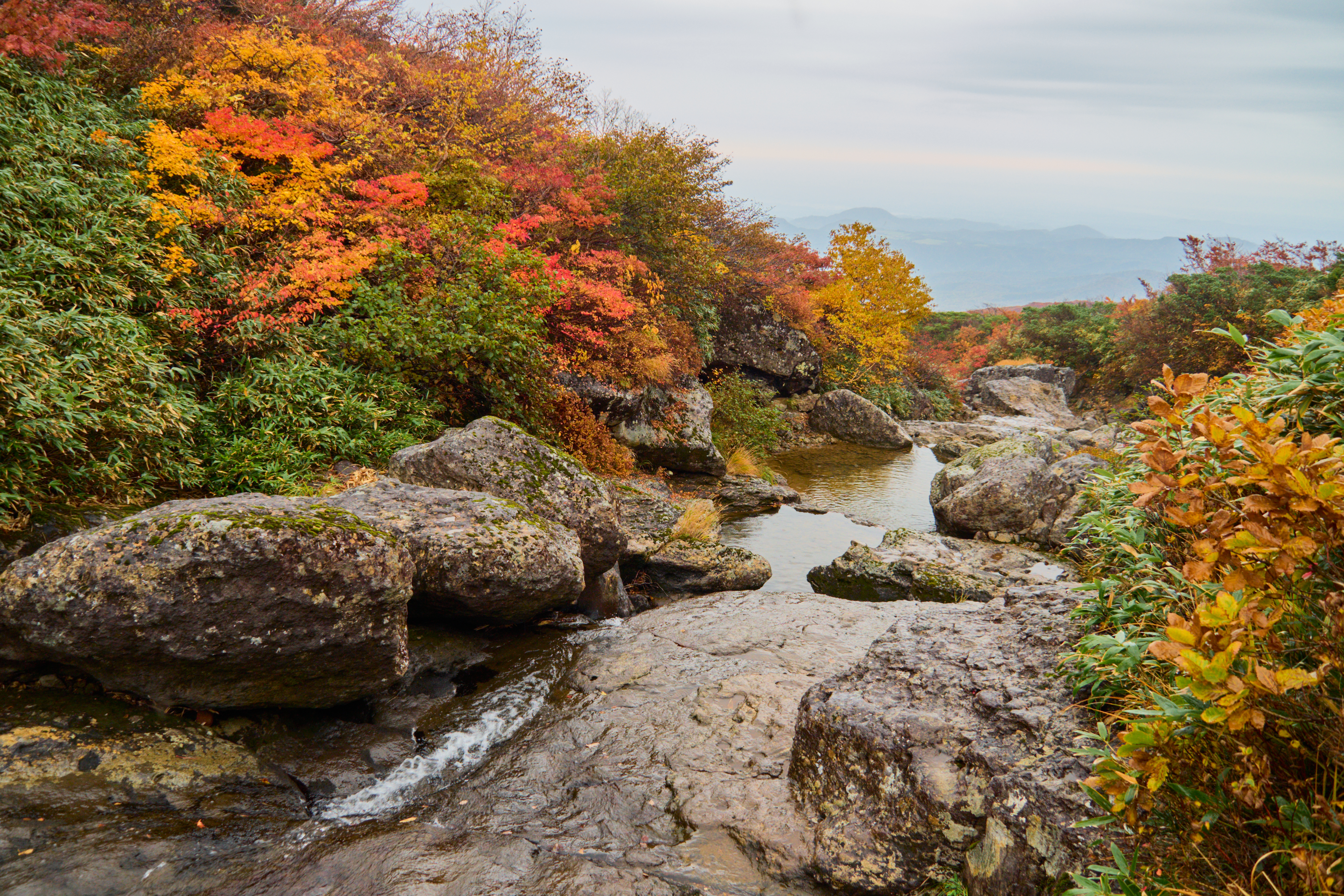
A rocky mountain stream flowing through autumn foliage on Mount Kurikoma.

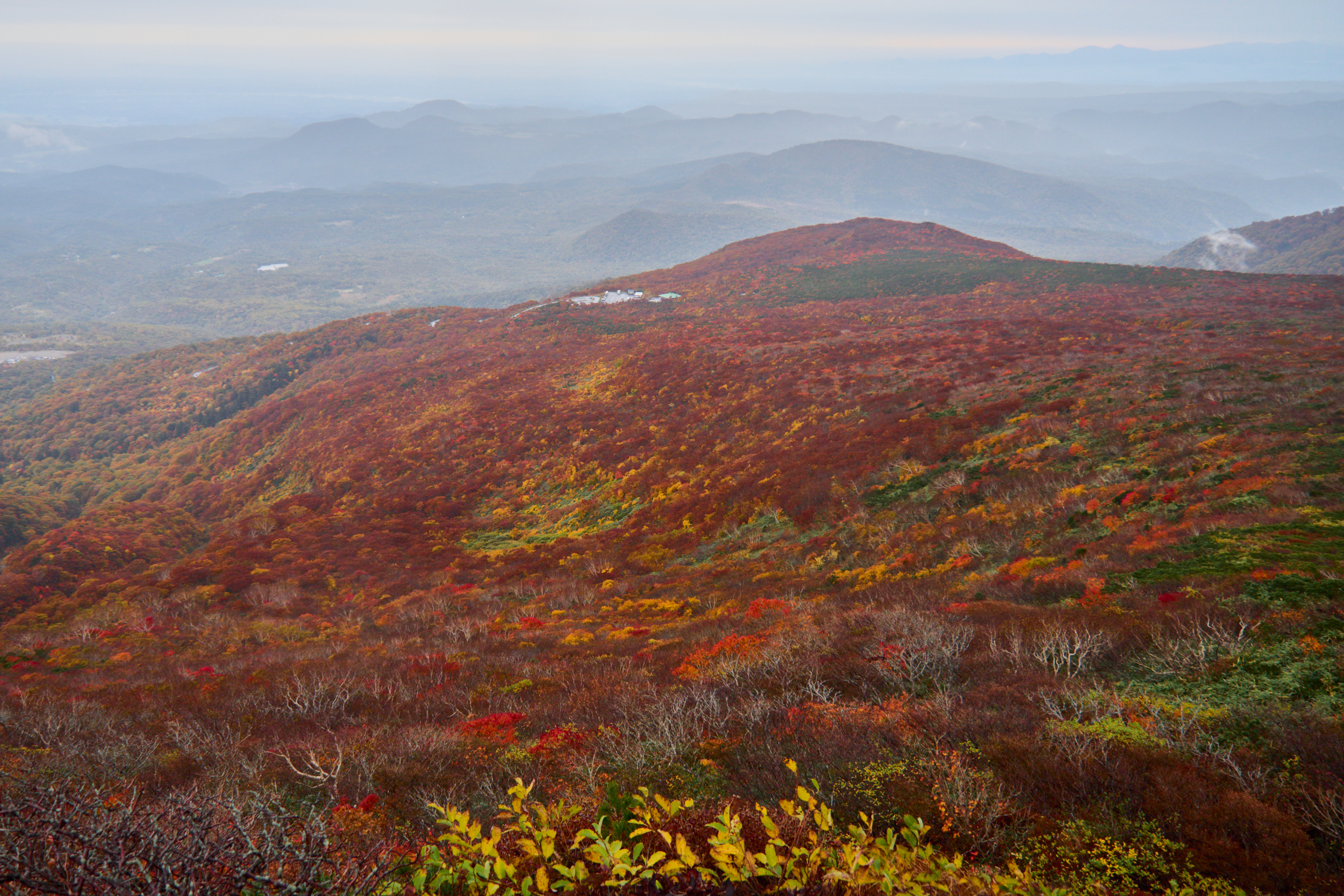
Autumn foliage covering the slopes and ridgeline of Mount Kurikoma.

== See also ==
- List of volcanoes in Japan
- List of mountains in Japan
