= 1982 Urakawa earthquake =

Earthquake in Japan

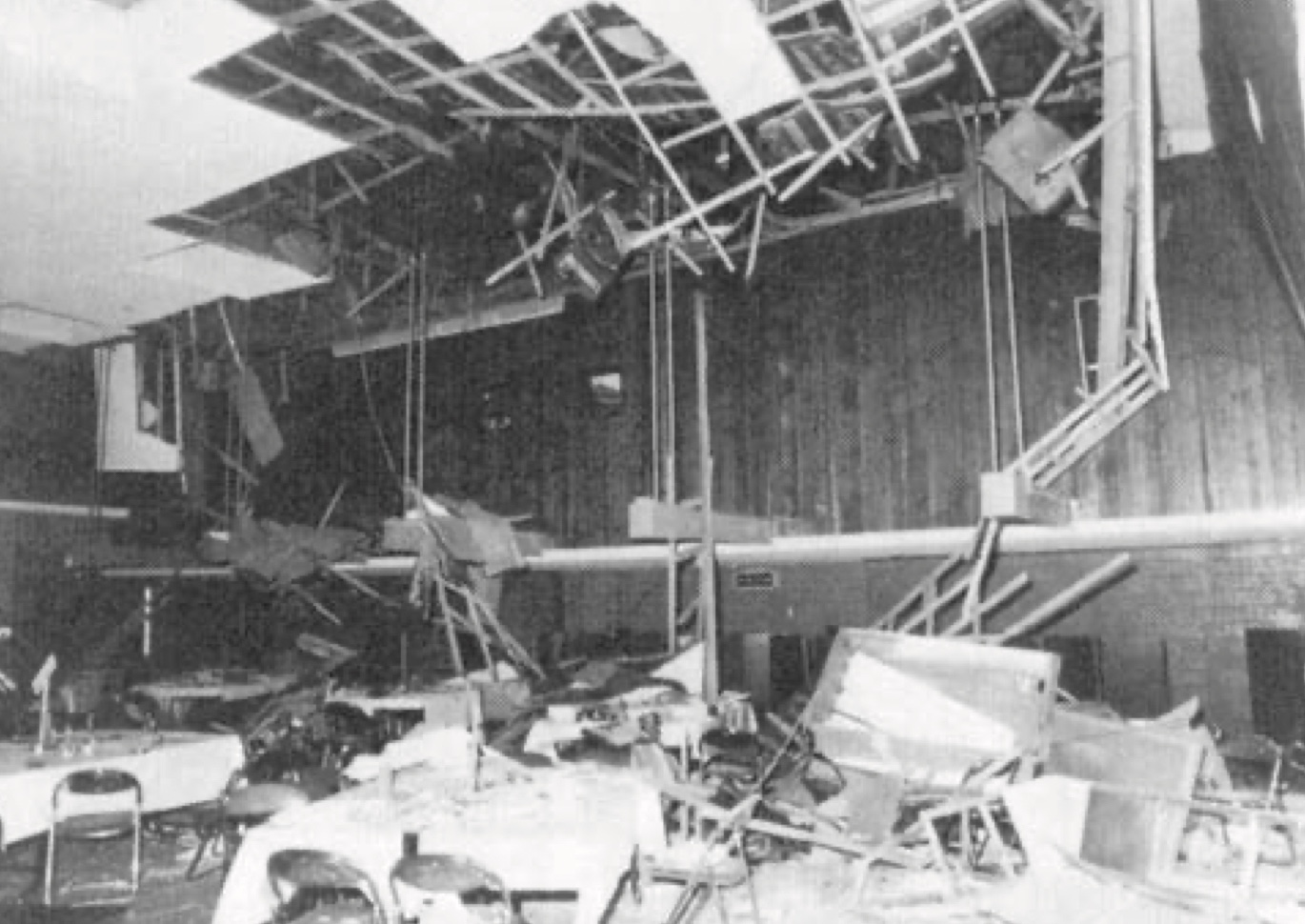

- Location within Hokkaido Location within Japan
- UTC time: 1982-03-21 02:32:07
- ISC event: 602579
- USGS-ANSS: ComCat
- Local date: March 21, 1982
- Local time: 11:32
- Magnitude: 6.7–6.8 M_{s} 6.9 M_{w} 7.1 M_{JMA}
- Depth: 44.0 km (27.3 mi)
- Epicenter: 42.158°N 142.361°E
- Areas affected: Japan
- Total damage: US$1 million
- Max. intensity: JMA 6+ MMI X (Extreme)
- Tsunami: 1.3 m (4.3 ft)
- Foreshocks: Yes
- Aftershocks: Yes, largest M_{w} 5.9
- Casualties: 167 injured

The 1982 Urakawa earthquake (Japanese: 浦河沖地震) was a M_{w} 6.9 earthquake that struck off the coast of Urakawa, Japan, on 11:32 (JST), March 21, 1982. The epicenter was 42.1°N 142.6°E. The earthquake was the largest earthquake in the history of the region. The earthquake caused 167 injuries and damage in Tomakomai and Sapporo.

== Tectonic setting ==
Hokkaido is situated on the Okhotsk Plate in between two main zones of seismicity. To the west, there is a convergent plate boundary with the Amurian Plate. To the east, there exists a subduction zone where the Pacific Plate subducts underneath the Okhotsk. This is accommodated by slip along the Kuril-Kamchatka Trench and the Japan Trench. This earthquake struck as the result of thrust faulting in an area of compression known as the Hidaka Collision Zone. The same tectonic process, caused by the collision between the Eurasian Plate and the Kuril fore-arc uplifts the Hidaka Mountains.

== Earthquake ==
At 2:32 UTC or 11:32 local time on 21 March, a large earthquake struck off the shore of southern Hokkaido. The M_{w} 6.9 earthquake caused shaking that reached a maximum Japan Meteorological Agency seismic intensity scale Shindo of 6- and a Modified Mercalli intensity (MMI) of X (Extreme). The event struck at a depth of 44.0 km (27.3 mi), and ruptured along the Hidaka Collision Zone. Inferred rupture dimensions were 12 km (7.5 mi) by 22 km (14 mi) with an average slip of 2.5 m (8 ft 2 in). Aftershocks covered an area of 35 km (22 mi) by 25 km (16 mi).

== Tsunami ==
Teletsunami observations
Location	Recorded height (m)
Urakawa, Japan	1.3
Ayukawa, Japan	0.6
Hachinohe, Japan	0.6
Shoya, Japan	0.3
Kuji, Japan	0.3
Kamaishi, Japan	0.2
Kushiro, Japan	0.2

Tsunami from the earthquake was observed around Hokkaido, with varying run-up heights. Urakawa had the highest run-ups with waves reaching up to 1.3 m (4 ft 3 in) high and going up to 3 m (9.8 ft) inland. The observations at Hachinohe and Hiroo were much higher than models predicted, however this may be due to the models not taking into account more local topography that could influence wave heights.
