= 2021 Chiba earthquake =

2021 earthquake in Japan

- 千葉県北西部地震
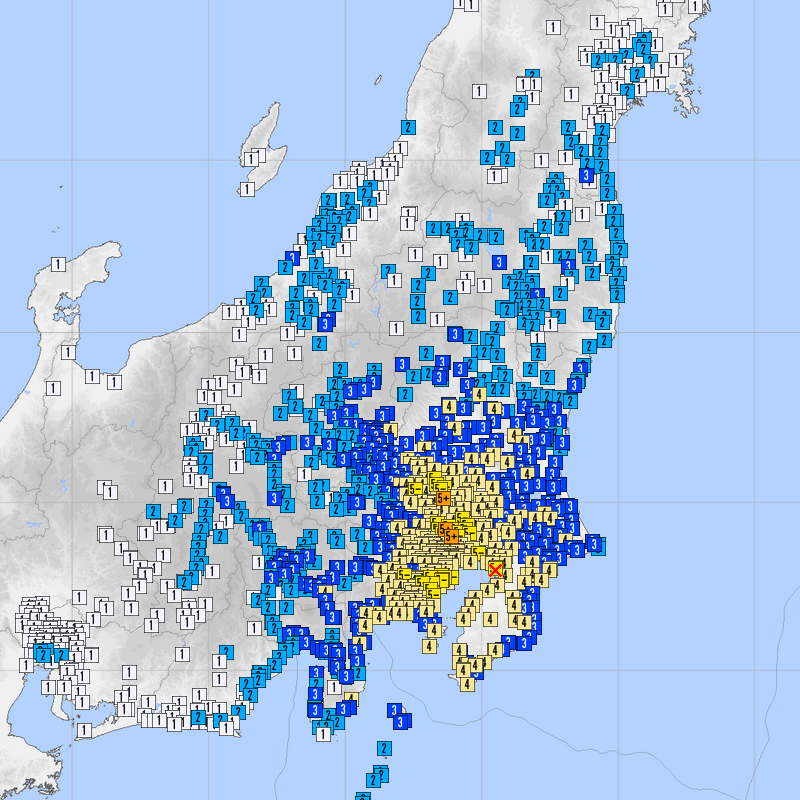

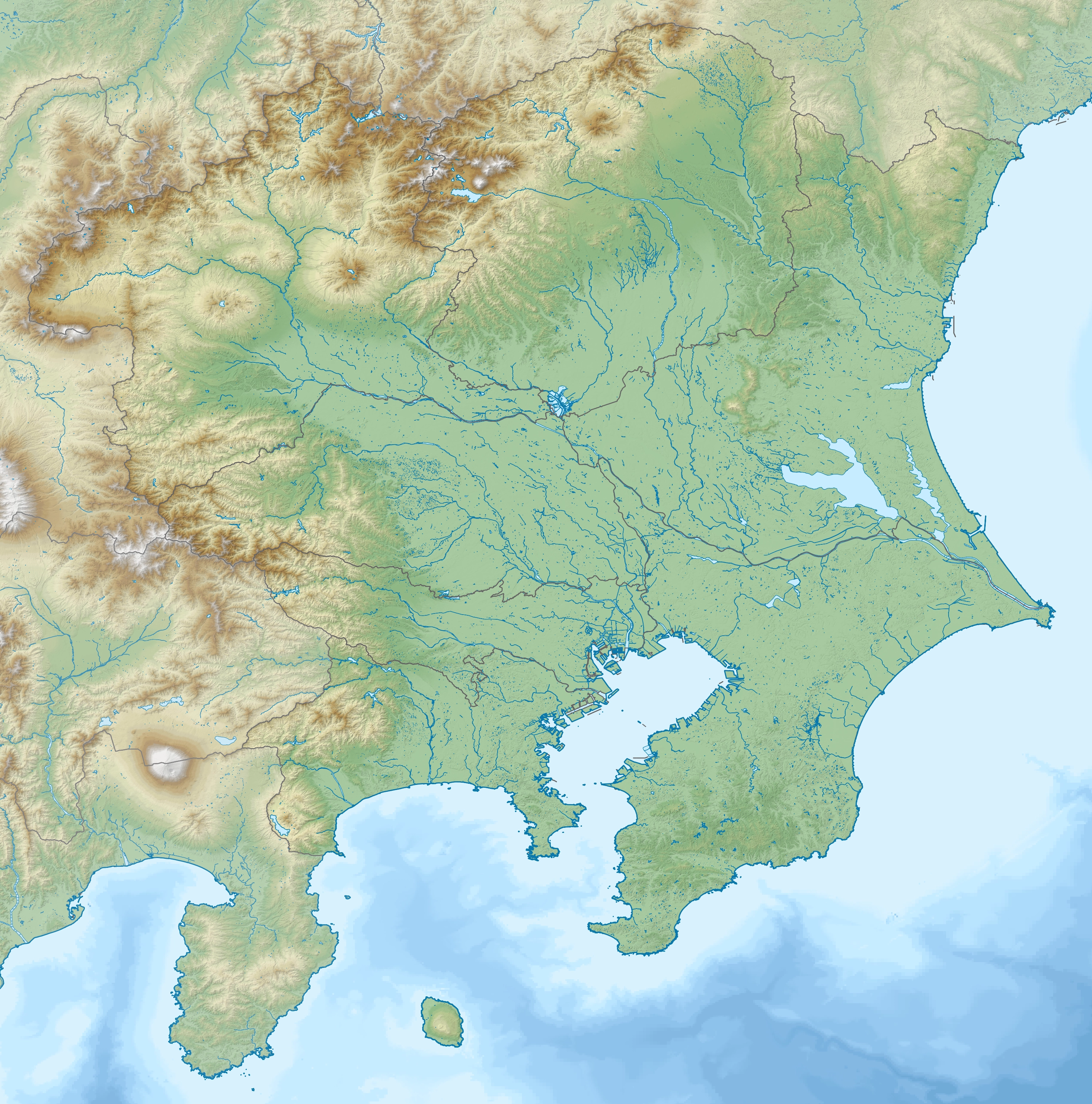
- Location within Kanto Area Location within Japan
- UTC time: 2021-10-07 13:41:24
- USGS-ANSS: ComCat
- Local date: 7 October 2021
- Local time: 22:41
- Magnitude: 5.9 M_{w}
- Depth: 62.0 km (38.5 mi) (USGS); 75.0 km (46.6 mi) (JMA)
- Epicenter: 35.577°N 140.070°E
- Areas affected: Japan
- Total damage: Limited
- Max. intensity: MMI VI (Strong); JMA 5+
- Casualties: 51 injured

The 2021 Chiba earthquake (千葉県北西部地震, Chiba-ken Hokuseibu Jishin) was an earthquake that occurred in Japan at 22:41 JST (13:41 UTC) on October 7, 2021. The epicenter was recorded approximately 4 kilometers (2.5 mi) southwest of Chiba in Chiba Prefecture. The earthquake struck a depth of around 62.0 kilometers (38.5 mi) to 75.0 kilometers (46.6 mi) with a magnitude of 5.9 on the Richter scale. A maximum intensity of Shindo 5+ was recorded, equivalent to VI (Strong) on the Mercalli scale. It was the strongest earthquake to strike the Tokyo area since the 2011 Tohoku earthquake.

== Earthquake ==
=== Intensity ===
A maximum intensity of Shindo 5+ was recorded in the prefectures of Tokyo and Saitama.

Intensity	Prefecture	Location
5+	Saitama	Kawaguchi, Miyashiro
5+	Tokyo	Adachi
5−	Saitama	Midori, Sōka, Warabi, Yashio, Misato, Satte, Yoshikawa, Kazo, Konosu, Kuki
5−	Chiba	Chūō, Funabashi, Matsudo, Nagareyama
5−	Tokyo	Ōta, Machida
5−	Kanagawa	Tsurumi, Kanagawa, Naka, Kohoku, Midori, Kawasaki

== Impact ==
=== Injuries ===
At least 51 people were injured, four of them seriously.

=== Damage ===
Minor damage and power outages were reported in the epicentral area.

Due to the earthquake, transportation such as railroads ceased operations temporarily. Additionally, a Nippori-Toneri Liner train derailed in Adachi, Tokyo.

There were also reported instances of fires; an oil refinery processing unit was suspended after a fire broke out there.

== See also ==
- List of earthquakes in 2021
- List of earthquakes in Japan
- 2012 Chiba earthquake
