= 1987 Chiba earthquake =

Earthquake near Tokyo, Japan

- 千葉県東方沖地震
- Location within Chiba Prefecture Location within Japan
- UTC time: 1987-12-17 02:08:19
- ISC event: 450774
- USGS-ANSS: ComCat
- Local date: December 17, 1987
- Local time: 11:08
- Magnitude: 7.3 M_{e} 6.7 M_{w}
- Depth: 62.9 km (39.1 mi)
- Epicenter: 35.372°N 140.519°E
- Type: Strike-slip
- Max. intensity: JMA 5− MMI VII (Very strong)
- Casualties: 2 dead, 144 injured

The 1987 Chiba Prefecture offshore earthquake (Japanese: 千葉県東方沖地震) occurred off the east coast of the Boso Peninsula in Chiba Prefecture at 11:08:01 JST on December 17, 1987.

== Tectonic setting ==
The crustal structure in the southern Kantō region is complex, involving boundaries between three tectonic plates. The Philippine Sea plate is subducting beneath the Okhotsk plate along the line of the Sagami Trough and beneath the Eurasian plate along the line of the Nankai Trough. Further to the east, the Pacific plate is subducting beneath the Okhotsk and Philippine Sea plates along the line of the Japan Trench. A velocity analysis of the region beneath Kanto suggests that the wedge of oceanic mantle lithosphere of the Philippine Sea plate in contact with the Pacific plate is affected by serpentinization as shown by the anomalously low seismic velocity. The boundary between the serpentinized and unmetamorphosed parts of the mantle wedge is interpreted to be vertical and NNW–SSE trending.

== Earthquake ==
The earthquake had a strike-slip focal mechanism, which with its depth, indicates that it was a result of faulting within the Philippine Sea plate. The focal mechanism gives two possible fault planes, one west–east trending, dipping steeply to the south, and the other north–south trending, dipping steeply to the east. The distribution of aftershocks suggests a NNW–SSE trending rupture, consistent with the nearly north–south fault plane, indicating dextral (right-lateral) strike-slip faulting with a small component of reverse faulting. The earthquake is interpreted to have ruptured part of the boundary between the two parts of the Philippine Sea plate mantle wedge.

== Damage ==
According to the materials of the Fire and Disaster Prevention Division of the Chiba Prefecture General Affairs Department, two deaths (one in Mobara and another in Ichihara), 26 serious injuries and 118 minor injuries were reported. 16 buildings collapsed, 102 were severely damaged, and 63,692 suffered minor damage. Three fires, power outages, and train service disruptions were also reported. Liquefaction was observed on landfills and riverbanks. Even though most of the damage occurred in Chiba Prefecture, damage and landslides were also reported in Kanagawa Prefecture.

== See also ==
- List of earthquakes in 1987
- List of earthquakes in Japan
- 2012 Chiba earthquake
- 2021 Chiba earthquake
