= 2001 Geiyo earthquake =

Earthquake in Japan

- 芸予地震
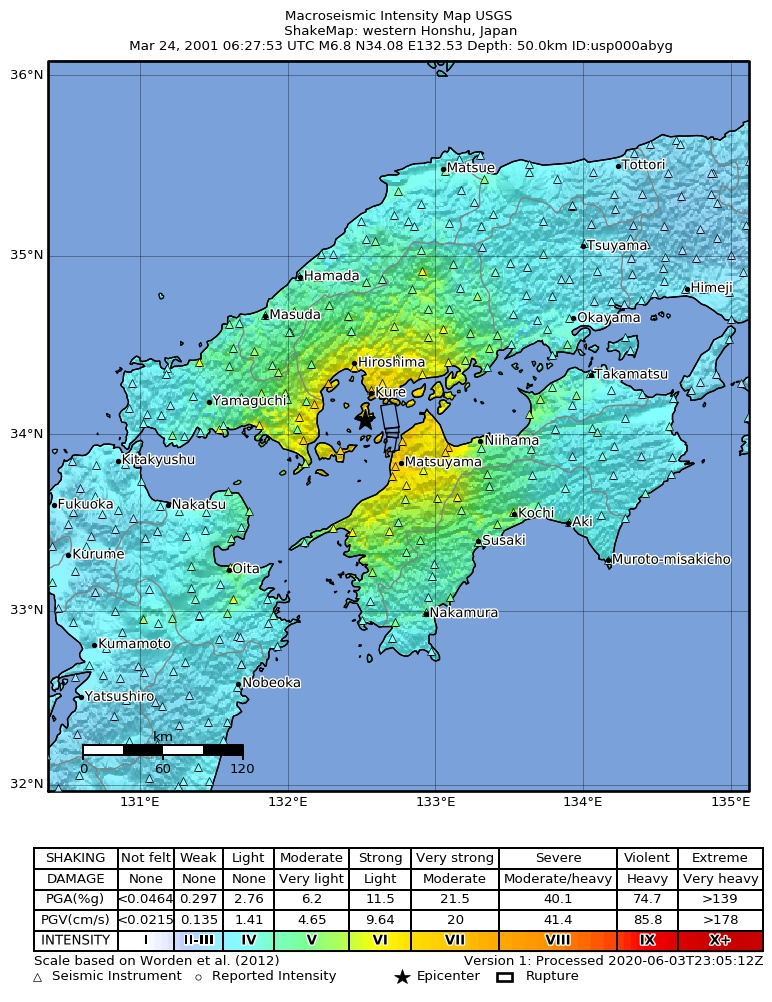
- USGS ShakeMap

- Location within Hiroshima Prefecture Location within Japan
- UTC time: 2001-03-24 06:27:53
- ISC event: 1800460
- USGS-ANSS: ComCat
- Local date: 24 March 2001
- Local time: 15:27:53 JST (UTC+9)
- Magnitude: M_{JMA} 6.7 M_{w} 6.8
- Depth: 50 km (31 mi)
- Epicenter: 34.083°N 132.526°E
- Type: Normal
- Areas affected: Chūgoku and Shikoku regions, Japan
- Total damage: ¥77.6 billion (US$500 million) ($886.1 million in 2024, adjusted for inflation)
- Max. intensity: JMA 6− (MMI IX)
- Peak acceleration: 0.85 g (832 gal)
- Casualties: 2 fatalities, 288 injuries

The 2001 Geiyo earthquake (2001年芸予地震 Nisen-ichi-nen Gēyo Jishin) occurred with a magnitude of M_{JMA} 6.7 on March 24 at 15:27:53 JST, and an epicenter located near the Geiyo Islands of Hiroshima, Japan.

== Tectonic setting ==
Near the Geiyo region, a M_{s} 7.8 earthquake occurred in June 1905, which was an intraslab event within the subducting Philippine Sea plate.

== Earthquake ==
The United States Geological Survey (USGS) gave the earthquake a magnitude of M_{w} 6.8, while the Japan Meteorological Agency (JMA) reported the magnitude at M_{JMA} 6.7, with its epicenter located near the island of Kurahashi-jima in Kure, Hiroshima Prefecture. The released seismic moment of the earthquake was 1.3×10^{19} Nm. This earthquake is a normal faulting intraslab event within the subducting Philippine Sea plate. The slip of the earthquake was estimated to be about 1.5–2.4 meters (4 ft 11 in – 7 ft 10 in). The locations of aftershocks were distributed roughly in N–S direction. It has been suggested that this earthquake was related to the dehydration of the Philippine Sea plate slab.

=== Intensity ===
Locations with a seismic intensity of Shindo 5− and higher
Intensity	Prefecture	Locations
6−	Hiroshima	Higashihiroshima, Ōsakikamijima, Kumano
5+	Hiroshima	Kure, Etajima, Hiroshima, Hatsukaichi, Mihara, Onomichi, Kitahiroshima
5+	Ehime	Kamijima, Imabari, Saijō, Kumakōgen, Matsuyama, Masaki, Seiyo, Uwajima, Tobe
5+	Yamaguchi	Suō-Ōshima, Yanai, Tabuse, Hirao, Waki, Iwakuni, Yamaguchi
5−	Hiroshima	Fukuyama, Sera, Miyoshi
5−	Ehime	Ikata, Yawatahama, Ōzu, Uchiko, Iyo, Tōon, Niihama
5−	Yamaguchi	Kaminoseki, Hikari, Kudamatsu, Shūnan
5−	Shimane	Gōtsu, Hamada, Ōnan
5−	Kōchi	Kōchi
5−	Ōita	Saiki

The JMA reported it recorded a maximum seismic intensity of Shindo 6- on its seismic intensity scale; the maximum intensity was reported in Higashihiroshima, Ōsakikamijima and Kumano, Hiroshima Prefecture. Shindo 5+ was recorded in parts of Ehime and Yamaguchi Prefectures, while Shindo 5- was observed in multiple areas of Shimane, Kōchi and Ōita Prefectures; Shindo 1-4 was also reported in Kyushu, Kansai and Chūbu regions, with shaking recorded as far away as Shizuoka, Noto, Ishikawa, Iizuna and Kōzushima, Tokyo. A maximum peak ground acceleration of 832 gal (0.85 g) was recorded at Saeki-ku, Hiroshima; strong ground motions from the earthquake were amplified and spread to areas far from the epicenter, due to the ground beneath the region comprising soft sediments. On the Modified Mercalli intensity scale, the earthquake registered a maximum intensity of IX (Violent). Tremors were also felt along the eastern and southern coasts of South Korea.

== Impact ==
Two people were killed; one in Kure, Hiroshima due to a wall collapse and the other in Matsuyama, Ehime after being hit by falling roof tiles. Additionally, 288 others were injured, 43 of them seriously, including 183 in Hiroshima, 75 in Ehime, 12 in Yamaguchi, 4 in Kochi, 3 in Shimane and 1 in Okayama. The earthquake destroyed 76 homes, severely damaged 865 and partially damaged 53,243 others, with all structural collapses occurring in Hiroshima, Ehime and Yamaguchi; landslides destroyed 39 homes, mostly in Hiroshima. Additionally, 40,739 waterways, 1,209 cultural and educational facilities, 787 roads, 149 harbors, 97 hospitals, 9 bridges, 8 public buildings and 71 other structures were also affected.

In Hiroshima, over 3,700 buildings were damaged, train lines were suspended, Hiroshima Airport was temporarily closed for inspection, telecommunications were disrupted and soil liquefaction was reported. Most of the damaged residential buildings in the city were built on steep slopes. Liquefaction also occurred at Tōyo, Ehime. Power outages occurred in the prefectures of Hiroshima, Ehime, Okayama, Yamaguchi, and Kōchi.

== See also ==
- List of earthquakes in 2001
- List of earthquakes in Japan
- 2000 Tottori earthquake
