= 2012 Chiba earthquake =

Earthquake in Japan

- 千葉県東方沖地震
- UTC time: 2012-03-14 12:05:04
- ISC event: 605114238
- USGS-ANSS: ComCat
- Local date: 14 March 2012
- Local time: 21:05 JST
- Magnitude: 6.1 M_{j}
- Depth: 10.0 km (6.2 mi)
- Epicenter: 35.75°N 140.93°E
- Type: Normal
- Areas affected: Japan
- Max. intensity: MMI VII (Very strong); JMA 5+
- Tsunami: No
- Landslides: No
- Casualties: 1 dead, 1 injured

The 2012 Chiba earthquake (千葉県東方沖地震, Chiba-ken Tōhō Oki Jishin; lit. 'Eastern Chiba Prefecture offshore earthquake') occurred along the northeastern coast of Chiba Prefecture, Japan at 21:05 JST (12:05 UTC) on Wednesday, 14 March 2012. Although its epicentre lay just offshore near Chōshi city, the shallow magnitude 6.1 M_{j} earthquake produced considerable shaking inland through much of the Bōsō Peninsula and lower Ibaraki Prefecture. It occurred as a result of normal faulting in a seismically quiet region, possibly in response to the magnitude 9.0 M_{w} 2011 Tōhoku earthquake.

== Effects ==
Despite its considerable magnitude the earthquake caused only localised light to moderate structural damage in Chiba, owing in part to Japan's advanced earthquake engineering. The most significant effects occurred in Chōshi and Katori cities, where a few walls collapsed and several buildings sustained damage. In Funabashi city an elderly resident suffered a fatal heart attack during the quake, and a falling object caused one minor injury in Kisarazu city.

== Background ==
A seismically volatile country, Japan frequently experiences natural disasters such as earthquakes, volcanic eruptions and tsunamis. The entire archipelago forms a part of the Pacific Ring of Fire, a massive belt of volcanoes and trenches. The largest of the islands, Honshu is characterised by numerous inland fault systems and large subduction zones which are a result of the interaction between several tectonic plates. At the junction of the continental Okhotsk microplate and the oceanic Philippine Sea and Pacific plates lies the populous Kantō Region, which has had a long history of devastating earthquakes.

Situated on the Bōsō Peninsula in eastern Kantō, Chiba Prefecture is surrounded by a region of complex tectonic settings. To the south the Philippine Sea plate is subducted beneath Okhotsk Plate creating the offshore Sagami Trench; the Pacific plate subducts the region from the east, forming the Japan Trench. Despite this Chiba Prefecture has experienced relatively little effects from earthquakes. Since 1923 most events have occurred well offshore, within the magnitude 5.0–6.0 M_{j} range, at somewhat shallow focal depths. The most significant earthquake, known as the 1987 Chiba-ken Toho-oki earthquake, occurred on 17 December 1987.

== See also ==
- List of earthquakes in 2012
- List of earthquakes in Japan
