= 2008 Iwate–Miyagi Nairiku earthquake =

Earthquake in Japan

Iwate–Miyagi Nairiku earthquake
- 岩手・宮城内陸地震
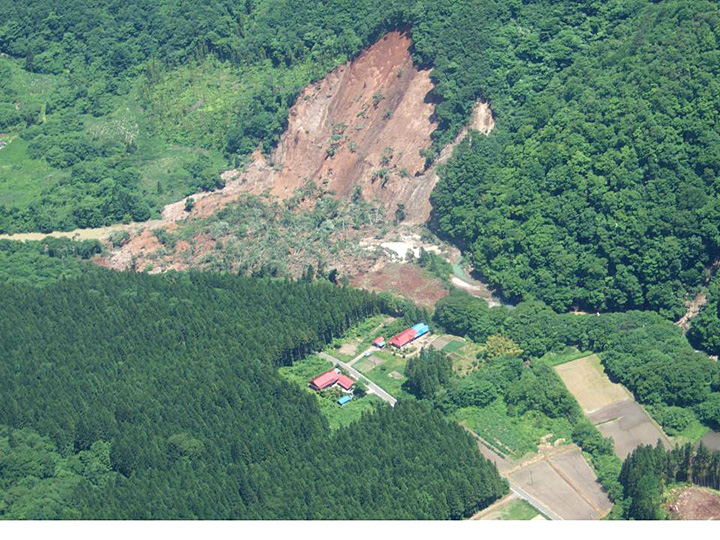
- River channel blockage in the Sako River after the earthquake

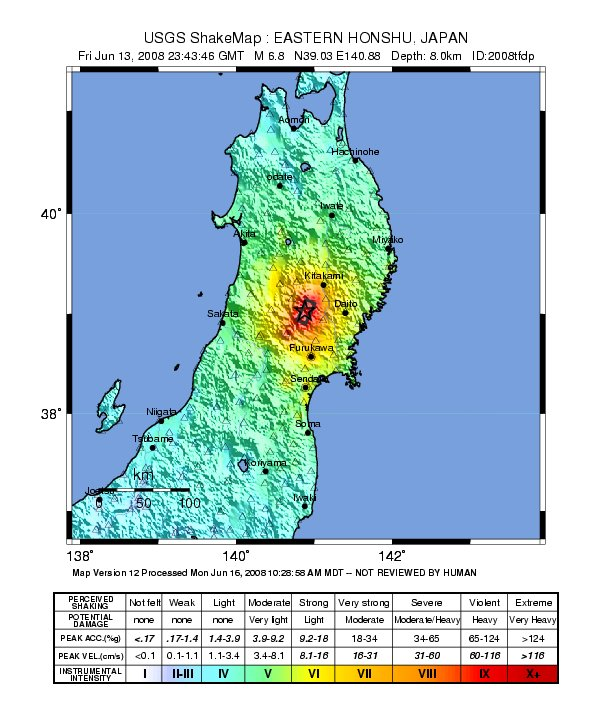
- USGS ShakeMap

- Location within Japan
- UTC time: 2008-06-13 23:43:45
- ISC event: 13377361
- USGS-ANSS: ComCat
- Local date: 14 June 2008
- Local time: 08:43 JST
- Magnitude: 7.2 M_{JMA} 6.9 M_{w}
- Depth: 10 km (6 mi) (USGS) 8 km (5 mi) (JMA)
- Epicenter: 39°01.7′N 140°52.8′E
- Type: Reverse – Intraplate
- Areas affected: Iwate Prefecture, Tōhoku region, Japan
- Max. intensity: JMA 6+ (MMI VII)
- Peak acceleration: 4.36 g (vector sum); 4278 Gal
- Aftershocks: 483 felt aftershocks by 1 July (JMA); Largest: M_{JMA} 5.7 on 14 June (9:20 JST)
- Casualties: 12 dead, 436 injured (1 July 2008 at 17:00 JST)

On 14 June, the 2008 Iwate earthquake struck the Tōhoku region of northeastern Honshū in Japan. Japan Meteorological Agency (JMA) officially named this earthquake the Iwate–Miyagi Nairiku earthquake in 2008 (平成20年（2008年）岩手・宮城内陸地震). This earthquake occurred in the south of the inland of Iwate Prefecture at 8:43 JST on June 14 (23:43 UTC on June 13). The JMA magnitude was estimated at M_{JMA}7.2, and the moment magnitude by USGS was at M_{w} 6.9. The epicenter was located at 39°01.7′N 140°52.8′E, about 85 kilometres (55 mi) north of Sendai and about 385 kilometres (240 mi) north-northeast of Tokyo.

The strongest shaking was measured in the cities of Ōshū (Iwate) and Kurihara (Miyagi), both of which were measured as "strong 6" on the Japan Meteorological Agency seismic intensity scale, shindo (震度, shindo). Peak ground acceleration readings were exceptionally high, with a maximum vector sum (3 component) value of 4,278 cm/s^{2} (4.36 g).

== Intensity ==
Seismic intensity (震度, Shindo) represents the strength of ground motion. JMA uses the scales of 0 to 7: 0, 1, 2, 3, 4, weak/strong 5, weak/strong 6, 7.

Prefecture	Seismic intensities							
Iwate	6+	6-	5+	5-	4	3	2	
Miyagi	6+	6-	5+	5-	4	3		
Akita			5+	5-	4	3	2	
Yamagata				5-	4	3	2	
Fukushima				5-	4	3	2	1
Aomori					4	3	2	1
Ibaraki					4	3	2	
Tochigi					4	3	2	1
Niigata					4	3	2	1
Hokkaidō						3	2	1
Gunma						3	2	1
Saitama						3	2	1
Chiba						3	2	1
Tokyo						3	2	1
Kanagawa						3	2	1
Yamanashi						3	2	1
Ishikawa							2	1
Nagano							2	1
Shizuoka							2	1
Aichi								1

Tremors were felt across a large area.

Intensity	Prefecture	Location
6+	Iwate	Ōshū
6+	Miyagi	Kurihara
6-	Miyagi	Osaki
5+	Akita	Yuzawa, Higashinaruse
5+	Iwate	Kitakami, Ichinoseki, Kanegasaki, Hiraizumi
5+	Miyagi	Kami, Wakuya, Tome, Misato, Natori, Sendai (Miyagino, Wakabayashi), Rifu
5-	Akita	Yokote, Ugo, Misato, Daisen
5-	Iwate	Tono, Fujisawa, Nishiwaga
5-	Miyagi	Shikama, Kakuda, Iwanuma, Zao, Ogawara, Kawasaki, Sendai (Aoba, Izumi), Ishinomaki, Ohira
5-	Yamagata	Mogami
5-	Fukushima	Shinchi

== Tectonics ==
According to the United States Geological Survey:

The Mw 6.8 Honshu earthquake of June 13th 2008 occurred in a region of convergence between the Pacific plate and the Okhotsk section of the North American plate in northern Japan, where the Pacific plate is moving west-northwest with respect to North America at a rate of approximately 8.3 cm/yr. The hypocenter of the earthquake indicates shallow thrusting motion in the upper (Okhotsk) plate, above the subducting Pacific plate, which lies at approximately 80 km depth at this location.

The earthquake occurred in a region of upper-plate contraction, probably within the complicated tectonics of the Ou Backbone Range, known to have hosted several large earthquakes in historic times. The largest of these events occurred in 1896, approximately 70 km north of the June 13th event, and killed over 200 people in the local area.

== Aftershocks ==
According to JMA:

Aftershocks of this earthquake were stronger than the Great Hanshin earthquake in 1995, but they happened much less frequently.

Over 200 aftershocks were observed in the first 24 hours, with about 400 in total over the first seven days. The largest ones (with M_{j}5.0 or greater) were

June 14, 9:20: M_{j}5.7: seismic intensity 5+;
June 14, 12:27: M_{j}5.2: intensity 4;
June 16, 23:14: M_{j}5.3: intensity 4.

From June 21 to July 1, four to twelve aftershocks were observed each day, with seismic intensity of 3.

== Effects ==
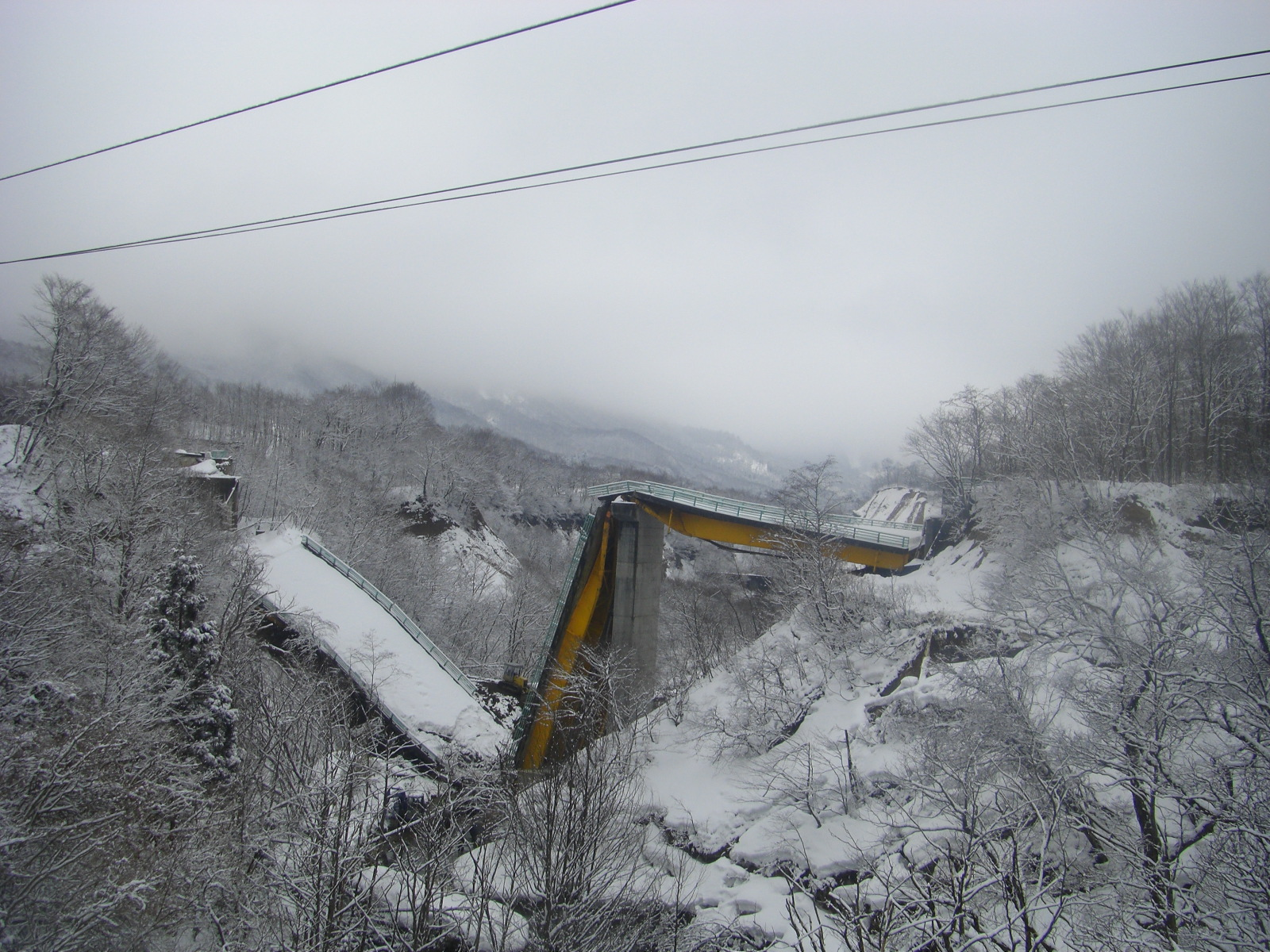
Riho Bridge collapsed after the earthquake

=== Landslides ===
Landslides triggered by this earthquake crushed structures, buried people, cut off access to certain roads, and isolated some rural communities. Mud from landslides dammed up rivers to form lakes called "quake lakes" (せき止め湖, sekitomeko).

By June 19, the Ministry of Land had identified fifteen quake lakes in Iwate and Miyagi prefectures, and work crews began draining three of them which were at high risk of overflow or breach from rain or aftershocks.

=== Human casualties ===
By 17:50 JST, June 25, twelve people were confirmed dead and 358 injured, and ten still missing.

- In the city of Kurihara, Miyagi Pref., five people were buried in a landslide at a hot-spring inn called Komanoyu, which had stood on the mountainside of Mt. Kurikoma. A woman aged 80 who had co-managed the inn with her husband, her 58-year-old son, a woman aged 75 who had worked at the inn, a 48-year-old tourism consultant, and an attendant of the Railway Museum aged 35 were all killed in the landslide.
- In the city of Kurihara, along Route 398, a landslide overwhelmed and killed three workers setting a rockfall containment net on a hillside.
- Also in the city of Kurihara, along Route 398, a 59-year-old man was killed when his car was carried away by a landslide and buried.
- At a dam construction site in the city of Ōshū, Iwate Pref., a worker aged 48 was struck by falling rocks and died.
- In the city of Ichinoseki, Iwate Pref., a person surprised by the tremor ran out into the road and was fatally struck by a truck.
- In the city of Iwaki, Fukushima Pref., near a fishing port, a person aged 55 was struck by falling rocks while fishing, fell into the sea, and drowned.
- In the city of Ōshū, a landslide caused a group of 20 people to become temporarily trapped in an overturned bus. Eight of them were injured, including one critically and five seriously. The bus was running when overturned, and ten passengers escaped, prompted by the driver. Then an aftershock caused the bus to slip down slowly into a ravine until it was caught on some trees. One of the passengers who had escaped walked down the road with a mobile phone until he was able to get a signal, and made an emergency call.

=== Electric power supply ===
No nuclear power plants were shut down following this earthquake unlike the 2007 Chūetsu offshore earthquake quake. Some water was found to have splashed out of a reaction container in the Fukushima II Nuclear Power Plant possibly due to the tremor, but no radioactive material was released to the environment.

=== Expressways and railways ===
Expressways in Tōhoku region were closed in several sections, but all reopened by nighttime, barring traffic restrictions in one section for repair work.

Some train services by JR East were suspended on Shinkansen and local lines, and resumed on the following day from the first scheduled trains.

On Tōhoku Shinkansen, all running trains, about 20, were stopped by an earthquake detection system. Most were soon moved to the nearest stations. However, about 2,000 passengers were temporarily trapped inside three trains before being evacuated up to nine and a half hours later, because the trains were forced to stay in place while equipment inspections were carried out.

Suspensions on Tōhoku, Akita, Yamagata Shinkansen and delays on Jōetsu, Nagano Shinkansen reportedly involved 117,000 passengers. No trains derailed.

== See also ==
- List of earthquakes in 2008
- List of earthquakes in Japan
