= 1993 Okushiri earthquake =

Earthquake in Japan

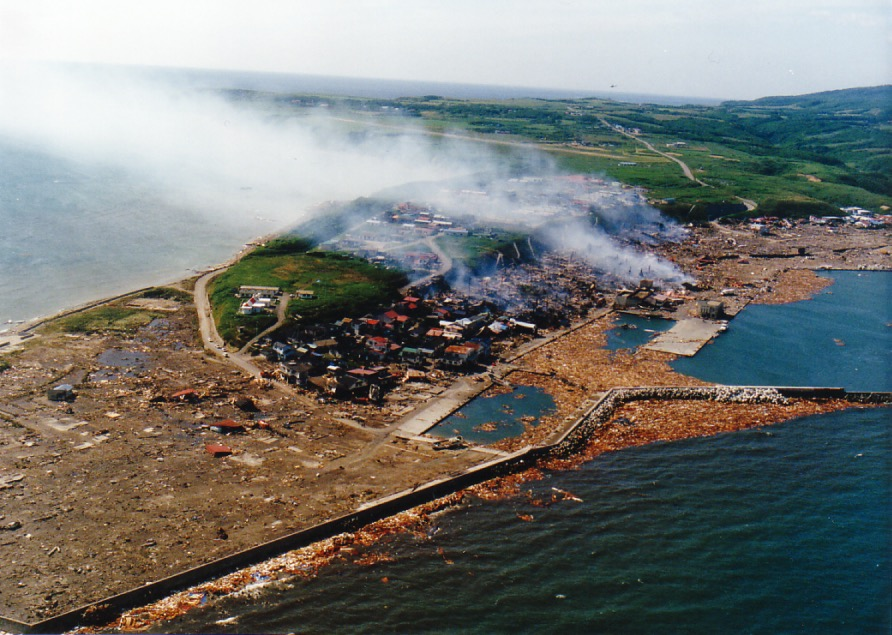
- Aerial view of tsunami damage on Okushiri Island.

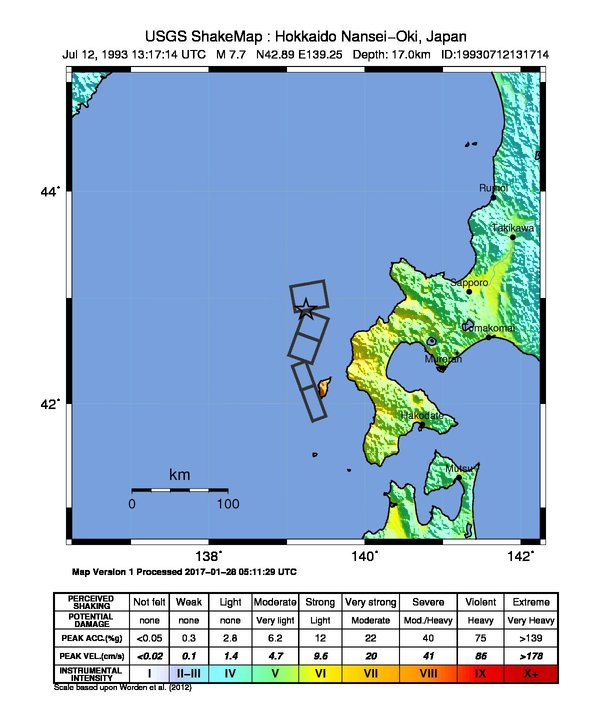

- Location within Japan
- UTC time: 1993-07-12 13:17:11
- ISC event: 219326
- USGS-ANSS: ComCat
- Local date: July 12, 1993
- Local time: 22:17
- Magnitude: 7.7 M_{w}
- Depth: 16.7 km (10.4 mi)
- Epicenter: 42.851°N 139.197°E
- Areas affected: Japan, Hokkaido
- Max. intensity: JMA 5 MMI VIII (Severe)
- Tsunami: Yes
- Casualties: 230 dead

The 1993 southwest-off Hokkaido earthquake (北海道南西沖地震, Hokkaidō Nansei Oki Jishin) or Okushiri earthquake occurred at 13:17:12 UTC on 12 July 1993 in the Sea of Japan near the island of Hokkaido. It had a magnitude of 7.7 on the moment magnitude scale and a maximum felt intensity of VIII (Severe) on the Mercalli intensity scale. It triggered a major tsunami that caused deaths on Hokkaidō and in southeastern Russia, with a total of 230 fatalities recorded. The island of Okushiri was hardest hit, with 165 casualties from the earthquake, the tsunami and a large landslide.

== Tectonic setting ==
The northwestern side of Honshu lies on the southeastern margin of the Sea of Japan, an area of oceanic crust created by back-arc spreading associated with the convergent boundary where the Pacific plate is subducted beneath the Okhotsk microplate. The spreading was active from the late Oligocene to the middle Miocene. The extensional tectonics associated with the spreading formed a series of N–S trending extensional faults and associated sedimentary basins. Currently the area is being deformed by contractional tectonics, causing inversion of these earlier basins, forming anticlinal structures. It has been suggested that the northwestern coast of Honshu represents an incipient subduction zone, but there remain significant uncertainties about the existence of the Okhotsk Plate and the nature and precise location of its boundary in the Sea of Japan, if it does exist.

This region has been the location for several historical earthquakes, such as the 1964 Niigata and 1983 Sea of Japan earthquakes, with reverse fault mechanisms, on faults trending approximately north–south.

== Damage ==
The earthquake shaking caused moderately severe damage, VIII on the Mercalli scale. The tsunami reached Okushiri between 2 and 7 minutes after the earthquake. A tsunami warning was given 5 minutes after the earthquake by the JMA. However, this was too late for the inhabitants of Okushiri. The quake caused fires to start in the town of Okushiri, adding greatly to the total damage.

== Characteristics ==
=== Earthquake ===
The earthquake had two distinct shocks. The first lasted for 20 seconds, while the second lasted 35 seconds.

The rupture occurred on a fault that dipped at 24 degrees to the east. It had an estimated length of 150 km with a displacement of 2.5 m. The island of Okushiri subsided by 5–80 cm.

=== Tsunami ===
The resulting tsunami inundated large parts of Okushiri, despite its tsunami defences. Okushiri had been struck by another tsunami 10 years earlier. A maximum run-up of 32 m was recorded on the western part of the island near Monai. A tsunami was widely observed in the Sea of Japan with a run-up of 3.5 m at Akita in northern Honshu, up to 4.0 m in southeastern Russia and up to 2.6 m on the coast of South Korea.

=== Landslide ===
The Okushiri-port landslide involved a volume of 150,000 m^{3} of rock. The slide failure occurred at the base of a volcanic breccia bed. The slide occurred in two phases that may match the two separate shocks recorded for the earthquake.

== Aftermath ==
The destructive power of this tsunami led to an overhaul of the sea defences on Okushiri involving the construction of tsunami sluices on a river and strengthened embankments. New escape routes were also provided and help was given for households to purchase emergency broadcast receivers.

== See also ==
- List of earthquakes in 1993
- List of earthquakes in Japan
- 1993 Kushiro earthquake
