= National Research Institute for Earth Science and Disaster Resilience =

Research institute in Japan

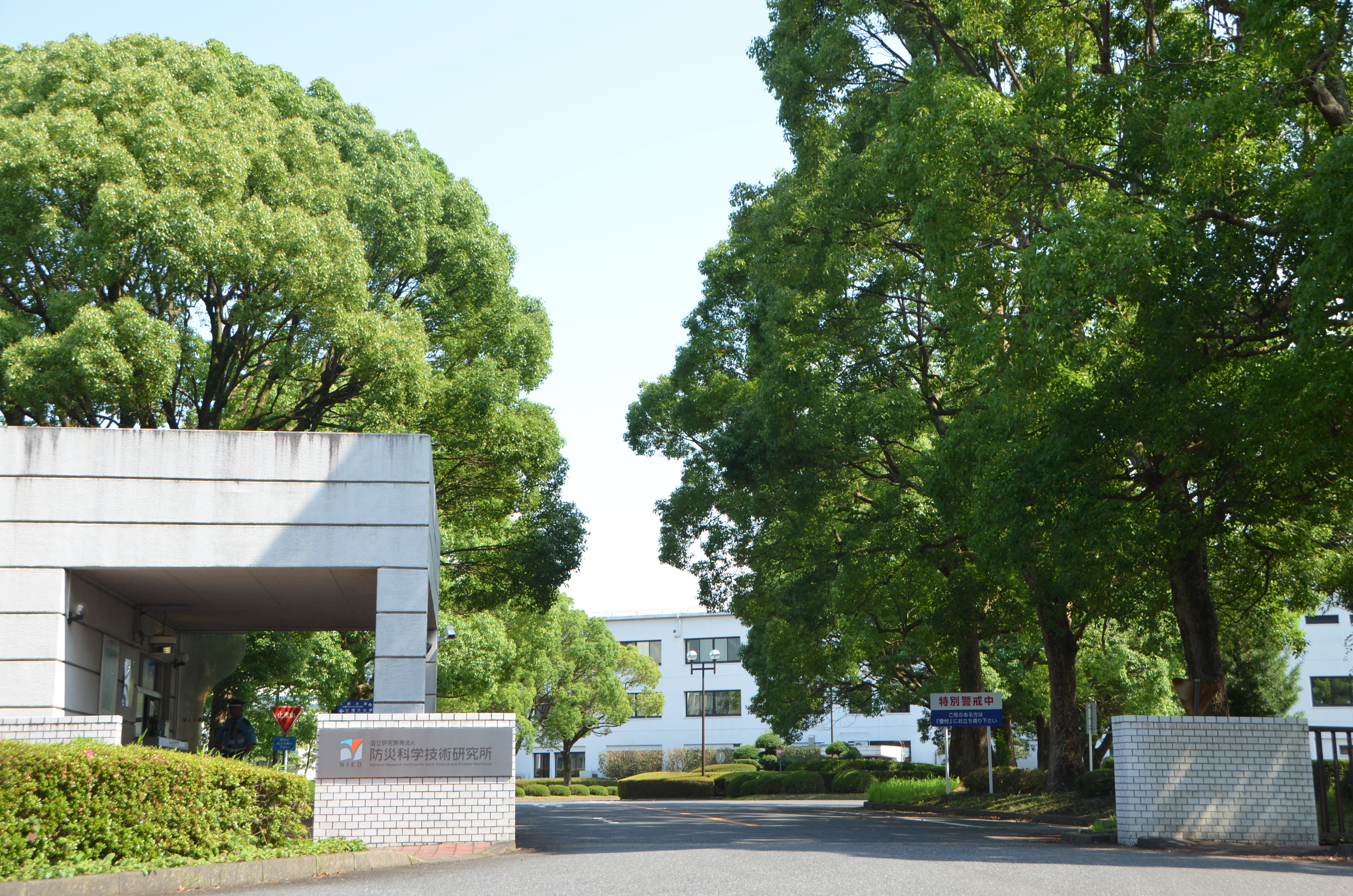
- NIED Headquarters in Tsukuba, Ibaraki, Japan
- Abbreviation: NIED
- Formation: April 1, 1963
- Headquarters: 3-1 Tennodai, Tsukuba, Ibaraki 305-0006, JAPAN
- President: TAKARA Kaoru
- Affiliations: Ministry of Education, Culture, Sports, Science and Technology (MEXT)
- Budget: 13.8 billion yen (annual operating budget) as of April 2025
- Employees: 344 (including 157 researchers, 185 administrative staff) as of April 1, 2025
- Website: https://www.bosai.go.jp/e/

The National Research Institute for Earth Science and Disaster Resilience (Japanese: 防災科学技術研究所, romanized: Bōsai Kagaku Gijutsu Kenkyū-sho), also known as NIED, is a National Research and Development Agency that conducts research on science and technology related to disaster risk reduction. It owns experimental and observational facilities throughout Japan. The headquarters is located in Tsukuba City, Ibaraki Prefecture.

== History ==
The history can be broken into phases:

1960s – 1970s

- April 1963: National Research Center for Disaster Prevention (NRCDP) established in Tokyo
- December 1964: Institute of Snow and Ice Studies established in Nagaoka
- October 1969: Shinjo Branch established
- June 1970: Large-Scale Earthquake Simulator constructed in Tsukuba
- March 1974: Large-Scale Rainfall Simulator constructed in Tsukuba
- April 1978: Headquarters moved from Tokyo to Tsukuba

1990s – 2000s

- June 1990: NRCDP reorganized as NIED
- June 1996: K-NET (Kyoshin Net) starts operation
- March 1997: Cryospheric Environment Simulator constructed in Shinjo
- April 1997: Construction and operation of Hi-net (High sensitivity seismograph network), KiK-net (Kiban Kyoshi-net), and F-net (Broad-band seismograph network)
- January 2001: NIED becomes under the jurisdiction of MEXT
- October 2004: Hyogo Earthquake Engineering Research Center established in Miki
- April 2005: E-Defense (Three-dimensional full-scale earthquake testing facility) starts operation

2010s – 2020s

- April 2010: Operation of V-net (The Fundamental Volcano Observation Network) starts
- April 2016: DONET (Dense Ocean floor Network system for Earthquakes and Tsunamis) transferred to NIED
- November 2017: Operation of MOWLAS (Monitoring of Waves on Land and Seafloor) starts
- February 2019: Construction of N-net (Nankai Trough Seafloor Observation Network for Earthquakes and Tsunamis) starts
- November 2021: I-Resilience Corporation established as a joint venture company
- November 2023: 60th anniversary of establishment

== List of presidents ==
- WADATI Kiyoo (April 1, 1963 – August 5, 1966)
- TERADA Kazuhiko (August 16, 1966 – November 17, 1971)
- SUGAWARA Masami (April 14, 1972 – May 31, 1975)
- OHHIRA Naruto (June 1, 1975 – July 31, 1983)
- TAKAHASHI Hiroshi (August 1, 1983 – March 31, 1989)
- HAGIWARA Yukio (April 1, 1989 – March 31, 1992)
- UEHARA Shigetsugu (April 1, 1992 – August 31, 1996)
- KATAYAMA Tsuneo (September 1, 1996 – March 31, 2006)
- OKADA Yoshimitsu (April 1, 2006 – September 30, 2015)
- HAYASHI Haruo (October 1, 2015 – March 31, 2023)
- TAKARA Kaoru (April 1, 2023 – )

== Locations ==
- Tsukuba HQs (Tsukuba, Ibaraki Prefecture)
- Snow and Ice Research Center (Nagaoka, Niigata Prefecture)
- Snow and Ice Research Center, Shinjo Cryospheric Environment Laboratory (Shinjo, Yamagata Prefecture)
- Hyogo Earthquake Engineering Research Center (Miki, Hyogo Prefecture)

== Research Facilities/Observation Networks ==
- Three-Dimensional Full-Scale Earthquake Testing Facility “E-Defense” (Miki, Hyogo Prefecture)
- Large-scale Rainfall Simulator (Tsukuba, Ibaraki Prefecture)
- Cryospheric Environment Simulator (Shinjo, Yamagata Prefecture)
- Severe Storm Observing System (Tsukuba, Ibaraki Prefecture and other)
- "MOWLAS" (Monitoring of Waves on Land and Seafloor)

== International activities ==
NIED established and has been the secretariat of the Japan Hub of Disaster Resilience Partners (JHoP), a research network of 17 national universities, research institutes and other disaster management organizations in Japan since 2019. In 2021, JHoP established ICoE-Coherence (International Center of Excellence for Coherence among Disaster Risk Reduction, Climate Change Adaptation, and Sustainable Development) to promote international research on disaster risk reduction and management under the framework of Integrated Research on Disaster Risk (IRDR), which is supported by the International Science Council (ISC) and the United Nations Office for Disaster Risk Reduction (UNDRR).

NIED also conducts various international activities in disaster science employing knowledge and experience from Japan such as:

- Asian Consortium on Volcanology (ACV)
- Climate-induced geohazards mitigation, management, and education in Japan, South Korea, and Norway (GEOMME)
- Joint research with Natural Hazards Engineering Research Infrastructure (NHERI), United States
- Enhancement of Earthquake and Volcano Monitoring and Effective Utilization of Disaster Mitigation Information in the Philippines
