= Japan Meteorological Agency seismic intensity scale =

Japanese earthquake measurements

The Japan Meteorological Agency (JMA) Seismic Intensity Scale (Note: This is the official name; see http://www.jma.go.jp/jma/en/Activities/earthquake.html and http://www.jma.go.jp/jma/en/Activities/inttable.html, both of which treat it as a proper noun.) (known in Japan as the Shindo (震度) seismic scale) is a seismic intensity scale used in Japan to categorize the intensity of local ground shaking caused by earthquakes.

The JMA intensity scale differs from magnitude measurements like the moment magnitude (M_{w}) and the earlier Richter scales, which represent how much energy an earthquake releases. Similar to the Mercalli scale, the JMA scale measures the intensities of ground shaking at various observation points within the affected area. Intensities are expressed as numerical values called shindo (震度, "seismic intensity"); the higher the value, the more intense the shaking. Values are derived from ground acceleration and duration of the shaking, which are themselves influenced by factors such as distance to and depth of the hypocenter (focus), local soil conditions, and nature of the geology in between, as well as the event's magnitude; every quake thus entails numerous intensities.

Intensity data is collected from 4,400 observation stations equipped with "Model 95 seismic intensity meters" that measure strong ground motion. The agency provides authorities and the general public with real-time reports through the media and Internet giving event time, epicenter (location), magnitude, and depth followed by intensity readings at affected localities.

== Scale overview ==
The JMA scale is expressed in levels of seismic intensity from 0 to 7 in a manner similar to that of the Mercalli intensity scale, which is not commonly used in Japan. The JMA uses seismic intensity meters to automatically calculate ground acceleration in real-time, reporting intensities based on measurements from observation points.

JMA Seismic Intensity Scale
Intensity	Category	Effects on people	Indoors	Outdoors	Wooden houses	Reinforced concrete buildings	Utilities and infrastructure	Ground and slopes	Mercalli equivalent (appr.)
0	N/A	Undetectable by humans but recorded by instruments.	No significant effect.						I
1	Mild to moderate	Slightly noticeable to some people who are quiet indoors.	No significant effect.						II
2	Mild to moderate	Noticeable to many quiet people indoors; may wake a few.	Hanging objects (e.g., lamps) sway slightly.	No significant effect.					III
3	Mild to moderate	Felt by most indoors; some walking people notice; many awake.	Dishes may rattle in cupboards.	Power lines sway slightly.	No significant effect.				IV
4	Mild to moderate	Startles most; felt by nearly everyone walking; awakens most people.	Lamps swing noticeably, dishes rattle, and unstable items may fall.	Power lines sway visibly; drivers may sense shaking.	No significant effect.		Rail and road services may halt for safety checks; speed limits may be enforced.	No significant effect.	V
5− (5弱) 5 Lower	Strong	Frightens many; they may grab onto stable objects.	Lamps swing violently; items on shelves fall; some furniture may shift or topple.	Windows might crack; utility poles move; minor road damage possible.	Small cracks may appear in walls of low earthquake resistance houses.	No significant effect.	Automatic safety valves cut off residential gas. Disruptions to water and electricity possible.	Minor cracks; some liquefaction possible. Rockfalls and small landslides may occur.	VI
5+ (5強) 5 Upper	Strong	Movement is difficult without support.	Items fall more often; TVs may topple; unsecured furniture likely to tip.	Walls may collapse; poorly installed vending machines may fall over; driving becomes hazardous.	Walls may crack in low earthquake resistance houses.	Cracks may form in walls, beams, and pillars of low earthquake resistance buildings.	Gas pipes and/or water mains may be damaged. Gas and/or water service are disrupted in some regions. Blackouts possible.	Minor cracks; some liquefaction possible. Rockfalls and small landslides may occur.	VII
6− (6弱) 6 Lower	Strong	Standing is difficult.	Most furniture moves or tips; doors may jam.	Wall tiles and windows sustain damage and may fall.	For less resistant houses, walls crack more often; houses may lean or collapse. Small cracks may form in walls of more resistant houses.	For less resistant buildings, cracks occur more often; X-shaped cracks may develop. Cracks may appear in structural elements of more resistant buildings.	Gas pipes and/or water mains are damaged. Gas, water and electricity services are disrupted.	Cracks appear. Landslides and terrain shifts are likely.	VIII
6+ (6強) 6 Upper	Brutal	Standing is impossible; moving is only possible by crawling. People may be thrown through the air.	Most unsecured furniture shifts or topples.	Wall tiles and windows are highly likely to fall; unreinforced concrete-block walls collapse.	Low earthquake resistance houses are likely to lean or collapse. Larger cracks are possible in more resistant houses.	Ground-level pillars may break; collapse is possible for less resistant structures. For more resistant structures, cracks become more widespread; walls may slip.	Gas pipes and water mains are damaged. Gas, water and electricity services are disrupted.	Larger cracks develop. Landslides occur.	IX
7	Brutal	Standing is impossible; moving is only possible by crawling. People may be thrown through the air.	Most unsecured furniture is thrown or topples violently.	Wall tiles and windows are almost certain to fall; reinforced concrete-block walls may collapse.	Less resistant houses are highly likely to collapse. For more resistant houses, cracks are more frequent and leaning may occur.	Most or all buildings (even earthquake-resistant ones) suffer severe damage.	Gas pipes and water mains are damaged. Gas, water and electricity services are disrupted.	The ground is considerably distorted by extensive cracks; massive landslides and debris flows happen, which can change topographic features.	X+

== History ==
=== Establishment and revision ===
Seismic observations in Japan began in 1872. In 1884, Sekiya Seikei, Director of the Earthquake Division under the Home Ministry, compiled the 18-article "Earthquake Report Guidelines" and initiated data collection from 600 county offices nationwide. This was Japan's first unified seismic intensity scale. At that time, the scale had four levels: bishin (微震, faint tremor), jakushin (弱震, weak tremor), kyōshin (強震, strong tremor), and retsushin (烈震, violent tremor). For example, a faint tremor event was described with a brief explanation, such as "Slightly felt by those who have experience of earthquakes".

In 1898, the scale was expanded to include "faint tremor (no sensation)" and intermediate levels such as "weak tremor (slightly weaker intensity)" and "strong tremor (slightly weaker intensity)." The scale expanded to 7 levels, numbered from 0 to 6, but at this point, explanatory text was omitted. In 1908, explanatory text was reinstated for each level. In 1936, the "Earthquake Observation Law," which is the current guideline for seismic observation, was established, and the terms for faint tremor (no sensation), weak tremor (slightly weaker intensity), and strong tremor (slightly weaker intensity) were renamed to "no feeling," "light tremor," and "moderate tremor". During this time, the number of observation points further increased. According to materials from the JMA, in 1904, there were 1,437 observation points including both official stations and private contracted stations (e.g., local observation posts), and this number remained stable until the 1950s (around 1955-1964).

In January 1949, the "Earthquake Observation Law" was revised to establish intensity 7, and the scale was expanded to 8 levels, from 0 to 7; this was because concern arose that damage caused by the 1948 Fukui earthquake, which saw over 90% house collapse in some areas, could not be accurately expressed with intensity 6. Furthermore, the judgment for intensity 7 was based on a field survey conducted later by the JMA's mobile observation team, with specific criteria like "house collapse rate of 30% or more." During this revision, the terms "no feeling," "slight," "weak," "rather strong," "strong," "very strong," "disastrous," and "very disastrous" were assigned to each intensity level. Seismic intensity was also made a factor in tsunami forecasting, and descriptions of the sensation of intensity 4 and 6 were added to the explanatory text for quicker judgment. Later, in 1978, the sensation of all intensity levels was added.

=== Transition to instrumental measurements ===
Previously, JMA staff determined seismic intensity by observing ground shaking and building damage, matching their observations to a guideline chart. Although guidelines existed, intensity assessments were subjective and lacked consistency. In the early years of the Heisei era, it took around 10 minutes or longer for each meteorological station to collect seismic information and issue a report along with the estimated scale.

Between 1958 and 1969, the number of seismic observation points dropped from over 1,000 to about 150 due to station consolidations and closures. As a result, issues such as a lack of seismic observation points, subjective judgments by observers, variability in damage from intensities above level 5, and delays in issuing intensity reports emerged. These challenges led to the consideration of using automatic instruments for seismic intensity measurement, and in 1985, a committee was established within the JMA to explore the use of instruments. In 1988, based on the committee's report, experimental measurements using seismometers began, and by March 1994, seismometers were installed at all observation points. During this period, observation points increased to 300 in 1993 and 600 in 1996.

Meanwhile, major earthquakes such as the 1994 offshore Sanriku earthquake and the 1995 Great Hanshin Earthquake revealed issues like wide variability in damage in areas with intensities 5 and 6, as well as delays in determining intensity 7 (which required field surveys by the JMA's mobile observation team). These issues highlighted the need for quicker and more detailed damage assessment.

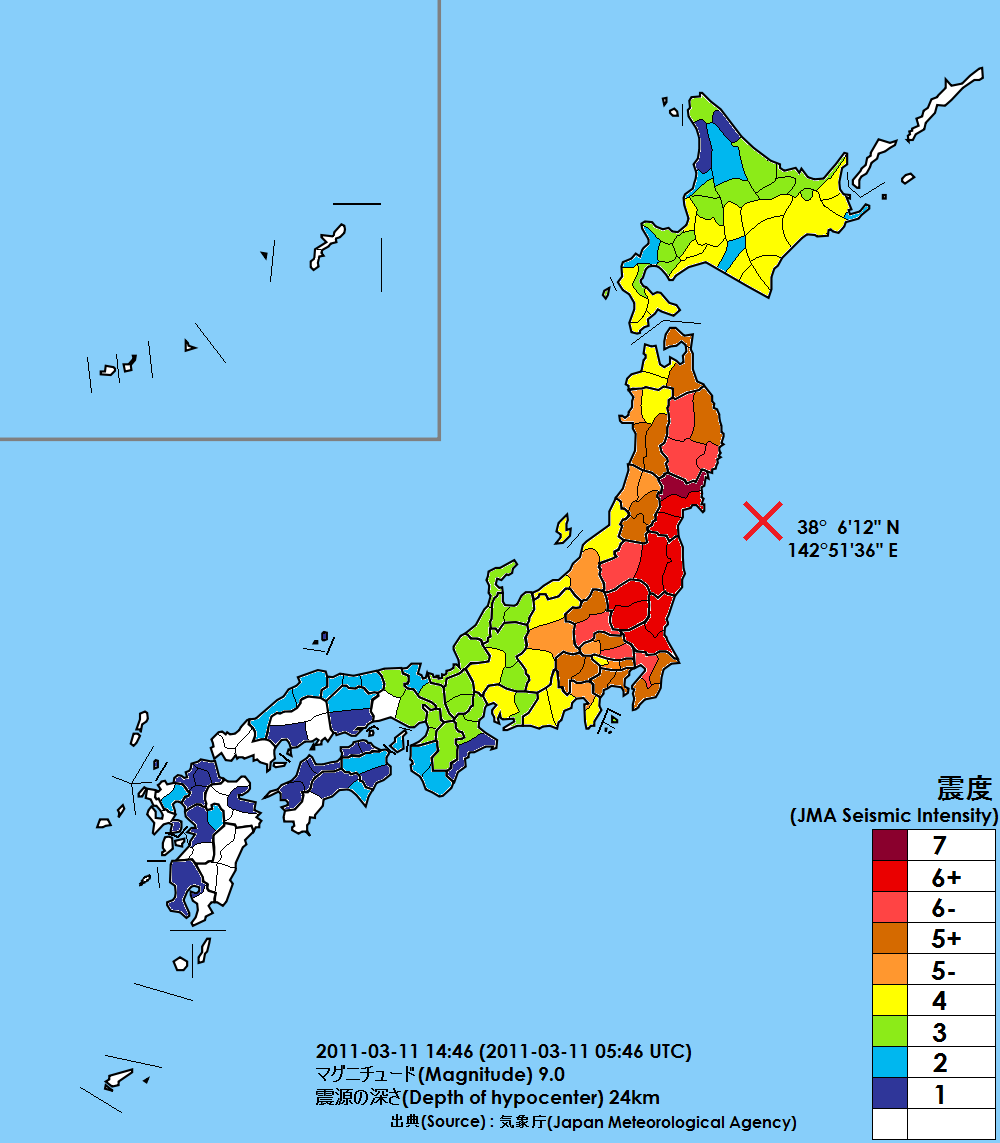
Map of Japan showing the distribution of maximum JMA Seismic Intensities by prefecture for the 2011 Tōhoku Earthquake

On April 1, 1996, the scale was revised, eliminating sensory-based observations and fully transitioning to instrument-based measurements. This placed the JMA scale among non-Cancani macroseismic scales, distinguishing it from those belonging to the 12-degree Cancani family, such as the Modified Mercalli intensity scale or the European macroseismic scale. Levels 5 and 6 were subdivided into "lower" and "upper," creating a 10-level scale. As a result, terms like "faint tremor" and "light tremor" were discontinued, and a new "related explanatory table" was created to provide explanations previously contained in the old descriptions. Additionally, seismic intensity level 7, which had been determined by damage rates, was standardized with instrumental observations, with a level of 6.5 or higher on the instrumental scale being classified as intensity 7 on the 10-level scale. Furthermore, in addition to the approximately 600 JMA observation points, data from around 800 sites operated by the National Research Institute for Earth Science and Disaster Resilience (NIED) and about 2,800 local government sites were also used for JMA reports, increasing the total number of observation points to about 4,200, a significant increase from previous levels.

== Intensity 7 ==
Intensity 7 (震度7, Shindo-nana) is the highest level on the JMA seismic intensity scale, earthquakes of this intensity are referred to as "brutally devastating earthquakes". At Intensity 7, movement at will is almost impossible, and people may be thrown through the air. The intensity was created following the 1948 Fukui earthquake. It was observed for the first time in the 1995 Great Hanshin earthquake.

Intensity 7 earthquakes
Earthquake	Date	Magnitude	Area of Intensity 7
1995 Great Hanshin earthquake	January 17, 1995	6.9 M_{w}	Kobe, Nishinomiya, Ashiya, Takarazuka, Tsuna, Hokudan, Ichinomiya (Hyogo)
2004 Chūetsu earthquake	October 23, 2004	6.6 M_{w}	Kawaguchi (Niigata)
2011 Tōhoku earthquake	March 11, 2011	9.0 M_{w}	Kurihara (Miyagi)
2016 Kumamoto earthquakes	April 14, 2016	6.2 M_{w}	Mashiki (Kumamoto)
2016 Kumamoto earthquakes	April 16, 2016	7.0 M_{w}	Nishihara, Mashiki (Kumamoto)
2018 Hokkaido Eastern Iburi earthquake	September 6, 2018	6.6 M_{w}	Atsuma (Hokkaido)
2024 Noto earthquake	January 1, 2024	7.5 M_{w}	Shika, Wajima (Ishikawa)
2026 Kumamoto earthquake	July 28, 2026	6.8 M_{w}	Uki, Hikawa (Kumamoto)

== Seismic intensity measurement ==
=== Observation system ===
Since April 1997, Japan has been using specialized and automated strong ground motion accelerometers known as the "seismic intensity meter" to measure and report the strength of earthquakes based on the JMA scale. This replaces the old system that relied on human observation and damage assessment.

The installation of these meters began in 1988 with the "Model 87 seismic intensity meter," which were not capable of storing data and could only observe a moderate acceleration range. Later, the "Model 95 seismic intensity meter" was introduced, which had several improvements including the ability to observe acceleration higher than previous limits, a higher sampling rate and better resolution, along with the capability to record observed data in flash memory cards. As of March 1997, all of JMA's seismic intensity meters were replaced by this "Model 95" type.

By the end of 2009, about 4,200 of these meters were in use for JMA's "seismic intensity information," and by January 2023, this number had grown to around 4,400. Of these meters, around 700 are managed by the JMA, and roughly 3,700 by the National Research Institute for Earth Science and Disaster Resilience (NIED) and local government bodies. The JMA's meters are equipped with satellite communication mechanisms that allow them to transmit data in case of landline malfunctions; in the event of a major earthquake, the JMA assesses the integrity of its meters and/or set up temporary observation stations where necessary.

Besides the seismic intensity meters used by JMA, many other meters have been installed by local government bodies that are not used by JMA. Public institutions and transportation agencies have installed their own meters to monitor critical infrastructure such as dams, rivers, and railways.

=== Instrument installation ===
To ensure accurate earthquake intensity measurements, specific guidelines govern the proper installation of seismic intensity meters. The JMA excludes data from meters placed in unsuitable locations when assessing earthquake intensity.

Meters must be installed on robust, specially designed stands. Because embankments and cliffs can amplify ground shaking, it is crucial to place meters on flat, stable ground away from steps. At least two-thirds of the stand must be securely buried in the ground. Additionally, meters should be positioned far enough from nearby structures, such as trees or fences, to avoid potential impact from falling objects.

For indoor installations, meters should be placed on the ground floor near pillars, with acceptable locations ranging from the basement to the second floor. Buildings with earthquake isolation or vibration control systems are unsuitable for meter placement.

The JMA evaluates the installation quality of seismic intensity meters used for official earthquake intensity information. Each installation is scored based on its environmental conditions, with total scores assigned a grade from A to E. Installations graded A to C are deemed acceptable. D-rated meters may be used after thorough evaluation, while E-rated meters are excluded from use.

Seismic Intensity Meter Installation Environment Evaluation
Grade	Evaluation content	Usage restrictions in JMA information announcements
A	Excellent installation environment	None
B	Suitable for observing seismic intensity data for initial response decisions, though minor improvements are possible.	None
C	Capable of observing seismic intensity data for initial response decisions, but significant improvements are needed in the installation environment.	None
D	The observed seismic intensity may differ by approximately one level due to environmental factors or the relative position to the hypocenter. Careful checks are required before using data for initial response decisions.	Excluded from processing for Earthquake Early Warning; data may be used only after quality verification.
E	The observed seismic intensity is likely to differ significantly from the surrounding area, making it unsuitable for seismic intensity observation, especially during large earthquakes.	Not used for any seismic intensity information.

There have been instances where earthquake intensity data was used despite meters being installed in unsuitable locations, leading to questions about the accuracy of the information and subsequent corrections. One notable example occurred during the July 2008 Iwate earthquake, when Intensity 6+ was recorded in Ono, Hirono Town, Iwate Prefecture. This value was significantly higher than those reported in neighboring municipalities, prompting an investigation. On October 29 of the same year, the Japan Meteorological Agency (JMA) concluded that the meter in Ono was improperly installed for earthquake observation. As a result, it was removed from the earthquake intensity data, and the recorded maximum intensity was revised from 6+ to 6−.

=== Intensity calculation ===
Conversion between instrumental intensity and corresponding intensity level
Intensity	Instrumental intensity
0	<0.5
1	0.5−1.4
2	1.5−2.4
3	2.5−3.4
4	3.5−4.4
5−	4.5−4.9
5+	5.0−5.4
6−	5.5−5.9
6+	6.0−6.4
7	≥6.5

The seismic intensity meters used by the JMA and others observe shaking through accelerometers. They first measure three components of acceleration – vertical, north–south, and east–west – as time-domain signals. These are then converted into frequency-domain signals by the Fourier transform, filtered, then converted back into time-domain signals for final calculations. The specific process involved is as follows:

1. Apply the Fourier transform on time-domain signals to convert them into frequency-domain signals.
2. Apply a filter $\lambda_a(f) = F_{a1}(f)F_{a2}(f)F_{a3}(f)$, which is a product of several filters, to the frequency-domain signals, where $F_{a1}(f) = \sqrt{\frac{1}{f}}$ is the period effect filter; $F_{a2}(f) = (1 + \alpha x^2 + \beta x^4 + \gamma x^6 + \delta x^8 + \epsilon x^{10} + \zeta x^{12})^{-1/2}$ is the high-cut filter, where $\alpha = 0.694$, $\beta = 0.241$, $\gamma = 0.0557$, $\delta = 0.009664$, $\epsilon = 0.00134$, $\zeta = 0.000155$, $x = f/10$; $F_{a3}(f) = \sqrt{1 - \exp(-(f/0.5)^3)}$ is the low-cut filter.
3. Convert the filtered frequency-domain signals back into time-domain signals by inverse Fourier transform. Sum the acceleration components into a single composite acceleration by vector summation.
4. Find a value $a$ such that for exactly 0.3 seconds, the norm of the acceleration vector is no less than $a$.
5. Calculate $I = 2\log_{10} a + 0.94$.
6. Round $I$ to two decimal places, then truncate the second decimal place to determine the instrumental seismic intensity. Then, round the instrumental seismic intensity to the nearest integer to determine the seismic intensity. If the instrumental seismic intensity is negative, the seismic intensity is considered 0; if ≥8, the seismic intensity is considered 7. In case of Intensities 5 and 6, it is further divided into lower and upper depending on whether it is rounded up or down (refer to the table on the right).

== Information dissemination ==
=== Earthquake Information bulletins ===
When an earthquake occurs, the JMA announces the observed seismic intensity, the epicenter of the earthquake, and the presence or absence of a tsunami as “Earthquake Information" bulletins. Among them, those related to seismic intensity are listed below.

- Seismic Intensity Information: About a minute and a half after the earthquake, the JMA announces names of sub-prefectural regions observing Intensity 3 or higher.
- Earthquake and Seismic Intensity Information: If Intensity 1 or higher is observed, the JMA announces the hypocenter and magnitude of the event, seismic intensity observation points observing Intensity 1 or higher, and localities observing Intensity 3 or higher.
- Estimated Seismic Intensity Distribution Map: If Intensity 5− or higher is observed, the JMA issues an Estimated Seismic Intensity Distribution Map showing expected seismic intensity based on observational data, taking into account site amplification effects. The map contains seismic intensity distribution of areas observing Intensity 4 or higher. The seismic intensity distribution was estimated on a 1 km square grid before January 31, 2023, and on a 250m square grid since February 1, 2023.

When the initial seismic waves are observed at multiple locations and the maximum intensity is estimated to be at least 5−, an Earthquake Early Warning is issued for areas with an estimated intensity of 4 or higher. This is an alert to warn of strong earthquake tremors, not the observed seismic intensity.

Seismic intensity information is distributed to numerous parties, including mobile network operators, businesses licensed for earthquake forecasting or information dissemination, media outlets, Fire and Disaster Management Agency, prefectural governments, police, Japan Coast Guard and other designated public authorities, who then disseminate the information to the general public.

=== Internet ===
The JMA distributes earthquake information on its website, including information on time of occurrence, hypocenter location, depth, and seismic intensities across different regions.

On March 7, 2013, the JMA updated its website's color scheme for earthquake information to unify weather displays and improve accessibility for visually impaired and elderly users. All seismic intensity indicators are now displayed in different colors. Intensity 7 is indicated in dark purple (⬤), 6+ indicated in dark red (⬤), 6− indicated in red (⬤), 5+ indicated in orange (⬤), 5− indicated in yellow (⬤), 4 indicated in cream (⬤), 3 indicated in blue (⬤), 2 indicated in light blue (⬤) and 1 indicated in white (⬤).

The display for the epicenter was also modified. Previously, a red “×” mark (×) was used; after the update, a red “×” mark with a yellow border is now used.

Many Japanese news outlets also have dedicated pages on their websites distributing earthquake information, including seismic intensity information, from the JMA. Other major platforms also disseminate seismic intensity information, either through web, mobile apps or both, such as Yahoo Japan, Weathernews, and the NERV Disaster Prevention mobile app.

=== NIED strong-motion monitor ===
The National Research Institute for Earth Science and Disaster Resilience distributes realtime instrumental seismic intensity, peak ground acceleration, velocity, displacement, and velocity response of different frequencies (0.125 Hz − 4.0 Hz) data across stations of its network through a web service called the Strong-motion Monitor (強震モニタ).

The web service displays information on ongoing Earthquake Early Warning bulletins, realtime intensities at all observation points as an image, estimated epicenter location and expected propagation of P waves and S waves, along with predicted seismic intensity distribution represented as a 5 km square grid.

Various other businesses also provide access to the Strong-motion Monitor through their own platforms, such as Yahoo Japan through a web app and Gehirn Inc through their "NERV Disaster Prevention" mobile app.

== Disaster response based on seismic intensity ==
Administrative agencies obtain seismic intensity information from the JMA and other sources and use this information as a criterion for deciding the initial actions to be taken immediately after an earthquake. Generally, at Intensity 4 to 5− or higher, the National Police Agency and Fire and Disaster Management Agency (through a line of prefectural police headquarters to police stations, and prefectural fire and disaster management divisions to fire headquarters) begin investigations. If the intensity reaches 5− or higher, the Japan Coast Guard and Ministry of Defense carry out damage assessments. Specifically, helicopters from the regional Coast Guard offices that recorded the maximum intensity, fighter jets scrambled by Air Self-Defense Force squadrons, (Note: The reason reconnaissance planes are not used is that fighter jets are always in a standby state and can respond the fastest. Even at night, when visibility is poor, they can at least confirm that no fires have broken out.) and maritime patrol aircraft deployed by the Maritime Self-Defense Force are dispatched, and the crews conduct visual inspections. Additionally, if the intensity reaches 4 or higher, the Cabinet Office estimates earthquake damage. When an intensity of 5+ is recorded in Tokyo's 23 wards or 6− or higher elsewhere, the Emergency Response Team of the Prime Minister's Office calls an emergency meeting.

Since October 2007, the JMA has implemented the Earthquake Early Warning system for the general public. This system issues warnings when the estimated maximum intensity is 5− or greater, targeting regions expected to feel an intensity of 4 or more. For advanced users, the criteria include observations of ground accelerations over 100 gal, an estimated magnitude of 3.5 or higher, and an estimated maximum intensity of 3 or greater.

While the current intensity scale is emphasized for very short periods (0.1 to 1 second) that match human perception, damage to buildings is often associated with periods of 1 to 2 seconds. It has been proposed that for higher intensity levels, calculating intensity based on the elastic velocity response at 1 to 2 seconds correlates more closely with building damage and maintains continuity with the pre-1996 seismic intensity scale derived from observed damage.

Additionally, unlike traditional macroseismic scales, the modern JMA scale determines intensity using instrumental ground motion data, rather than observed effects. A paper by Musson et al. argues that this reliance has distanced the scale from macroseismology's original purpose: to describe human and structural impacts of earthquakes. The JMA scale's reliance on Japanese ground motion parameters and its unique subdivisions also makes it less suited for international comparisons with other scales, posing challenges when used outside Japan.

== Use outside Japan ==
In Taiwan, the seismic intensity scale used is a 10-point system similar to Japan's, known as the Central Weather Administration seismic intensity scale. Prior to this, Taiwan had adopted a scale identical to Japan's pre-September 1996 system, which had been established on August 1, 2000. However, this earlier scale did not include the subdivisions of intensity levels 5 and 6 into "upper" and "lower" categories, which had been introduced later in Japan.

In South Korea, a seismic intensity scale modeled after Japan's was used in the past, but since 2001, the country has switched to the Modified Mercalli intensity scale.

== See also ==
- Central Weather Administration seismic intensity scale
- Earthquake engineering
- Japanese Coordinating Committee for Earthquake Prediction
- List of earthquakes in Japan
- Nuclear power in Japan (seismicity section)
- Seismic intensity scales
- Seismic magnitude scales
