= List of earthquakes in 1994 =

Earthquakes in 1994
Approximate epicenters of notable earthquakes in 1994
- 4.0–5.9 magnitude
- 6.0–6.9 magnitude
- 7.0–7.9 magnitude
- 8.0+ magnitude
- Strongest: 8.3 M_{w} Russia
- Deadliest: 6.8 M_{w} (Colombia) Colombia; 1,100 deaths
- Total fatalities: 2,084

Number by magnitude
- 9.0+: 0

This is a list of earthquakes in 1994. Only earthquakes of magnitude 6 or above are included, unless they result in damage or casualties, or are notable for some other reason. All dates are listed according to UTC time.

== By death toll ==
Rank	Death toll	Magnitude	Location	MMI	Depth (km)	Date
1	1,100	6.8	Colombia, Cauca	IX (Violent)	12.0	June 6
2	250	7.8	Indonesia, Java	V (Moderate)	12.0	June 3
3	207	6.9	Indonesia, Lampung	X (Extreme)	23.1	February 15
4	171	5.9	Algeria, Mascara	VII (Very strong)	10.7	August 18
5	160	6.1	Afghanistan, Balkh	VII (Very strong)	18.5	May 1
6	78	7.1	Philippines, Mindoro	VII (Very strong)	31.5	November 15
7	57	6.7	United States, California	IX (Violent)	11.3	January 17
8	11	8.3	Russia, Kuril Islands	IX (Violent)	3.0	October 4

== By magnitude ==
Rank	Magnitude	Death toll	Location	MMI	Depth (km)	Date
1	8.3	11	Russia, Kuril Islands	IX (Violent)	3.0	October 4
2	8.2	5	Bolivia, La Paz	VI (Strong)	647.0	June 8
3	7.8	3	Japan, Honshu offshore	IX (Violent)	33.0	December 28
3	7.8	250	Indonesia, Java offshore	V (Moderate)	18.0	June 2
5	7.6	0	Fiji offshore	IV (Light)	562.5	March 9
6	7.3	0	Russia, Primorsky offshore	IV (Light)	471.4	July 21
6	7.3	0	Russia, Kuril Islands offshore	VI (Strong)	33.0	October 9
8	7.2	0	Vanuatu, Malampa offshore	VII (Very strong)	33.0	July 13
9	7.1	0	United States, California offshore	VI (Strong)	10.0	September 1
9	7.1	78	Philippines, Mindoro	VII (Very strong)	31.5	November 14
11	7.0	9	Indonesia, Halmahera	IX (Violent)	19.9	January 21
11	7.0	0	Vanuatu, Tafea	VII (Very strong)	27.7	February 12
11	7.0	0	Central Mid-Atlantic Ridge	I (Not felt)	10.0	March 14

== By month ==
=== January ===
January
- Strongest: 7.0 M_{w} Indonesia
- Deadliest: 6.7 M_{w} United States; 57 deaths
- Total fatalities: 66

Number by magnitude
- 8.0–8.9: 0
- 7.0–7.9: 1
- 6.0–6.9: 10

Date	Country and location	M_{w}	Depth (km)	MMI	Notes	Casualties	
Date	Country and location	M_{w}	Depth (km)	MMI	Notes	Dead	Injured
3	China, Qinghai	5.7	8.2	VII	Five people were injured and 56 houses were damaged in Gonghe.	-	5
4	Indonesia, Papua	6.0	11.0	VIII	-	-	-
10	Peru, Puno	6.9	596.0	III	-	-	-
11	Myanmar, Kachin	6.1	9.9	VII	-	-	-
16	United States, Pennsylvania	4.2	5.0	-	Slight damage occurred in Reading. Foreshock of the 4.6 event an hour later.	-	-
16	United States, Pennsylvania	4.6	5.0	VI	Some damage occurred in Reading.	-	-
17	United States, California	6.7	11.3	IX	1994 Northridge earthquake: This earthquake caused 57-60 deaths, 8,700 injuries, as well as between $13–50 billion in damages. Major damage occurred, especially in Los Angeles. It was one of the costliest natural disasters in American history.	57	8,700
17	United States, California	5.6	11.1	VII	It is an aftershock of the 1994 Northridge earthquake. Additional damage was caused.	-	-
19	Indonesia, Papua	6.8	23.2	VII	-	-	-
21	Indonesia, Lampung	6.0	89.9	V	-	-	-
21	Indonesia, Halmahera	7.0	19.9	IX	Nine people were killed, 300 others were injured, and 550 houses were damaged in Kau.	9	300
25	Northern Mid-Atlantic Ridge	6.3	29.5	I	-	-	-
29	United States, California	5.1	0.6	VI	It is an aftershock of the 1994 Northridge earthquake. Additional damage was caused in Northridge, and slight damage occurred in Sunland and Camarillo.	-	-

=== February ===
February
- Strongest: 7.0 M_{w} Vanuatu
- Deadliest: 6.9 M_{w} Indonesia; 207 deaths
- Total fatalities: 222

Number by magnitude
- 8.0–8.9: 0
- 7.0–7.9: 1
- 6.0–6.9: 18

Date	Country and location	M_{w}	Depth (km)	MMI	Notes	Casualties	
Date	Country and location	M_{w}	Depth (km)	MMI	Notes	Dead	Injured
1	India, Maharashtra	5.0	10.0	VII	Thirty-two houses were damaged in the village of Kasani.	-	-
3	United States, Wyoming	5.8	7.9	VII	Some damage occurred in Afton and Auburn and slight damage occurred in Fairview.	-	-
5	Uganda, Western	6.2	14.2	VII	At least nine people were killed, including two by a landslide, several were injured and most buildings were damaged in Fort Portal.	9	Several
11	Vanuatu, Tafea	6.9	205.7	V	-	-	-
12	South Pacific Ocean	6.7	15.0	I	-	-	-
12	Japan, Kagoshima	5.4	31.1	VI	One person was slightly injured in Ōkuchi.	-	1
12	Vanuatu, Tafea	7.0	27.7	VI	-	-	-
15	Indonesia, Lampung	6.9	23.1	X	1994 Liwa earthquake: At least 207 people were killed, more than 2,000 were injured, 75,000 were left homeless and extensive damage from landslides, mudslides and fires in Lampung Province. Much of the damage and loss of life occurred in the Liwa area.	207	2,000
23	Iran, South Khorasan	6.1	6.0	VIII	Six people were killed and many were injured in Sistan. It is a part of an earthquake sequence that would affect the area over the next few days.	6	Many
24	Iran, South Khorasan	6.3	9.6	VIII	-	-	-
25	Greece, Ionian Islands offshore	5.4	35.5	-	Slight damage and landslides occurred in Levkas.	-	-
26	Iran, South Khorasan	6.1	9.4	VII	About 100 houses were damaged in Sistan.	-	-

=== March ===
March
- Strongest: 7.6 M_{w} Fiji
- Deadliest: 5.4 M_{w} Haiti; 4 deaths
- Total fatalities: 6

Number by magnitude
- 8.0–8.9: 0
- 7.0–7.9: 2
- 6.0–6.9: 6

Date	Country and location	M_{w}	Depth (km)	MMI	Notes	Casualties	
Date	Country and location	M_{w}	Depth (km)	MMI	Notes	Dead	Injured
1	Iran, Fars	6.1	12.9	VII	At least two people were killed, fifty were injured and damage occurred in Firuzabad. Landslides also occurred, blocking roads.	2	50
2	Haiti, Nord-Ouest	5.4	59.2	V	Four people were killed and several homes were damaged in Saint-Louis-du-Nord.	4	-
3	Iran, Fars	4.9	33.0	IV	It was an aftershock of the 6.1 quake two days prior. Additional damage was caused in the region near the epicentre.	-	-
9	Fiji, Eastern offshore	7.6	562.5	IV	-	-	-
11	Japan, Shizuoka	5.5	10.0	VI	Slight damage occurred in the epicentral area due to landslides triggered by the quake.	-	-
14	Central Mid-Atlantic Ridge	6.0	10.0	I	Foreshock of the 7.0 quake eight seconds later.	-	-
14	Central Mid-Atlantic Ridge	7.0	10.0	I	-	-	-
14	Mexico, Chiapas	6.9	164.2	V	Slight damage occurred in Tuxtla Gutiérrez.	-	-
15	Nicaragua, Chinandega offshore	6.4	14.5	II	-	-	-
20	United States, California	5.2	12.4	VI	Minor damage occurred in Burbank and in the San Fernando area. It is an aftershock of the 6.7 quake on January 17.	-	-
30	Iran, Fars offshore	5.4	53.9	IV	30 people were injured in Firuzabad.	-	30
31	Fiji, Eastern offshore	6.5	579.8	I	-	-	-

=== April ===
April
- Strongest: 6.9 M_{w} Argentina
- Total fatalities: 0

Number by magnitude
- 8.0–8.9: 0
- 7.0–7.9: 0
- 6.0–6.9: 12

Date	Country and location	M_{w}	Depth (km)	MMI	Notes	Casualties	
Date	Country and location	M_{w}	Depth (km)	MMI	Notes	Dead	Injured
5	United States, Alaska offshore, Andreanof Islands	6.2	19.6	I	-	-	-
6	Vanuatu, Shefa offshore	6.2	17.4	V	-	-	-
8	Japan, Iwate offshore	6.4	13.3	I	Small tsunamis were observed, with heights of 22 cm (9 in) recorded in Ōfunato, and 10 cm (4 in) in Hachinohe and Ayukawahama.	-	-
10	Guatemala, San Marcos offshore	6.0	100.1	IV	-	-	-
10	Japan, Okinawa offshore	6.1	10.2	I	-	-	-
13	Indonesia, Papua	6.5	28.5	VI	-	-	-
18	Papua New Guinea, Bougainville offshore	6.7	26.3	VII	-	-	-
21	Papua New Guinea, Bougainville offshore	6.7	28.0	VI		-	-
23	Vanuatu, Torba offshore	6.2	10.8	VII	-	-	-
27	Tonga, Tongatapu offshore	6.3	28.1	I	-	-	-
27	Philippines, Mimaropa offshore	6.0	9.7	IV	-	-	-
29	Argentina, Santiago del Estero	6.9	561.5	I	-	-	-

=== May ===
May
- Strongest: 6.9 M_{w} Argentina
- Deadliest: 6.1 M_{w} Afghanistan; 160 deaths
- Total fatalities: 160

Number by magnitude
- 8.0–8.9: 0
- 7.0–7.9: 0
- 6.0–6.9: 16

Date	Country and location	M_{w}	Depth (km)	MMI	Notes	Casualties	
Date	Country and location	M_{w}	Depth (km)	MMI	Notes	Dead	Injured
1	Afghanistan, Balkh	6.1	18.5	VII	1994 Afghanistan Earthquake 160 people were killed and 330 were injured, mainly due to the shallow depth of the earthquake.	160	330
2	Indonesia, West Sumatra offshore	6.1	15.1	III	-	-	-
3	Trinidad and Tobago, Trinidad offshore	6.2	36.0	VI	-	-	-
4	Vanuatu, Shefa offshore	6.2	206.4	IV	-	-	-
10	Chile, Tarapacá	5.9	52.1	V	Some damage was caused in the Pan-American Highway and in Arica, due to rockslides that were triggered by the quake.	-	-
11	Argentina, Santiago del Estero	6.9	600.5	IV	-	-	-
11	Indonesia, West Sumatra offshore	6.5	20.5	V	Minor damage occurred in Padang.	-	-
11	Indonesia, West Sumatra offshore	6.1	28.0	V	Aftershock.	-	-
13	Philippines, Zamboanga Peninsula	5.9	33.0	V	Three people were injured and 43 houses were damaged in Pagadian, Cagayan de Oro, and Cotabato.	-	3
18	Russia, Kuril Islands offshore	6.2	26.0	I	-	-	-
23	Mexico, Guerrero	6.3	55.3	V	-	-	-
23	Taiwan, Hualien	6.2	19.9	V	-	-	-
23	Greece, Crete offshore	6.1	76.0	V	Some buildings suffered structural damage in Iraklion and Khania.	-	-
24	Taiwan, Hualien offshore	6.6	16.3	V	-	-	-
25	Indonesia, Papua	6.5	33.0	VII	Several buildings were damaged in Paniai Regency.	-	-
26	Morocco, Tanger-Tetouan-Al Hoceima offshore	6.0	9.7	VII	One person was injured and several buildings were damaged in Al Hoceima.	-	1
29	Myanmar, Magway	6.5	35.6	VI	-	-	-
31	Venezuela, Táchira	6.0	11.6	VII	One person was injured and some damage was caused in the epicentral area.	-	1

=== June ===
June
- Strongest: 8.2 M_{w} Bolivia
- Deadliest: 6.8 M_{w} Colombia; 795 deaths
- Total fatalities: 1,054

Number by magnitude
- 8.0–8.9: 1
- 7.0–7.9: 1
- 6.0–6.9: 15

Date	Country and location	M_{w}	Depth (km)	MMI	Notes	Casualties	
Date	Country and location	M_{w}	Depth (km)	MMI	Notes	Dead	Injured
2	Indonesia, Java offshore	7.8	18.4	V	1994 Java earthquake: Despite being located far offshore, this earthquake caused major destruction due to a destructive tsunami hitting the southern coast of Java and Bali. 250 people died and 27 were left missing. 423 others were injured and many people lost their homes.	250	423
3	Indonesia, Java offshore	6.6	25.9	I	Aftershocks of the 7.8 quake.	-	-
4	Indonesia, Java offshore	6.5	11.2	I	Aftershocks of the 7.8 quake.	-	-
5	Taiwan, Yilan offshore	6.4	11.4	VII	One person was killed in Chi-lung and two people were injured in Taipei and Yilan. Two-thirds of houses in Nan-ao were damaged. Surface cracks were also observed in the area. Landslides blocked a highway between Su-ao and Hua-lien.	1	2
5	Indonesia, Java offshore	6.1	25.9	I	Aftershock of the 7.8 earthquake on June 2.	-	-
6	Colombia, Cauca	6.8	12.1	IX	Deadliest event of 1994. 1994 Páez River earthquake: This event caused major damage in the departments of Cauca, Huila, Tolima, and Valle del Cauca. At least 795 people were killed (the death toll is claimed by some sources as high as 1,100). 13,000 were left homeless.	795	-
9	Bolivia, La Paz	8.2	631.3	VI	1994 Bolivia earthquake: It is the second largest deep-focus earthquake in recorded history, tied with the 2018 Fiji earthquake and behind the 2013 Sea of Okhotsk earthquake, the first earthquake from this part of South America believed to have been felt in North America, and is also believed to be the largest ever recorded in this general area. Due to the large depth, it was felt over a very wide area from Argentina to Canada. There were unconfirmed reports of at least five people killed in Peru, three in Arequipa and two in Cusco. Structural damage occurred in the cities of La Paz, Oruro, and Cochabamba in Bolivia, Brasília, Campo Grande, Porto Velho and Manaus in Brazil, Arica in Chile, and Tacna in Peru.	5	-
9	Bolivia, La Paz	6.1	650.0	I	Aftershock of the 8.2 earthquake an hour prior.	-	-
9	Philippines, Bicol offshore	6.2	75.9	V	-	-	-
11	Iran, Fars	4.8	18.4	V	Some damage occurred in Firuzabad. It is a foreshock of the 5.9 event on June 20.	-	-
13	Papua New Guinea, New Britain offshore	6.2	17.5	V	-	-	-
15	Indonesia, Java offshore	6.2	19.9	I	Aftershocks of the 7.8 quake on June 2.	-	-
15	Indonesia, Java offshore	6.1	28.8	I	Aftershocks of the 7.8 quake on June 2.	-	-
16	Peru, Puno	6.0	199.5	II	-	-	
18	New Zealand, Canterbury	6.8	13.6	VI	Some buildings suffered structural damage in Christchurch. Landslides blocked Highway 73 between Arthur's Pass and Christchurch.	-	-
19	New Zealand, Canterbury	6.0	10.0	VI	Minor additional damage was caused in the region near the epicentre. It is an aftershock of the 6.8 quake the day before.	-	-
20	Iran, Fars	5.9	8.6	VIII	Three people were killed, 100 were injured and 62 villages were damaged or destroyed in the Firuzabad-Shiraz area. Landslides blocked roads in the Zagros Mountains.	3	100
27	Chile, Easter Island offshore	6.1	10.0	I	-	-	-
30	Afghanistan, Badakhshan	6.3	226.6	IV	-	-	-

=== July ===
July
- Strongest: 7.3 M_{w} Russia
- Deadliest: 6.5 M_{w} Mexico; 2 deaths
- Total fatalities: 2

Number by magnitude
- 8.0–8.9: 0
- 7.0–7.9: 2
- 6.0–6.9: 6

Date	Country and location	M_{w}	Depth (km)	MMI	Notes	Casualties	
Date	Country and location	M_{w}	Depth (km)	MMI	Notes	Dead	Injured
4	Mexico, Oaxaca offshore	6.5	14.6	IV	Two people died when a stone wall collapsed in Oaxaca. Several others were also injured.	2	Several
13	Vanuatu, Malampa offshore	7.2	33.0	VII	-	-	-
13	Vanuatu, Malampa offshore	6.7	33.0	VI	Aftershock of the 7.2 event.	-	-
13	Indonesia, Barat Daya Islands offshore	6.5	158.8	V	-	-	-
21	Russia, Primorsky offshore	7.3	471.4	IV	-	-	-
22	Solomon Islands, Isabel offshore	6.0	19.2	VI	-	-	-
22	Vanuatu, Malampa offshore	6.4	20.5	V	Aftershock of the 7.2 event in July 13.	-	-
25	South Georgia and the South Sandwich Islands offshore	6.6	81.3	I	-	-	-

=== August ===
August
- Strongest: 6.6 M_{w} Russia; Two events
- Deadliest: 5.9 M_{w} Algeria; 171 deaths
- Total fatalities: 171

Number by magnitude
- 8.0–8.9: 0
- 7.0–7.9: 2
- 6.0–6.9: 13

Date	Country and location	M_{w}	Depth (km)	MMI	Notes	Casualties	
Date	Country and location	M_{w}	Depth (km)	MMI	Notes	Dead	Injured
4	Indonesia, Maluku offshore	6.2	33.0	I	-	-	-
5	Pacific-Antarctic Ridge	6.2	10.0	I	-	-	-
6	Australia, New South Wales	5.3	10.0	VII	Considerable damage occurred in Cessnock. Some structural damage occurred in Newcastle.	-	-
8	Myanmar, Sagaing	6.1	121.7	IV	-	-	-
10	Iran, Hormozgan	4.8	44.1	IV	Five houses were destroyed and between 30 and 60 percent others were damaged in Bastak.	-	-
14	Russia, Kuril Islands offshore	6.0	16.9	I	This is the first of a series of earthquakes affecting the area over the next several days.	-	-
18	Algeria, Mascara	5.9	10.7	VII	1994 Mascara earthquake: 171 people were killed and 645 others were injured. Major damage occurred in Mascara Province, where numerous villages were flattened. More than 10,000 were displaced.	171	645
18	Russia, Kuril Islands offshore	6.6	14.7	I	-	-	-
18	Russia, Kuril Islands offshore	6.3	19.0	I	-	-	-
19	Argentina, Santiago del Estero	6.5	563.6	I	-	-	-
20	Russia, Kuril Islands	6.2	24.4	I	-	-	-
21	Russia, Zabaykalsky	6.0	12.3	V	-	-	-
22	Solomon Islands, Santa Cruz Islands offshore	6.2	142.1	I	-	-	-
28	Russia, Kuril Islands offshore	6.6	18.6	IV	-	-	-
30	Indonesia, Banda Sea offshore	6.2	595.6	I	-	-	-
31	Russia, Kuril Islands offshore	6.2	76.0	V	-	-	-

=== September ===
September
- Strongest: 7.1 M_{w} United States
- Deadliest: 6.8 M_{w} Taiwan; 4 deaths
- Total fatalities: 7

Number by magnitude
- 8.0–8.9: 0
- 7.0–7.9: 1
- 6.0–6.9: 12

Date	Country and location	M_{w}	Depth (km)	MMI	Notes	Casualties	
Date	Country and location	M_{w}	Depth (km)	MMI	Notes	Dead	Injured
1	South Africa, Gauteng	2.7	5.0	III	Three people were killed and 13 others were injured at the Vaal Reefs gold mine.	3	13
1	United States, California offshore	7.1	10.0	VI	Slight damage occurred in Honeydew.	-	-
1	Macedonia, Demir Hisar	5.8	14.0	VII	Many people were injured and some damage occurred in Bitola.	-	Many
3	Vanuatu region offshore	6.3	33.0	I	-	-	-
12	Chile, Coquimbo offshore	6.0	40.0	V	-	-	-
12	United States, Nevada	6.1	14.0	VI	Slight damage was caused at Gardnerville, Minden, Smith, Virginia City, Garden Valley, Kirkwood and Markleeville.	-	-
12	Tonga, Niuas offshore	6.0	15.0	I	-	-	-
13	Japan, Kagoshima offshore	6.1	34.3	III	-	-	-
13	United States, Colorado	4.4	10.0	VI	Slight damage occurred in Norwood.	-	-
13	Colombia, Chocó	6.1	13.6	VII	-	-	-
15	South Georgia and the South Sandwich Islands offshore	6.0	10.0	I	-	-	-
16	Taiwan, Penghu offshore	6.8	13.0	VI	1994 Taiwan Strait earthquake: Four people were killed, 400 were injured, and damage to buildings occurred in Guangdong and Fujian provinces, China. Some damage also occurred in Penghu County, Taiwan.	4	400
23	Papua New Guinea, Bismarck Sea offshore	6.1	33.0	I	-	-	-
27	Colombia, Chocó offshore	6.2	33.0	I	-	-	-
28	Indonesia, Central Java offshore	6.6	637.5	I	-	-	-
28	Indonesia, Central Java offshore	6.0	628.2	I	Aftershock.	-	-

=== October ===
October
- Strongest: 8.3 M_{w} Russia
- Deadliest: 8.3 M_{w} Russia; 11 deaths
- Total fatalities: 12

Number by magnitude
- 8.0–8.9: 1
- 7.0–7.9: 1
- 6.0–6.9: 22

Date	Country and location	M_{w}	Depth (km)	MMI	Notes	Casualties	
Date	Country and location	M_{w}	Depth (km)	MMI	Notes	Dead	Injured
1	Vanuatu, Shefa offshore	6.5	16.6	V	-	-	-
1	Vanuatu, Shefa offshore	6.2	33.0	V	Aftershock.	-	-
4	Russia, Kuril Islands offshore	8.3	3.0	IX	1994 Kuril Islands earthquake: At least 10 people were killed and severe damage occurred in Iturup, Kunashir and Shikotan. In the Japanese island of Hokkaido, one person died of a heart attack, extensive damage and landslides occurred. A tsunami was generated, with maximum runup heights of 10.4 m (34 ft) in Dimitrova Bay. Many large aftershocks followed. These events have been plotted on the map but are not listed (unless it is of M 7.0+ or larger) to prevent cluttering.	10	1,742
7	China, Xinjiang	6.0	0.0	I	Probable underground nuclear explosion.	-	-
8	Indonesia, North Maluku offshore	6.8	16.6	VI	One person was killed, 52 others were injured and nearly 500 buildings, bridges, and piers were damaged on Obi Island.	1	52
9	Russia, Kuril Islands offshore	7.3	33.0	VI	Aftershock of the 8.3 event on October 4. Tsunami wave heights (peak-to-trough) from tide stations were 18 cm. at Hanasaki and 6 cm. at Kushiro, Hokkaido.	-	-
12	Philippines, Bicol offshore	6.4	15.7	VI	-	-	-
13	Indonesia, North Maluku offshore	6.4	10.7	VI	It is an aftershock of the 6.8 event in October 8. Additional damage was caused in Obi Island and 19 people were injured.	-	19
15	Papua New Guinea, East New Britain offshore	6.1	8.8	VI	-	-	-
16	Russia, Kuril Islands offshore	6.7	116.6	V	Not an aftershock of the 8.3 event on October 4.	-	-
20	Argentina, Neuquen	6.0	161.8	I	-	-	-
25	Afghanistan, Badakhshan	6.0	238.7	V	-	-	-
27	United States, Oregon offshore	6.3	20.0	I	-	-	-
27	Tonga offshore, south of the Fiji Islands	6.7	518.7	I	-	-	-
31	Indonesia, Aceh offshore	6.2	29.4	V	-	-	-

=== November ===
November
- Strongest: 7.1 M_{w} Philippines
- Deadliest: 7.1 M_{w} Philippines; 78 deaths
- Total fatalities: 78

Number by magnitude
- 8.0–8.9: 0
- 7.0–7.9: 1
- 6.0–6.9: 6

Date	Country and location	M_{w}	Depth (km)	MMI	Notes	Casualties	
Date	Country and location	M_{w}	Depth (km)	MMI	Notes	Dead	Injured
4	Brazil, Acre	6.1	591.3	I	-	-	-
5	Australia, Macquarie Island offshore	6.5	24.7	I	-	-	-
14	Philippines, Mimaropa offshore	7.1	31.5	VII	1994 Mindoro earthquake: 78 people were killed and 225 others were injured due to the combined effects of the earthquake itself and the subsequent tsunami. About 4,100 houses were damaged or destroyed in Mindoro. In Batangas, seven houses were destroyed. Liquefaction, sand boils and surface faulting occurred in the epicentral area.	78	250
15	Indonesia, Central Java offshore	6.5	560.5	I	-	-	-
15	Russia, Kuril Islands offshore	6.0	12.4	I	-	-	-
20	Indonesia, Papua offshore	6.3	16.0	VI	Twenty-eight people were injured and many buildings were damaged at Serui, Yapen.	-	28
20	Indonesia, Aceh	6.1	153.4	IV	-	-	-

=== December ===
December
- Strongest: 7.8 M_{w} Japan
- Deadliest: 7.8 M_{w} Japan; 3 deaths
- Total fatalities: 3

Number by magnitude
- 8.0–8.9: 0
- 7.0–7.9: 1
- 6.0–6.9: 11

Date	Country and location	M_{w}	Depth (km)	MMI	Notes	Casualties	
Date	Country and location	M_{w}	Depth (km)	MMI	Notes	Dead	Injured
3	Iran, Ilam	4.6	80.6	III	Buildings were damaged in Musian.	-	-
7	Argentina, Jujuy	6.0	235.0	I	-	-	-
10	Chile, Antofagasta offshore	6.0	36.6	VI	-	-	-
10	Peru, Tacna	6.3	148.2	V	-	-	-
14	Solomon Islands, Guadalcanal	6.1	16.3	V	-	-	-
15	New Zealand, Bay of Plenty offshore	6.5	33.0	V	Minor damage occurred in Ōpōtiki.	-	-
26	United States, California offshore	5.4	22.6	VII	Some damage occurred at Eureka and Samoa. Slight damage occurred at Arcata, Blue Lake, Fields Landing, Fortuna and McKinleyville. Total damage in Humboldt County was estimated at 2.1 million U.S. dollars.	-	-
27	New Zealand, Kermadec Islands offshore	6.4	212.4	IV	-	-	-
28	Japan, Iwate offshore	7.8	26.5	IX	1994 offshore Sanriku earthquake: Three people died and 200 were injured. A total of 6,229 buildings were affected, 48 of them were destroyed completely. Road damage and power outages were reported. Liquefaction occurred in the Hachinohe Port area. A 55 cm tsunami was observed in Miyako.	3	200
28	Japan, Iwate offshore	6.2	21.9	IV	Aftershock.	-	-
28	Japan, Iwate	6.4	10.5	I	Aftershock.	-	-
30	Turkey, Diyarbakir	4.7	10.0	VI	Two people were injured and some buildings were slightly damaged in Diyarbakir.	-	2
30	Northern Mariana Islands offshore	6.3	219.2	I	-	-	-
31	China, Guangdong offshore	5.3	33.0	V	360 people were injured in Guangdong and Guangxi provinces. 1,100 houses were also damaged in Guangxi.	-	360
31	Japan, Iwate offshore	6.0	43.0	IV	Aftershock.	-	-
