= Kuril Islands earthquake =

Kuril Islands earthquake may refer to:

- 1963 Kuril Islands earthquake
- 1975 Kuril Islands earthquake
- 1994 Kuril Islands earthquake
- 2006 Kuril Islands earthquake
- 2007 Kuril Islands earthquake
