= List of earthquakes in Fiji =

Map of earthquakes in Fiji 1900– (map data)

This is a list of earthquakes in Fiji which caused damage, casualties and/or a tsunami. As indicated below, magnitude is measured on the moment magnitude scale (M_{w}) or the surface wave magnitude scale (M_{s}) for older earthquakes. The present list is not exhaustive, and furthermore reliable and precise magnitude data is scarce for earthquakes that occurred before the development of modern measuring instruments.

== Background ==
Fiji lies in a complex tectonic setting along the boundary between the Australian plate and the Pacific plate. Southwards from Fiji, the Pacific plate is subducting beneath the Australian plate along the Tonga Trench forming the Tonga Ridge island arc system and the Lau Basin back-arc basin. To the southwest of Fiji the Australian plate is subducting beneath the Pacific plate forming the Vanuatu Ridge island arc system and the North Fiji back-arc basin. Hence, the region has undergone a complex process of plate convergence, subduction, and arc volcanism from the Middle Eocene to the Early Pliocene. Many of the larger islands, such as Viti Levu, are of volcanic origin. Volcanism still exists, and there are Holocene volcanoes in Fiji. The Fiji Platform lies in a zone bordered with active extension fault lines around which most of the shallow earthquakes were centered. These fault lines are the Fiji fracture zone (FFZ) to the north, the 176° Extension Zone (176°E EZ) to the west, and the Hunter fracture zone (HFZ) to the east.

The area between Fiji and New Zealand lies within arguably the most active deep-focus faulting zone on the planet, caused by the Pacific Plate subducting under the Australian Plate, Tonga Plate, and Kermadec Plate. This specific region experiences extremely frequent seismic activity, with earthquakes exceeding M_{w} 4.0 occurring almost daily. Earthquakes as large as M_{w} 8.2 are known to occur in this faulting zone. As a result, almost all of Fiji's earthquakes occur at depths exceeding 400 km (250 mi), and of the 210 ≥M_{w} 6.0 earthquakes that have been recorded near Fiji, only 66 struck less than 30 km (19 mi) beneath the surface, and only 15 are thought to have caused particularly strong shaking, according to the United States Geological Survey.

== History ==
A notable earthquake in Fiji's history was one that occurred off the coast of Suva in 1953, as well as the 1979 Taveuni earthquake. The Suva earthquake of 1953 measured M_{s} 6.8, and was located off the southeastern coast of Viti Levu. The earthquake collapsed a coral reef platform and caused a tsunami. The earthquake, combined with the tsunami, took the lives of eight people and caused severe structural damage in the capital. The latter earthquake occurred in 1979 measuring M_{s} 6.9. While this event did not claim any lives, it caused major damage to buildings and triggered a major landslide on the island of Qamea.

== List ==
Date	Region	Mag.	MMI	Deaths	Injuries	Comments	Ref(s)
2019-10-20	Kadavu	5.7 M_{ww}	V			Minor damage, landslides	
2018-09-06	Viti Levu	7.9 M_{ww}	IV				
2018-08-19	Viti Levu	8.2 M_{ww}	V			Small tsunami	
2017-01-03	Southwest of Kadavu	6.9 M_{ww}	IV			Small tsunami	
1979-11-16	Taveuni	6.9 M_{s}				Moderate damage	
1953-09-14	Suva	6.8 M_{s}	VIII	8		Tsunami	
1932-03-08	Lomaiviti	6.4 M_{w}	VII			Moderate damage, tsunami	
1919-10-03	Qamea	6.9 M_{s}	VIII			Moderate damage at Rabi Island	
1919-01-01	Lau	7.8 M_{w}				Minor tsunami hit Japan	
January 1884	Macuata		VII			Limited damage, tsunami, magnitude unknown	
1840-1850	Kadavu		VIII	40		Deaths from landslide, magnitude unknown	
Note: The inclusion criteria for adding events are based on WikiProject Earthquakes' notability guideline that was developed for stand alone articles. The principles described also apply to lists. In summary, only damaging, injurious, or deadly events should be recorded.

== See also ==
- Geography of Fiji
- List of volcanoes in Fiji
- Fiji Meteorological Service
