= 1970 Colombia earthquake =

- Location within Colombia
- UTC time: 1970-07-31 17:08:05
- ISC event: 794176
- USGS-ANSS: ComCat
- Local date: July 31, 1970
- Local time: 12:08:05
- Magnitude: 8.0 M_{w}
- Depth: 645 km (401 mi)
- Epicenter: 1.6°S 72.53°W
- Areas affected: Colombia
- Max. intensity: MMI IV (Light)
- Casualties: 1 dead, several injured

The 1970 Colombia earthquake occurred in Colombia on July 31.

== Details and aftermath ==
The shock killed one person and injured several others. Because it was a deep-focus earthquake, shaking occurred over an extensive area, including San Juan, Bogotá, Caracas, Buenos Aires, and São Paulo; it was felt as far north as Mexico City. Its depth forestalled more serious casualties, and there were no aftershocks.

The depth of the earthquake prompted scientists in South America to install seismometer networks focused on long-period earthquakes. Until the 1994 Bolivia earthquake, the 1970 Colombia earthquake was famous among seismologists as the largest deep earthquake.

== Analysis ==
A study completed by Dziewonski and Gilbert (1974) determined that the earthquake had featured isotropic compression, or an increase in density near the rupture point similar to an implosion; this was released to great controversy. They also claimed that the compression had been initiated 80 seconds before the actual earthquake's short-period shaking. Many studies have reached differing conclusions including a dearth of isotropic movement, and many scientists feel that resolution created errors in Dziewonski and Gilbert's findings. In 1997, Russakoff, Ekstrom, and Tromp reassessed their findings utilizing more advanced equipment that factored in shear wave splitting and coupling (the measure of how tightly locked two sides of a fault or plate are) and confirmed that there was very little isotropic compression.

== See also ==
- List of earthquakes in 1970
- List of earthquakes in Colombia
