= 2018 Fiji earthquakes =

2018 earthquake near the Fijian Islands

- Location within Fiji
- UTC time: 2018-08-19 00:19:40; 2018-09-06 15:49:18
- ISC event: 616641704; 612848327
- USGS-ANSS: ComCat; ComCat
- Local date: 19 August 2018; 7 September 2018
- Local time: 12:19:40; 03:49:18
- Magnitude: 8.2 M_{ww}; 7.9 M_{ww}
- Depth: 600 km (370 mi); 670.8 km (416.8 mi)
- Epicenter: 18.113°S 178.173°W; 18.474°S 179.350°E
- Type: Normal; Oblique-slip
- Total damage: None
- Max. intensity: MMI V (Moderate)
- Tsunami: 20 cm (0.66 ft)
- Aftershocks: 575 (As of 16 November 2018)
- Casualties: None

The 2018 Fiji earthquakes occurred on 19 August, at 00:19:40 UTC and on 6 September, 15:49 UTC. The epicenters were located close to the Fijian island Lakeba, and around 270 km from the small town of Levuka on Ovalau. The first earthquake registered a magnitude of M_{ww}8.2, and is the largest earthquake of 2018. It had a focal depth of 600 km, making it the second largest earthquake ever recorded at a depth greater than 300 km; a tie with the 1994 Bolivia earthquake, and behind the 2013 Okhotsk Sea earthquake. The initial earthquake was caused by a normal fault below the South Pacific Ocean. A M_{ww}7.9 event struck the islands again on 6 September at a depth of 670 km; this earthquake was a mainshock of its own. Both earthquakes may be considered a doublet event.

== Tectonic evolution ==
Initially, the Pacific plate and the Indo-Australian plate subducted, resulting in the heavier Pacific plate to move beneath the Indo-Australian plate. The subduction of the two plates resulted in the formation of a volcanic island arc called the Vityaz Arc. Twelve million years later, a similar event occurred. The Pacific plate converged towards the Indo-Australian plate at a north westward motion. Similarly, another volcanic island arc was formed near Fiji. The north westward motion continued to occur creating lots of stress on the plate boundary. Consequently, the Vityaz Arc was broken and the Fiji fracture zone was created. Recently, the movement of the plates created a subduction zone on the New Hebrides Trench. However, the Indo-Australian plate was pulled below the Pacific plate. The motion of these plates created a new volcanic island arc called the New Hebrides Arc. Eventually, the New Hebrides Arc and the Fiji islands started to diverge, which ultimately created the North Fiji Basin.

== Background ==
A notable earthquake in Fiji's history was one that occurred off the coast of Suva in 1953, as well as the 1979 Taveuni earthquake. The Suva earthquake of 1953 measured M_{s}6.8, and was located off the southeastern coast of Viti Levu. The earthquake collapsed a coral reef platform and caused a tsunami. The earthquake, combined with the tsunami, took the lives of eight people and severely damaged a lot of architecture. The latter earthquake occurred in 1979 measuring M_{s}6.9. While this event did not claim any lives, it caused major damage to buildings and triggered a major landslide on the island of Qamea.

== Earthquakes ==
Deep earthquakes are commonly defined as events occurring at a depth of 300 km or greater. These earthquakes occur within subducting slabs that are descending into the mantle. As these plates bend or flex, faults break out to accommodate the deformation and along with it, occasionally producing earthquakes. Normally, deep earthquakes such as this one will not have too many aftershocks, however there are cases in which a deep earthquake produces much more than it should as if it were a shallow earthquake like Tonga in 1994.

=== 19 August ===
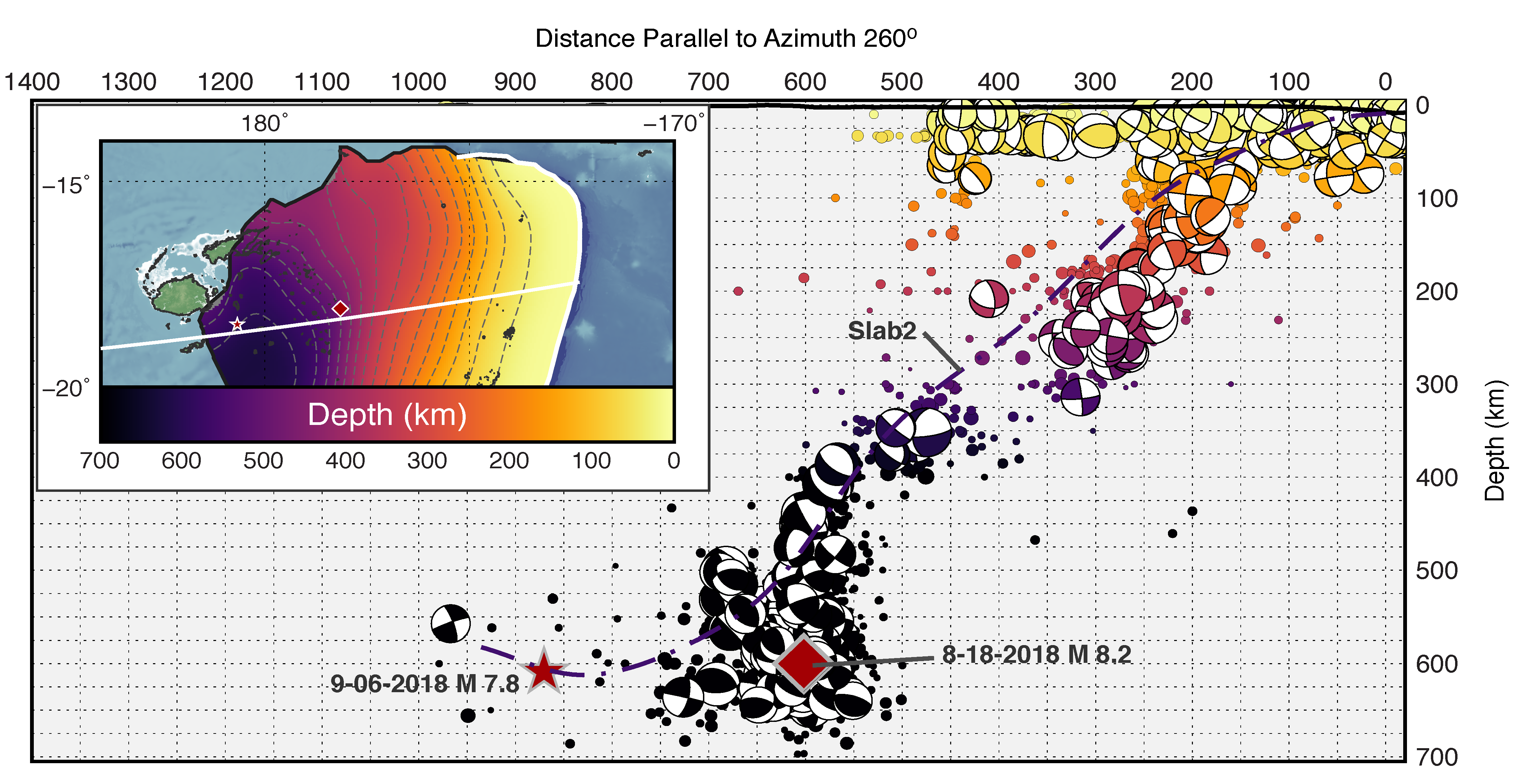
A cross-section diagram showing the Pacific slab under the Fijian Islands and the epicenters for both earthquakes. "Beach balls" are focal mechanism solutions marking the hypocenter locations of recorded earthquakes.

Initially reported as an 8.0 earthquake, it was later revised by the United States Geological Survey to an 8.2. Due to it being a deep-focus event, no damage was reported but it was widely felt. The undersea quake was too deep to trigger a large tsunami according to the US Pacific Tsunami Warning Center. Small tsunami waves up to 15 cm (0.49 ft) high were spotted along the coast, although it was too deep to generate more than a negligible tsunami. More than 250 aftershocks were recorded 34 days after the mainshock. The focal mechanism solution suggest the shock had a complex rupture process, and fast rupture velocity of 4.1 km/s. The rupture was observed along multiple faults in a mainly north-northeast-striking fault for a length of 102 to 152 km.

=== 6 September ===
Eighteen days after the 8.2 event, another earthquake struck closer to the island of Viti Levu. The M_{ww}7.9 earthquake was a downgrade from an initial magnitude of 8.1. The earthquake had a complex combination of strike-slip and dip-slip during rupture within the slab. It was an unusual event as this portion of the downgoing slab is rather aseismic; not capable of producing earthquakes. The depth of this event was slightly deeper than the first quake, and the rupture velocity was much slower, at 2.5 km/s. Coulomb stress transfer from the 8.2 quake may have triggered the 7.9 earthquake. However, stress from the first quake itself was not sufficient to generate the latter event. The M_{ww}7.9 event may have been dynamically triggered by the M_{ww}8.2 quake but the 18-day interval period was longer than usual as triggered quakes usually nucleate within a few hours to days.

== See also ==
- List of earthquakes in 2018
- List of earthquakes in Fiji
