= 1970 New Guinea earthquake =

- Location within Papua New Guinea
- UTC time: 1970-10-31 17:53:14
- ISC event: 791579
- USGS-ANSS: ComCat
- Local date: November 1, 1970
- Local time: 03:53:14 AEST
- Magnitude: 6.9 M_{w}
- Depth: 60 km (37 mi)
- Epicenter: 5°S 145.4°E
- Type: Strike-slip
- Areas affected: Papua New Guinea
- Total damage: US$1.75 million
- Max. intensity: MMI VIII (Severe)
- Tsunami: 3 m (10 ft)
- Casualties: 5–18 deaths 20 injured

On October 31 at 17:53 UTC (November 1 at 03:53 AEST) the island of New Guinea was shaken by an earthquake of magnitude 6.9 M_{w} that particularly affected the city of Madang on the north coast of Papua New Guinea. Causing between five and eighteen fatalities, it triggered landslides that ran down steep hills into poorly reinforced wooden huts. The area that experienced the most powerful intensity extended 20 kilometers (12 mi) out from the epicenter. Underwater landslides caused minor tsunami over about 100 km of coast and severed underwater cables in several places.

== Tectonic setting ==
The island of New Guinea lies within the complex zone of collision between the Australian plate and the Pacific plate. Within this overall setting, the active tectonics of northern Papua New Guinea is dominate by the effects of continuing collision between the Huon–Finisterre island arc terrane with the edge of the Australian continental margin. The overall shortening is concentrated into two zones of thrust faulting, the Ramu–Markham fault zone, which forms the southwestern boundary of the Huon–Finisterre terrane, and the Highlands Thrust Belt, which lies further southwest and deforms the Australian margin. The hanging wall of the Ramu–Markham thrust system is broken up by a series of strike-slip faults. The orientation of these faults, parallel to the direction of thrusting, suggests that they accommodate distortion of the Huon–Finisterre block. Most of the seismicity in northern Papua New Guinea is associated with the Ramu–Markham fault system, with a smaller number of earthquakes occurring on the strike-slip faults and on the Highlands Thrust Belt.

== Earthquake ==
The earthquake took place near Madang, approximately 350 miles (563 km) northwest of Port Moresby. Generally, it was on the northeast coast. The earthquake was the result of strike-slip faulting.

== Damage and casualties ==
Up to eighteen deaths and twenty injuries occurred. Felt throughout the entire island of New Guinea, it caused extensive damage in the city of Madang, where it killed three people. Several homes buckled and cracks appeared in streets. On the coast of the island, a cable connecting telephone units for Australia and Guam was cut. Initially, officials were worried of a tsunami risk though the earthquake did not produce any. This was due to a dramatic recession of water levels near the epicenter, followed by a rise that at one point measured 3 meters (10 ft). When a canoe was inverted by this change, three people were killed.

Its maximum intensity of VIII (Severe) was restricted to a zone 20 kilometers (12 mi) from the epicenter (including the epicenter). Up to 70 kilometers (43 mi) away from the epicenter, damage measuring intensity VII (Very strong) was recorded. Landslides caused most of the deaths (which the Catalog of Tsunamis in the Pacific, 1969–1982 lists as 15), which occurred in wooden huts damaged by the shock and crushed by rock. The number of huts damaged totaled more than 800. The city most damaged was Madang. Houses with poor earthquake engineering such as those with weakly reinforced frames performed poorly. Forty-five percent of the city's steel water tanks were beyond repair.

== See also ==
- List of earthquakes in 1970
- List of earthquakes in Papua New Guinea
