= 1994 Java earthquake =

Earthquake and tsunami affecting Indonesia

- Location within Java Location within Indonesia
- UTC time: 1994-06-02 18:17:34
- ISC event: 167105
- USGS-ANSS: ComCat
- Local date: June 3, 1994
- Local time: 01:17:37 WIB (Indonesia Western Standard Time)
- Magnitude: 7.8 M_{w}
- Depth: 18 km (11 mi)
- Epicenter: 10.51°S 112.87°E
- Areas affected: Indonesia
- Max. intensity: MMI V (Moderate)
- Casualties: 250 killed

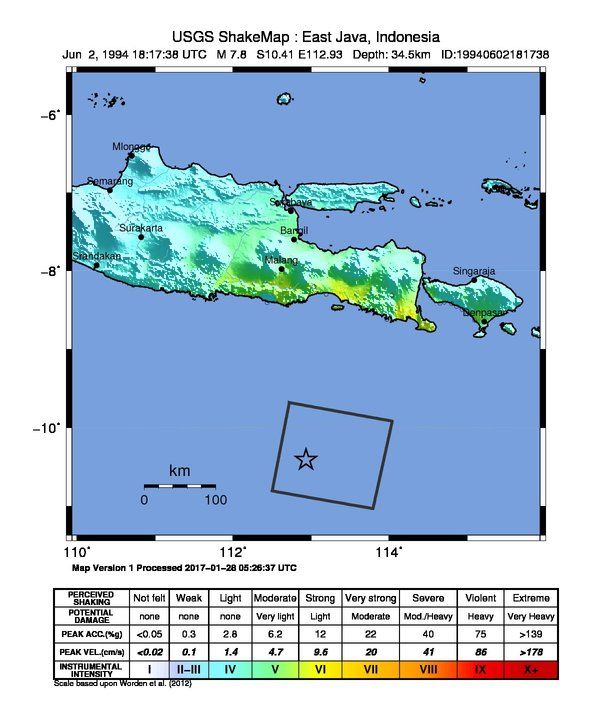

An earthquake occurred on June 3, 1994, at 01:17:37 local time (June 2, at 18:17:37 GMT) off the coast of Indonesia. The epicenter was off the eastern part of the southern Java coast, near the east end of the Java Trench.

== Earthquake ==
This earthquake occurred with a moment magnitude of 7.8 in a region which is characterized as having a weak seismic coupling. Earthquakes with slow rupture velocities are the most efficient tsunami generators, and this earthquake was classified as a tsunami earthquake.

== Tsunami ==
The tsunami reached Java and Bali, with runups up to 14 m (46 ft) on the east Java coast and up to 5 m (16 ft) on the southwestern Bali coast. More than 200 people were killed in the tsunami. The shock could be felt strongly across Bali, central and eastern Java, Lombok, and Sumbawa.

== See also ==
- G-Land
- List of earthquakes in 1994
- List of earthquakes in Indonesia
