= 1994 Páez River earthquake =

Earthquake in Colombia

- UTC time: 1994-06-06 20:47:41
- ISC event: 167996
- USGS-ANSS: ComCat
- Local date: June 6, 1994
- Local time: 15:47:41 COT
- Magnitude: 6.8 M_{w}
- Depth: 12 km
- Epicenter: 2.917°N 76.057°W
- Areas affected: Colombia
- Max. intensity: MMI IX (Violent)
- Tsunami: No
- Casualties: at least 1,100 dead

The 1994 Páez River earthquake occurred on June 6 with a moment magnitude of 6.8 at a depth of 12 km (7.5 mi). The event, which is also known as the Páez River disaster, included subsequent landslides and mudslides that destroyed much of the Páez municipality, located on the foothills of the Central Ranges of the Andes in Cauca in south-western Colombia. It was estimated that 1,100 people, mostly from the Páez, were killed in some 15 settlements on the Páez River basin, Cauca and Huila departments of which the eponymous municipality of Páez suffered 50% of the death toll. In response to the disaster, the government created the Nasa Kiwe Corporation to bring relief to the area, and begin the reconstruction of the affected areas.

== See also ==
- List of earthquakes in 1994
- List of earthquakes in Colombia

== References and notes ==
1. . Sismo del 6 de junio de 1994 El sismo de Paez de 1994. "(...)A causa del sismo se registraron 20 personas muertas y algunos heridos, cifra nada comparable con la cantidad de víctimas que dejaron las avalanchas, calculada en más de 300 muertos y 500 desaparecidos."
2. . Detailed descriptions and photographs of the events, the outcomes, the handling of the emergency and later developments and social consequences can be seen in Nasa kive the government corporation for the reconstruction of the Páez River basin.
3. . A detailed report with complementary information about this particular disaster and several others that took place around the same time in the Andean countries can be obtained in a special issue of the journal Desastres y Sociedad, published by La Red de Estudios Sociales en Prevención de Desastres en América Latina in 1995.
