= List of earthquakes in 1970 =

Earthquakes in 1970
Approximate epicenters of the earthquakes in 1970
- 4.0–5.9 magnitude
- 6.0–6.9 magnitude
- 7.0–7.9 magnitude
- 8.0+ magnitude
- Strongest: Colombia, Amazonas Department (Magnitude 8.0) July 31
- Deadliest: Peru, offshore northern Peru (Magnitude 7.9) May 31 66,794 deaths
- Total fatalities: 78,365

Number by magnitude
- 9.0+: 0

This is a list of earthquakes in 1970. Only magnitude 6.0 or greater earthquakes appear on the list. Lower magnitude events are included if they have caused death, injury or damage. Events which occurred in remote areas will be excluded from the list as they wouldn't have generated significant media interest. All dates are listed according to UTC time. Maximum intensities are indicated on the Mercalli intensity scale and are sourced from United States Geological Survey (USGS) ShakeMap data. In terms of magnitude 7.0+ events this year produced 17 which is average for any year. The death toll however was much higher than preceding years. Three events in particular contributed to this. Firstly, in January, China suffered from an event which caused 10,000 deaths. Then at the end of March, Turkey had a magnitude 6.9 earthquake resulting in over 1,000 deaths. Finally, Peru had its worst disaster on May 31 when an earthquake of magnitude 7.9 helped to cause nearly 67,000 deaths.

== Overall ==
=== By death toll ===
Rank	Death toll	Magnitude	Location	MMI	Depth (km)	Date
1	66,794	7.9	Peru, offshore northern Peru	X (Extreme)	45.0	May 31
2	10,000	7.1	China, Yunnan Province	X (Extreme)	11.3	January 4
3	1,086	6.9	Turkey, Kutahya Province	X (Extreme)	25.0	March 28
4	220	6.7	Iran, Golestan Province	VIII (Severe)	15.0	July 30
5	101	6.7	Soviet Union, Dagestan, Russia	VII (Very strong)	15.0	May 14
6	82	7.2	Peru, Tumbes Region	X (Extreme)	25.0	December 10
7	26	5.4	India, Gujarat	( )	3.0	March 23
8	18	6.9	Australia, Madang Province, Papua and New Guinea	VIII (Severe)	60.0	October 31
9	15	7.4	Philippines, Luzon	VIII (Severe)	25.0	April 7
10	12	5.9	Peru, Huanuco Region	IX (Violent)	39.8	February 14

- Note: At least 10 casualties

=== By magnitude ===
Rank	Magnitude	Death toll	Location	MMI	Depth (km)	Date
1	8.0	1	Colombia, Amazonas Department	IV (Light)	644.8	July 31
2	7.9	66,794	Peru, offshore northern Peru	X (Extreme)	45.0	May 31
= 3	7.4	15	Philippines, Luzon	VIII (Severe)	25.0	April 7
= 3	7.4	0	Canada, south of Haida Gwaii	( )	18.3	June 24
= 4	7.3	0	Mexico, off the coast of Chiapas	VIII (Severe)	35.0	April 29
= 4	7.3	0	Australia, south of Macquarie Island	( )	15.0	June 11
= 4	7.3	0	Soviet Union, Sea of Okhotsk, Russia	( )	647.6	August 30
= 5	7.2	0	Philippines, off the southeast coast of Mindanao	VII (Very strong)	40.0	January 10
= 5	7.2	0	Argentina, east of Tierra del Fuego Province, Argentina	VII (Very strong)	10.0	June 15
= 5	7.2	82	Peru, Tumbes Region	X (Extreme)	25.0	December 10
= 6	7.1	10,000	China, Yunnan Province	X (Extreme)	11.3	January 4
= 6	7.1	0	United States, Andreanof Islands, Alaska	III (Weak)	164.1	February 28
= 6	7.1	0	Japan, Bonin Islands	( )	390.0	May 27
= 7	7.0	0	Chile, Magallanes Region	VII (Very strong)	15.0	June 14
= 7	7.0	0	Japan, off the east coast of Kyushu	VIII (Severe)	45.0	July 25
= 7	7.0	0	Burma, Sagaing Region	VII (Very strong)	76.1	July 29
= 7	7.0	0	United Kingdom, Solomon Islands	( )	30.0	December 2

- Note: At least 7.0 magnitude

== Notable events ==
=== January ===
January
- Strongest: 7.2 M_{w} Philippines
- Deadliest: 7.1 M_{w} China; 10,000 deaths
- Total fatalities: 10,000

Number by magnitude
- 8.0–8.9: 0
- 7.0–7.9: 2
- 6.0–6.9: 7

Date	Country and location	M_{w}	Depth (km)	MMI	Notes	Casualties	
Date	Country and location	M_{w}	Depth (km)	MMI	Notes	Dead	Injured
4	China, Yunnan Province	7.1	11.3	X	The 1970 Tonghai earthquake caused major destruction across the area. 10,000 people were killed. Many homes were destroyed or damaged.	10,000	
6	Australia, D'Entrecasteaux Islands, Papua and New Guinea	6.3	15.0	VI			
8	New Zealand, south of Kermadec Islands	6.8	199.4				
10	Philippines, off the southeast coast of Mindanao	7.2	40.0	VII			
11	Philippines, off the southeast coast of Mindanao	6.0	45.0	V	Aftershock.		
14	Indonesia, off the west coast of Timor	6.0	25.0	VI			
20	Fiji, south of	6.8	70.0				
20	Japan, Hokkaido	6.4	35.1	VI			
26	United Kingdom, Santa Cruz Islands, Solomon Islands	6.5	35.0				

=== February ===
February
- Strongest: 7.1 M_{w} United States
- Deadliest: 5.9 M_{w} Peru; 12 deaths
- Total fatalities: 15

Number by magnitude
- 8.0–8.9: 0
- 7.0–7.9: 1
- 6.0–6.9: 7
- 5.0–5.9: 1

Date	Country and location	M_{w}	Depth (km)	MMI	Notes	Casualties	
Date	Country and location	M_{w}	Depth (km)	MMI	Notes	Dead	Injured
2	Soviet Union, Kuril Islands, Russia	6.0	29.7				
5	Philippines, off the west coast of Tablas Island	6.7	15.0	IX	3 people were killed and at least 51 were injured. Some damage was caused.	3	51+
6	Philippines, off the west coast of Tablas Island	6.0	25.0	VI	Aftershock.		
6	China, Yunnan Province	6.1	10.0	VII			
13	Indonesia, Java Sea	6.5	622.8	II			
14	Peru, Huanuco Region	5.9	39.8	IX	12 people were killed and many homes were destroyed.	12	
25	Taiwan, off the east coast	6.1	30.0	IV			
26	Soviet Union, Kuril Islands, Russia	6.1	26.2				
28	United States, Andreanof Islands, Alaska	7.1	164.1	III			

=== March ===
March
- Strongest: 6.9 M_{w} Turkey
- Deadliest: 6.9 M_{w} Turkey; 1,086 deaths
- Total fatalities: 1,117

Number by magnitude
- 8.0–8.9: 0
- 7.0–7.9: 0
- 6.0–6.9: 11
- 5.0–5.9: 1

Date	Country and location	M_{w}	Depth (km)	MMI	Notes	Casualties	
Date	Country and location	M_{w}	Depth (km)	MMI	Notes	Dead	Injured
4	Philippines, off the east coast of Mindanao	6.1	35.0	V			
9	New Hebrides, Vanuatu	6.6	30.0	V			
10	Soviet Union, Kuril Islands, Russia	6.2	54.5				
11	United States, Kodiak Island, Alaska	6.0	39.0	V	Minor damage was caused.		
14	Iran, West Azerbaijan Province	5.4	17.1	IV	5 people were killed and many homes were destroyed.	5	
15	Argentina, San Juan Province, Argentina	6.0	116.7	IV			
23	India, Gujarat	5.4	20.1	VII	26 people were killed and 200 injuries. Some damage was caused.	26	200
24	Australia, Western Australia	6.0	10.0				
27	Indonesia, Makassar Strait	6.7	25.0	VI			
28	Australia, off the west coast of Bougainville Island, Papua New Guinea	6.0	60.0	V			
28	Turkey, Kutahya Province	6.9	25.0	X	1,086 people died and 1,174 were injured in the 1970 Gediz earthquake. 8,229 homes were damaged or destroyed. Costs were $55 million (1970 rate).	1,086	1,174
29	New Hebrides, Vanuatu	6.6	237.2	IV			
30	Philippines, off the east coast of Mindanao	6.8	50.0	VII			

=== April ===
April
- Strongest: 7.4 M_{w} Philippines
- Deadliest: 7.4 M_{w} Philippines; 15 deaths
- Total fatalities: 16+

Number by magnitude
- 8.0–8.9: 0
- 7.0–7.9: 2
- 6.0–6.9: 10
- 5.0–5.9: 1

Date	Country and location	M_{w}	Depth (km)	MMI	Notes	Casualties	
Date	Country and location	M_{w}	Depth (km)	MMI	Notes	Dead	Injured
7	Philippines, Luzon	7.4	25.0	VIII	15 people were killed and over 200 were injured. Some damage was caused. A tsunami was triggered resulting in some damage.	15	200
8	Greece, Gulf of Corinth	6.3	20.0	VII			
8	Philippines, Luzon	6.5	25.0	VI	Aftershock.		
12	Philippines, off the east coast of Luzon	6.9	22.5	IX	Aftershock.		
15	Philippines, off the east coast of Luzon	6.2	25.0	V	Aftershock.		
16	United States, Gulf of Alaska	6.7	15.0	IV			
19	Turkey, Kutahya Province	6.1	18.4	VII	Aftershock of March 28 event.		
19	Turkey, Kutahya Province	6.0	17.5	VII	Aftershock of March 28 event.		
20	New Hebrides, Vanuatu	6.6	238.7				
23	Turkey, Manisa Province	5.7	20.0	VIII	At least 1 person was killed and 43 were injured. 150 homes were damaged or destroyed.	1+	43
29	Mexico, off the coast of Chiapas	6.6	35.0	V	Foreshock.		
29	Mexico, off the coast of Chiapas	7.3	35.0	VIII			
30	Mexico, off the coast of Chiapas	6.6	35.0	V	Aftershock.		

=== May ===
May
- Strongest: 7.9 M_{w} Peru
- Deadliest: 7.9 M_{w} Peru; 66,794 deaths
- Total fatalities: 66,895

Number by magnitude
- 8.0–8.9: 0
- 7.0–7.9: 2
- 6.0–6.9: 5
- 5.0–5.9: 0

Date	Country and location	M_{w}	Depth (km)	MMI	Notes	Casualties	
Date	Country and location	M_{w}	Depth (km)	MMI	Notes	Dead	Injured
9	Australia, East New Britain Province, Papua and New Guinea	6.2	180.0	IV			
14	Soviet Union, Dagestan, Russia	6.1	12.5	VII	Some homes were damaged and some were destroyed. Foreshock.		
14	Soviet Union, Dagestan, Russia	6.7	15.0	VIII	The 1970 Dagestan earthquake killed at least 31 people and injured 1,000 others. Many homes were damaged or destroyed.	31	1,000+
15	Mongolia, Uvs Province	6.3	7.0	VIII			
27	Japan, Bonin Islands	7.1	390.0				
31	Peru, off the north coast	7.9	45.0	X	Deadliest event of 1970. The 1970 Ancash earthquake was the worst disaster in Peruvian history. 66,794 people died and 50,000 were injured. A large part of the destruction was caused by an avalanche. Many homes were damaged or destroyed. Costs were $530 million (1970 rate).	66,794	50,000
31	Peru, off the north coast	6.1	50.6	VI	Aftershock.		

=== June ===
June
- Strongest: 7.4 M_{w} Canada
- Total fatalities: 0

Number by magnitude
- 8.0–8.9: 0
- 7.0–7.9: 4
- 6.0–6.9: 9

Date	Country and location	M_{w}	Depth (km)	MMI	Notes	Casualties	
Date	Country and location	M_{w}	Depth (km)	MMI	Notes	Dead	Injured
1	Peru, off the north coast	6.2	45.4	V	Aftershock of May 31 event.		
4	Peru, off the north coast	6.4	54.9	VI	Aftershock of May 31 event.		
5	Soviet Union, Issyk-Kul Region, Kyrgyzstan	6.3	15.0	VIII	5,000 homes were destroyed.		
11	Chile, Antofagasta Region	6.6	110.6	VI			
11	Australia, south of Macquarie Island	7.3	15.0				
14	Chile, Magallanes Region	7.0	15.0	VII			
15	Argentina, Tierra del Fuego Province, Argentina	7.2	10.0	VII			
17	Peru, Arequipa Region	6.0	108.6	IV			
19	Chile, off the coast of Antofagasta Region	6.5	60.0	VI			
22	Soviet Union, Kuril Islands, Russia	6.0	30.3				
24	Canada, south of Haida Gwaii	7.4	18.3				
25	United Kingdom, Santa Isabel Island, Solomon Islands	6.2	45.0	VI			
28	Indonesia, Savu Sea	6.6	85.8	VI			

=== July ===
July
- Strongest: 8.0 M_{w} Colombia
- Deadliest: 6.7 M_{w} Iran; 220 deaths
- Total fatalities: 222

Number by magnitude
- 8.0–8.9: 1
- 7.0–7.9: 2
- 6.0–6.9: 10

Date	Country and location	M_{w}	Depth (km)	MMI	Notes	Casualties	
Date	Country and location	M_{w}	Depth (km)	MMI	Notes	Dead	Injured
2	Peru, off the central coast	6.0	52.0	V	Aftershock of May 31 event.		
2	Turkey, Kayseri Province	4.9	27.0		1 death was caused. 150 homes were damaged or destroyed.	1	
8	United States, United States Virgin Islands	6.1	143.0	IV			
16	Tonga	6.1	20.0				
17	Tonga	6.3	35.0				
19	Australia, northeast of New Britain, Papua and New Guinea	6.2	20.0	VI			
25	Japan, off the east coast of Kyushu	7.0	45.0	VIII	13 people were injured and some damage was caused.		13
26	Japan, off the east coast of Kyushu	6.2	45.0	V	Aftershock.		
27	New Zealand, North Island	6.3	95.0	V			
29	China, southern Xinjiang Province	6.0	14.7	VII			
29	Burma, Sagaing Region	7.0	79.1	VII			
30	Iran, Golestan Province	6.7	15.0	VIII	220 people were killed and another 220 were injured. 2,000 homes were damaged or destroyed. Costs were around $8 million (1970 rate).	220	220
30	Gulf of Aden	6.6	15.0				
31	Colombia, Amazonas Department	8.0	644.8	IV	Largest event of 1970. The 1970 Colombia earthquake left 1 person dead and at least 51 injured. Damage was caused in the immediate area. Due to the depth and size of the event the shock was felt several thousand miles away.	1	51+

=== August ===
August
- Strongest: 7.3 M_{w} Soviet Union, Russia
- Total fatalities: 0

Number by magnitude
- 8.0–8.9: 0
- 7.0–7.9: 1
- 6.0–6.9: 8

Date	Country and location	M_{w}	Depth (km)	MMI	Notes	Casualties	
Date	Country and location	M_{w}	Depth (km)	MMI	Notes	Dead	Injured
10	New Hebrides, Vanuatu	6.4	45.0		Foreshock.		
11	New Hebrides, Vanuatu	6.9	45.0	VII			
12	New Hebrides, Vanuatu	6.0	45.0		Aftershock.		
12	New Hebrides, Vanuatu	6.5	45.0	V	Aftershock.		
12	Nicaragua, off the west coast of	6.5	60.0	VI			
18	United States, southern Alaska	6.0	25.0	VII			
27	Tonga	6.0	10.0				
28	Australia, off the southeast coast of New Ireland (island), Papua and New Guinea	6.5	60.0	VI			
30	Soviet Union, Sea of Okhotsk, Russia	7.3	647.6				

=== September ===
September
- Strongest: 6.6 M_{w} 2 events
- Total fatalities: 0

Number by magnitude
- 8.0–8.9: 0
- 7.0–7.9: 0
- 6.0–6.9: 10
- 5.0–5.9: 1

Date	Country and location	M_{w}	Depth (km)	MMI	Notes	Casualties	
Date	Country and location	M_{w}	Depth (km)	MMI	Notes	Dead	Injured
1	United States, Northern Mariana Islands	6.6	25.0				
3	New Hebrides, Vanuatu	6.1	25.0	V			
5	Soviet Union, Sea of Okhotsk, Russia	6.5	580.6		Aftershock of August 30 event.		
7	Yugoslavia, Sibenik-Knin County, Croatia	5.5	5.0	VII	8 people were injured and some damage was caused.		8
14	Japan, off the east coast of Honshu	6.4	48.6	V			
16	United States, off the south coast of Guam	6.0	45.0				
23	Australia, off the west coast of Bougainville Island, Papua and New Guinea	6.4	35.0	V			
23	Australia, off the west coast of Bougainville Island, Papua and New Guinea	6.1	35.0	IV			
26	Colombia, off the coast of Choco Department	6.6	15.0	rowspan="2"| 2 people were injured. 104 homes were destroyed with costs reaching $400,000 (1970 rate). Doublet earthquake.		2	
27	Colombia, off the coast of Choco Department	6.5	15.0	VII			
30	Philippines, Batan Islands	6.0	30.0	VII	2 homes collapsed and many sustained damage.		

=== October ===
October
- Strongest: 6.9 M_{w} Australia, Papua and New Guinea
- Deadliest: 6.9 M_{w} Australia, Papua and New Guinea; 18 deaths
- Total fatalities: 18

Number by magnitude
- 8.0–8.9: 0
- 7.0–7.9: 0
- 6.0–6.9: 6

Date	Country and location	M_{w}	Depth (km)	MMI	Notes	Casualties	
Date	Country and location	M_{w}	Depth (km)	MMI	Notes	Dead	Injured
2	Australia, off the southwest coast of Bougainville Island, Papua and New Guinea	6.0	35.0	V			
11	New Zealand, Kermadec Islands	6.5	25.0				
14	Soviet Union, Kuril Islands, Russia	6.4	32.5				
14	Soviet Union, Kuril Islands, Russia	6.1	35.0	V	Aftershock.		
16	Japan, Akita Prefecture, Honshu	6.2	15.0	VII			
31	Australia, Madang Province, Papua and New Guinea	6.9	60.0	VIII	18 people were killed and 20 injured in the 1970 New Guinea earthquake. 3 of the deaths were from a canoe capsizing. Damage costs reached $1.75 million with 800 homes being damaged or destroyed.	18	20

=== November ===
November
- Strongest: 6.7 M_{w} Indonesia
- Total fatalities: 0

Number by magnitude
- 8.0–8.9: 0
- 7.0–7.9: 0
- 6.0–6.9: 8

Date	Country and location	M_{w}	Depth (km)	MMI	Notes	Casualties	
Date	Country and location	M_{w}	Depth (km)	MMI	Notes	Dead	Injured
8	Philippines, off the east coast of Mindanao	6.1	40.0	V			
8	Indonesia, Papua (province)	6.7	35.0	VIII			
12	Australia, Madang Province, Papua and New Guinea	6.3	15.0	VII	Aftershock of October 31 event.		
13	Philippines, Masbate Island	6.5	13.5	VII			
14	Taiwan, off the east coast of	6.2	29.5	VI			
28	Chile, Tarapaca Region	6.0	45.2	VI			
28	Australia, East Sepik Province, Papua and New Guinea	6.0	125.0	IV			

=== December ===
December
- Strongest: 7.2 M_{w} Peru
- Deadliest: 7.2 M_{w} Peru; 82 deaths
- Total fatalities: 82

Number by magnitude
- 8.0–8.9: 0
- 7.0–7.9: 2
- 6.0–6.9: 7

Date	Country and location	M_{w}	Depth (km)	MMI	Notes	Casualties	
Date	Country and location	M_{w}	Depth (km)	MMI	Notes	Dead	Injured
2	United Kingdom, Solomon Islands	7.0	30.0				
4	Chile, Antofagasta Region	6.5	39.2	VI			
6	Japan, off the south coast of Hokkaido	6.5	40.0	V			
7	Japan, Izu Islands	6.7	184.6				
8	Chile, Coquimbo Region	6.5	50.7	VII			
10	Peru, Tumbes Region	7.2	25.0	X	The 1970 Peru-Ecuador earthquake caused 82 deaths and 350 injuries. Damage costs were $6 million (1970 rate).	82	350
19	Indonesia, off the west coast of Sumatra	6.2	42.3	IV			
28	Australia, southeast of New Ireland (island), Papua and New Guinea	6.6	55.0				
29	United Kingdom, Solomon Islands	6.7	30.0	VII			
