= 1994 Taiwan Strait earthquake =

Earthquake in East Asia

- Location within Taiwan Location within China
- UTC time: 1994-09-16 06:20:20
- ISC event: 156328
- USGS-ANSS: ComCat
- Local date: 16 September 1994
- Local time: 14:20:20
- Magnitude: 6.8 M_{w}
- Depth: 13 km (8.1 mi)
- Epicenter: 22.528°N 118.711°E
- Areas affected: Taiwan, China, British Hong Kong
- Max. intensity: MMI VI (Strong)
- Casualties: 4 dead

The 1994 Taiwan Strait earthquake occurred on 16 September 1994, at 14:20 local time (06:20 UTC) in the southern Taiwan Strait. The magnitude of this earthquake was given as M_{w} 6.8 by the USGS and M_{s} 7.3 by Fujian Seismological Bureau. The epicenter was located about 150 to 180 km from the coast of the border of Guangdong and Fujian, and about 150 km southwest of Taiwan.

== Geology ==
The earthquake occurred in the transition zone from the continental margin to the continent-ocean transitional crust. In this region, the depth of the Moho interface decreases from about 28 km in the west to about 20 km in the east. The transition between continental and oceanic crusts is reflected in the variation of the depth of the Moho interface.

There are several NW trending faults in the Taiwan Strait, including the Ningde-Sandiaojiao fault zone (宁德-三貂角断裂带), the Taichung-Jinjiang fault zone (台中-晋江断裂带), and the Bashi fault zone (巴士断裂带). In addition, there are several faults in the NE direction, including the Binhai Fault Zone (or the Littoral Fault Zone) (滨海断裂带). Some sources suggested that the earthquake was related to the activity of the Bashi fault system. However, there are still disputes over whether the fault plane should have been in the NW or the NE direction.

A paper of Fujian Seismological Bureau showed that the earthquake was caused by left-lateral strike slip of a normal fault.

The earthquake had a maximum slip of 14 m in the hypocentral region. The source duration was about 4 s, which is short for an event with magnitude about M_{w} 6.7. From the slip amplitude and the source duration, it was suggested that this earthquake began as a breaking of a strong asperity with low dynamic friction, had high stress drop, and was stopped by large friction around the asperity.

== Damage ==
The intensities recorded in Taiwan were shindo 4 in Penghu, 3 in Kaohsiung, and 2 in Taipei. The earthquake could be felt in Hong Kong and Macau, and the intensity recorded in Hong Kong was MM V to VI. This earthquake was felt strongly in Guangdong and Fujian, with building damage and collapse reported. Three deaths were reported in Guangdong and one in Fujian. Cities as north as Hefei and as west as Nanning were included in the felt range.

== Tsunami ==
A tsunami was triggered by the earthquake. The heights of the tsunami were recorded as 38 cm in Penghu, Taiwan and 18 cm in Dongshan, Fujian, China.

== See also ==
- List of earthquakes in 1994
- List of earthquakes in China
- List of earthquakes in Taiwan
