= 1970 Peru–Ecuador earthquake =

- Location within Peru
- UTC time: 1970-12-10 04:34:41
- ISC event: 789028
- USGS-ANSS: ComCat
- Local date: December 9, 1970
- Local time: 23:34:41
- Magnitude: 7.1 M_{w}
- Depth: 25 km (16 mi)
- Epicenter: 3.99°S 80.72°W
- Areas affected: Peru and Ecuador
- Max. intensity: MMI IX (Violent)
- Casualties: 82 (50 in Ecuador, 32 in Peru)

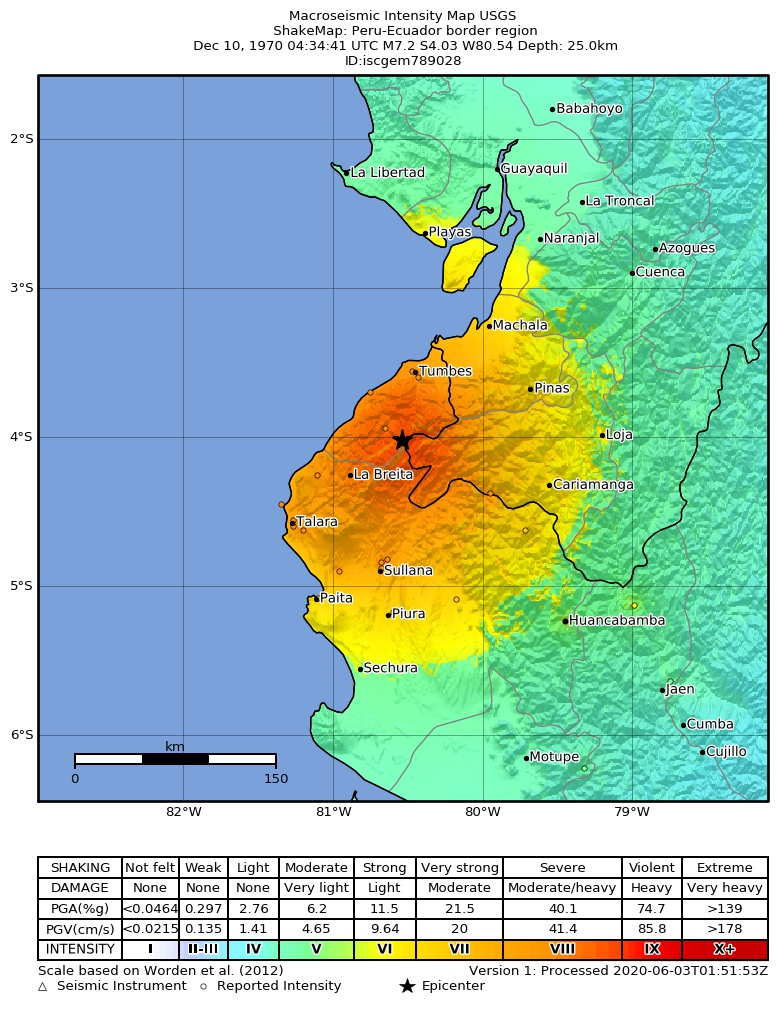
Shakemap of the 1970 Peru–Ecuador earthquake

The 1970 Peru–Ecuador earthquake occurred on December 9 at 23:34 local time. The epicenter was located in northwestern Peru, between Piura and Tumbes, near the Peru–Ecuador border. This earthquake had a magnitude of M_{w} 7.1, or M_{s} 7.1. About 81 people were reported dead in Peru and in Ecuador together. Liquefaction was observed. The maximum Mercalli Intensity reached IX (Violent). Fractures in constructions were reported in the urban area of Talara. This was a shallow earthquake, and it was thought to occur in the plate above the plate boundary.

== See also ==
- List of earthquakes in 1970
- List of earthquakes in Ecuador
- List of earthquakes in Peru
