= 1994 Mindoro earthquake =

Earthquake in the Philippines

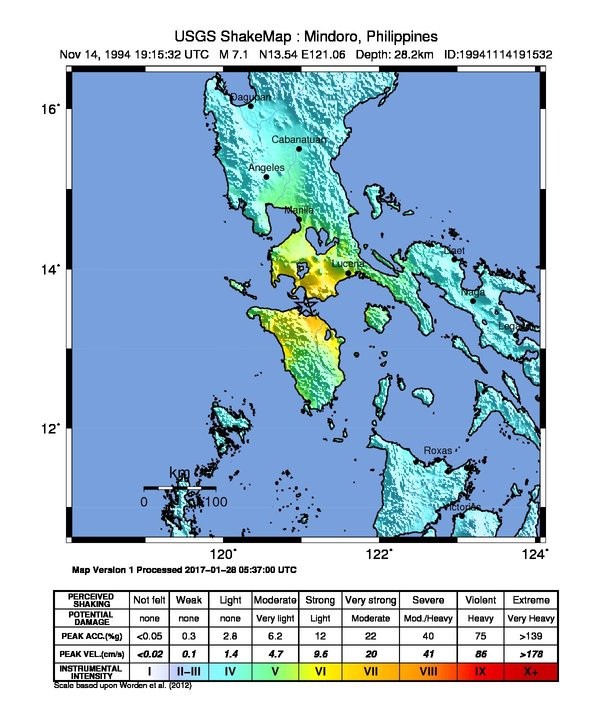

- UTC time: 1994-11-14 19:15:30
- ISC event: 141635
- USGS-ANSS: ComCat
- Local date: November 15, 1994
- Local time: 03:15 PST
- Magnitude: 7.1 M_{w}
- Depth: 31.5 km (19.6 mi)
- Epicenter: 13.525°N 121.067°E
- Type: Strike-slip
- Areas affected: Philippines
- Max. intensity: RFS VII (Very strong tremor)
- Tsunami: Yes
- Casualties: 78 killed, 225–340 injured

The 1994 Mindoro earthquake occurred at 03:15:30 PST on November 15 near Mindoro, Philippines. It had a moment magnitude of 7.1 and a maximum Rossi–Forel of VII (Very strong tremor). It is associated with a 35-kilometer-long (22 mi) ground rupture, called the Aglubang River fault. Seventy eight people were reported dead, and 7,566 houses were damaged. The earthquake generated a tsunami and landslides on the Verde Island.

== Earthquake ==
The epicenter of this earthquake was located in the Verde Island Passage, a strait separating Luzon and Mindoro. The focal mechanism showed predominantly right-lateral strike-slip faulting. The released seismic moment was about 5.12×10^{19} Nm.

=== Surface faulting ===
The Aglubang River fault, which shows a right-lateral strike-slip sense of movement, extends from Malaylay Island in the north of Oriental Mindoro to Alcate, Victoria in the south. Measurements along the rupture reveal a maximum horizontal displacement of 4 meters (13 ft) and a maximum vertical displacement of 1.9 meters (6 ft 3 in).

=== Tsunami ===
The earthquake generated a tsunami, which affected Mindoro, the Verde Island, the Baco Islands, and Luzon. Some concrete structures also suffered moderate damage in the tsunami. In Baco Islands, the vertical run-up reached 8.5 meters (28 ft). The tsunami was also recorded in Lobo. The tsunami was larger than expected considering the strike-slip movement of the earthquake.

== See also ==
- List of earthquakes in 1994
- List of earthquakes in the Philippines
