= 1994 Bolivia earthquake =

Earthquake in Bolivia

- Location within Bolivia
- UTC time: 1994-06-09 00:33:16
- ISC event: 168418
- USGS-ANSS: ComCat
- Local date: June 8, 1994
- Local time: 20:33:16
- Magnitude: 8.2 M_{w}
- Depth: 631.3 km (392 mi)
- Epicenter: 13°8′S 67°6′W
- Areas affected: Bolivia
- Max. intensity: MMI VI (Strong)
- Casualties: 5 dead (unconfirmed)

The 1994 Bolivia earthquake occurred on June 8, 1994, at 20:33 local time. The epicenter was located in a sparsely populated region in the Amazon jungle, 55 kilometres (34 mi) NNW of Reyes, Bolivia.

The Harvard CMT Project assigned it a focal depth of 647 km (402 mi), while USGS assigned it a depth of 631.3 km (392.3 mi). Both assigned it a magnitude M_{w} of 8.2, making it, at the time, the largest earthquake since the 1977 Sumba earthquake, before being surpassed less than 4 months later by an 8.3 M_{w} earthquake in the Kuril Islands. It is also tied with the August 19, 2018 Fiji Earthquake as the second largest ever earthquake recorded deep focus earthquake (where the focal depth exceeds 300 km (190 mi)), only behind the 2013 Okhotsk Sea earthquake, while also being the largest in South America.

== Description ==
The rupture was located within the Nazca plate where it is being subducted beneath the mantle of the South American continent. It shook the ground from Argentina to Canada and its oscillations were the first to be captured on a modern seismic network. Such deep events are known as intraplate earthquakes because they occur within a tectonic lithosphere rather than at the boundary of two. The earthquake involved a particularly narrow slip area of 30 km (19 mi) by 50 km (31 mi). In 22 seconds, the rupture propagated with a velocity of 1.5 km (0.93 mi) per second, which is slower than the average rupture velocity of earthquakes.

== Effects ==
There were unconfirmed reports of five people killed in Peru's Arequipa and Cuzco provinces. Three deaths from Arequipa Province were attributed to a landslide while the other two in Cuzco Province died from falling debris or a heart attack. Many more were injured in landslides in other parts of southern Peru. In Cochabamba, La Paz and Oruro, the windows in many tall structures shattered. There were unverified claims of buildings damaged in Arica, Chile, and Manaus, Brazil. Limited damage to buildings was reported in São Paulo, Brazil, and Toronto, Canada, as well. In Chile, the tremors caused panic among residents of major cities, driving them out of buildings. It also disrupted power and communication services. Due to the earthquake's great depth, it was felt at places far from its epicenter. A geologist with the US Geological Survey described the effects in Los Angeles, California, as a "very gentle motion". Similar effects were observed in Sioux Falls, Sioux City, Minneapolis, and Omaha in the United States.

== See also ==
- 1582 Ancuancu earthquake
- Deep-focus earthquakes
- List of earthquakes in 1994
