= 1953 Suva earthquake =

Earthquake in Fiji

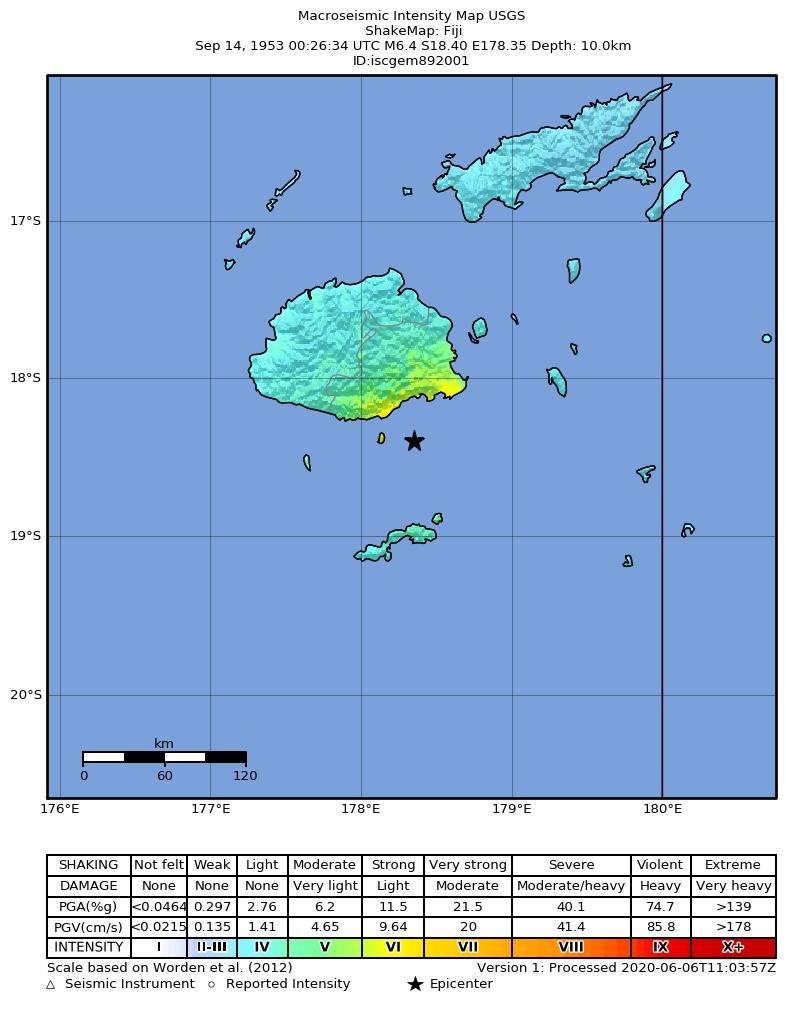

- Location within Fiji
- UTC time: 1953-09-14 00:26:34
- ISC event: 892001
- USGS-ANSS: ComCat
- Local date: 14 September 1953
- Local time: 12:26:34
- Magnitude: 6.8 M_{s}, 6.4 M_{w}
- Depth: 10 km (6.2 mi)
- Epicenter: 18.2°S 178.3°E
- Areas affected: Fiji
- Max. intensity: MMI VII (Very strong)
- Tsunami: local
- Casualties: 8 dead

The 1953 Suva earthquake occurred on 14 September at 00:26 UTC near Suva, Fiji, just off the southeast shore of Viti Levu. This earthquake had an estimated magnitude of M_{s} 6.8 and M_{w} 6.4. The earthquake triggered a coral reef platform collapse and a submarine landslide that caused a tsunami. Eight people were reported killed.

== Tectonic setting ==
Fiji lies in a complex tectonic setting along the boundary between the Australian plate and the Pacific plate. Southwards from Fiji the Pacific plate is subducting beneath the Australian plate along the Tonga Trench forming the Tonga Ridge island arc system and the Lau Basin back-arc basin. To the southwest of Fiji the Australian plate is subducting beneath the Pacific plate forming the Vanuatu Ridge island arc system and the North Fiji back-arc basin. Hence, the region has undergone a complex process of plate convergence, subduction, and arc volcanism from the Middle Eocene to the Early Pliocene. Many of the larger islands, such as Viti Levu, are of volcanic origin. Volcanism still exists, and there are Holocene volcanos in Fiji.

The Fiji Platform lies in a zone bordered with active extension fault lines around which most of the shallow earthquakes were centered. These fault lines are the Fiji fracture zone (FFZ) to the north, the 176° Extension Zone (176°E EZ) to the west, and the Hunter fracture zone (HFZ) to the east.

== Earthquake ==
The earthquake lasted between 25 and 30 seconds and had an estimated magnitude of 6.75 on the surface-wave magnitude scale. The calculated focal mechanism is consistent with slightly oblique dextral (right lateral) strike-slip on a NW-SE trending fault plane, matching the orientation of other fault planes measured in the area and a marked bathymetric lineament. The fault parameters calculated for the earthquake are a length of 30 km (19 mi), a width of 27 km (17 mi) and a slip of 1 m (3 ft 3 in). The NW trending nodal plane of this earthquake coincides with the strike of the NW trending Naqara Fault on the southeast coast of Viti Levu.

=== Tsunami ===
The first sign of a tsunami was observed about one minute after the earthquake when a disturbance of the sea surface was noticed by the captain of the cutter Adi Tirisa located about 6.4–8.0 km (4.0–5.0 mi) southwest of Suva. The boat shook severely before "three great spouts burst out of the sea, carrying mud, stones, and part of a long-wrecked vessel". The location of this disturbance was at the western end of the entrance to the Suva Passage.

The tsunami was triggered by an earthquake-induced partial collapse of a barrier reef at Suva into the Suva Canyon. The current reef edge shows the effects of repeated slope failure. The characteristics of the 1953 landslide scar were investigated using a high resolution multibeam echo sounder. The area immediately offshore from the reef is a composite failure surface, where a young scar measuring 800 m (2,600 ft) in width was identified. The slide had an estimated volume of 60,000,000 m^{3} (2.1×10^{9} cu ft). Numerical modelling of a landslide successfully reproduced most of the tsunami observations.

The first tsunami wave, measuring 0.3 m (1 ft 0 in), struck Beqa some thirty seconds after the earthquake. Fifteen minutes later, a 1.2–1.5 m (3 ft 11 in – 4 ft 11 in) wave arrived. On Viti Levu, waves estimated at 3–15 m (9.8–49.2 ft) were observed around the coral reefs off the island's southern coast. As these waves swept onto land, they deposited remnants of the coral reef. A tsunami of 20 cm (7.9 in) amplitude was recorded by the tide gauge in Pago Pago. Just over seven hours after the earthquake, in Honolulu and Port Allen, the tsunami wave measured 6 cm (2.4 in) and 10 cm (3.9 in).

=== Damage and casualties ===
This earthquake was the most destructive in Fiji's recorded history; killing three people and seriously injuring twenty others. The most serious damage occurred in the southeastern part of Viti Levu. A wharf, bridges, and buildings were also severely damaged at Suva. The tsunami caused particular damage to coastal areas unprotected by barrier reefs, devastating the villages of Nakasaleka and Makaluva. There were five deaths from the tsunami, three at Suva and two at Nakasaleka. Had the tsunami occurred at high tide, rather than low tide it would have been more damaging. The landslide that caused the tsunami generated turbidity currents that damaged several underwater cables in the Suva Canyon. The total damage caused by earthquake and tsunami was estimated at $500 thousand.

== See also ==
- List of earthquakes in 1953
- List of earthquakes in Fiji
