= 1963 Kuril Islands earthquake =

Earthquake east of the Kuril Islands, Soviet Union

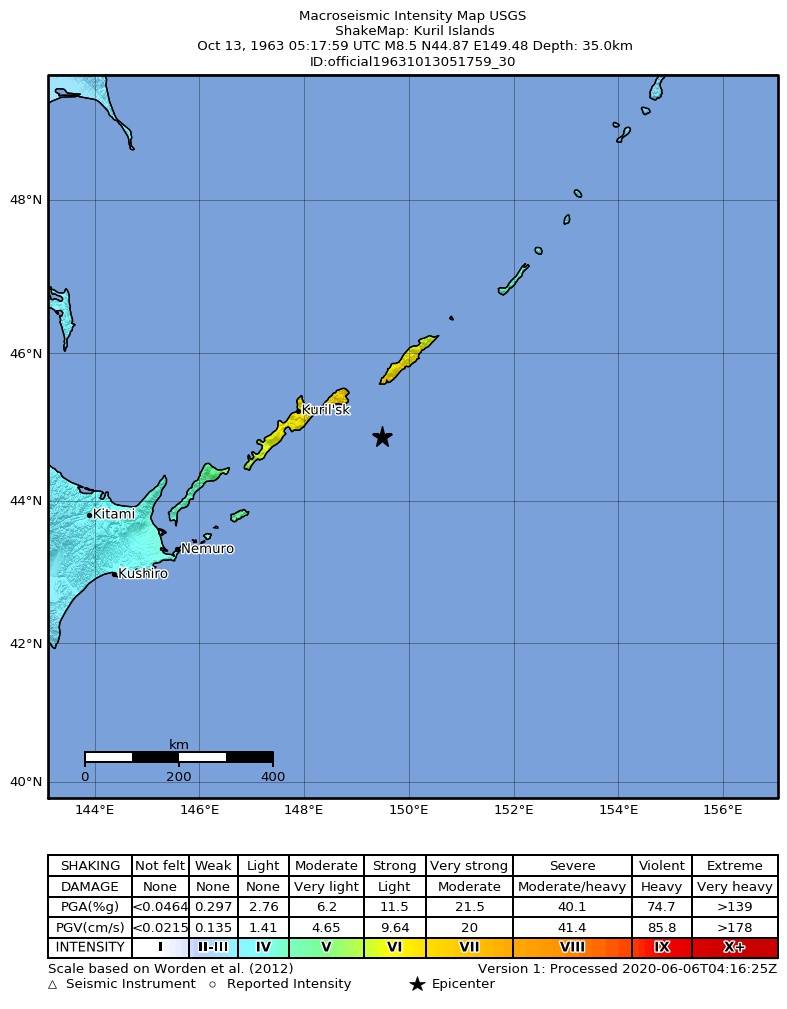
- USGS ShakeMap

- Location within Sakhalin Oblast
- UTC time: 1963-10-13 05:17:59
- ISC event: 873239
- USGS-ANSS: ComCat
- Local date: October 13, 1963
- Local time: 15:17:59
- Duration: 93 seconds
- Magnitude: 8.5 M_{w}
- Depth: 47 km (29 mi)
- Epicenter: 44.81°N 149.54°E
- Areas affected: Soviet Union
- Max. intensity: MMI IX (Violent)
- Tsunami: Yes

The 1963 Kuril Islands earthquake occurred at 05:17 UTC, on October 13. The earthquake had a moment magnitude (M_{w}) of 8.5 and was followed by an M_{w} 7.8 event seven days later. Both earthquakes triggered tsunamis that were observed around the northern part of the Pacific Ocean.

== Tectonic setting ==
The Kuril Islands form part of the island arc formed above the subduction zone, where the Pacific plate is being subducted beneath the North American plate. This convergent boundary has been the site of many large megathrust earthquakes, including the second largest earthquake ever recorded.

== Damage ==
No damage, deaths, or injuries were recorded for these two earthquakes or their associated tsunamis.

== Characteristics ==
=== Earthquake ===
The megathrust earthquake ruptured a 250 km-long section of the Kuril–Kamchatka Trench which based on pulses of shock registered on seismometer records, found to have contained three particular areas of asperity with high amounts of slip inside the torn subduction interface, each roughly 50 km in length and M_{w} 7.5 in energy.

=== Tsunami ===
The tsunami triggered by the earthquake of October 13, caused a 4.5 m wave locally. The tsunami was also observed in Canada, Japan, Mexico, Hawaii, Alaska, California, and on many islands across the northern Pacific Ocean. The tsunami associated with the October 20 event was larger in the nearby area, with a maximum recorded run-up of 15 m at Urup, but was only observed in the western part of the northern Pacific.

== See also ==
- 1994 Kuril Islands earthquake
- 2006 Kuril Islands earthquake
- 2007 Kuril Islands earthquake
- List of earthquakes in 1963
- List of earthquakes in Japan
- List of earthquakes in Russia
