= Nasa Kiwe Corporation =

Colombian relief agency

- Corporación Nasa Kiwe

Agency overview
- Formed: 9 June 1994
- Headquarters: Calle 1AN № 2-39; Popayán, Cauca, Colombia
- Annual budget: COP$8,055,650,165 (2011); COP$14,319,342,129 (2012); COP$19,157,723,338 (2013)
- Agency executive: John Diego Parra Tobar, Director
- Parent agency: Ministry of the Interior
- Website: www.nasakiwe.gov.co

The Nasa Kiwe National Corporation for the Reconstruction of the Páez River Basin and its Surrounding Areas (Spanish: Corporación Nacional para la Reconstrucción de la Cuenca del Río Páez y Zonas Aledañas NASA KIWE), or Nasa Kiwe Corporation (CNK), is a relief agency of the Government of Colombia created after the 1994 Páez River earthquake and its following aftermath, to help the victims and the affected communities of the Paez River basin area and to finance reconstruction projects.
