= 2007 Kuril Islands earthquake =

Earthquake in Japan

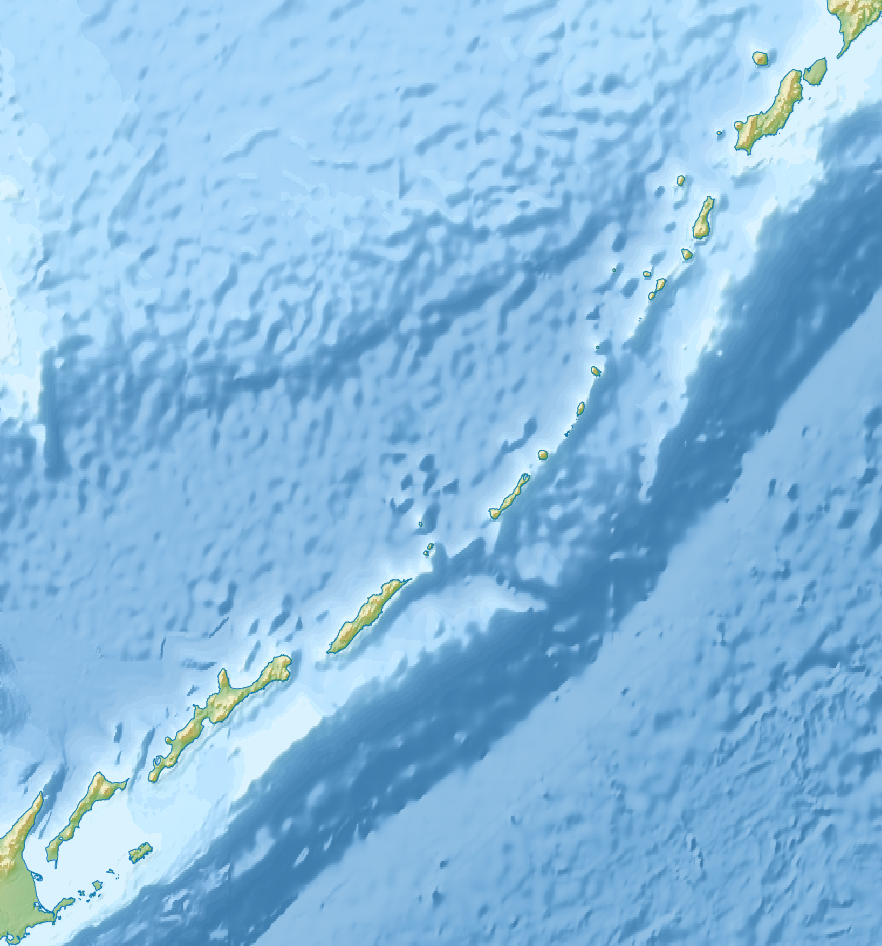
- Location within Kuril Islands Location within Far Eastern Federal District
- UTC time: 2007-01-13 04:23:21
- ISC event: 10385751
- USGS-ANSS: ComCat
- Local date: 13 January 2007
- Local time: 13:23 JST
- Magnitude: 8.1 M_{w}
- Depth: 5.7 kilometres (4 mi)
- Epicenter: 46.08°N 154.51°E
- Type: Normal
- Areas affected: Kuril Islands; Japan
- Max. intensity: MMI VI (Strong) JMA 3
- Tsunami: 0.32 m (1 ft 1 in)

The 2007 Kuril Islands earthquake occurred east of the Kuril Islands on 13 January at 1:23 p.m. (JST). The shock had a moment magnitude of 8.1 and a maximum Mercalli intensity of VI (Strong). A non-destructive tsunami was generated, with maximum wave amplitudes of 0.32 meters (1 ft 1 in). The earthquake is considered a doublet of the 8.3 magnitude 2006 Kuril Islands earthquake which occurred two months prior on 15 November 2006 approximately 95 km to the southeast.

== See also ==
- 1963 Kuril Islands earthquake
- 1994 Kuril Islands earthquake
- List of earthquakes in 2007
- List of earthquakes in Japan
- Kamchatka earthquakes
- Okhotsk microplate
