= 1994 Kuril Islands earthquake =

Earthquake in Japan

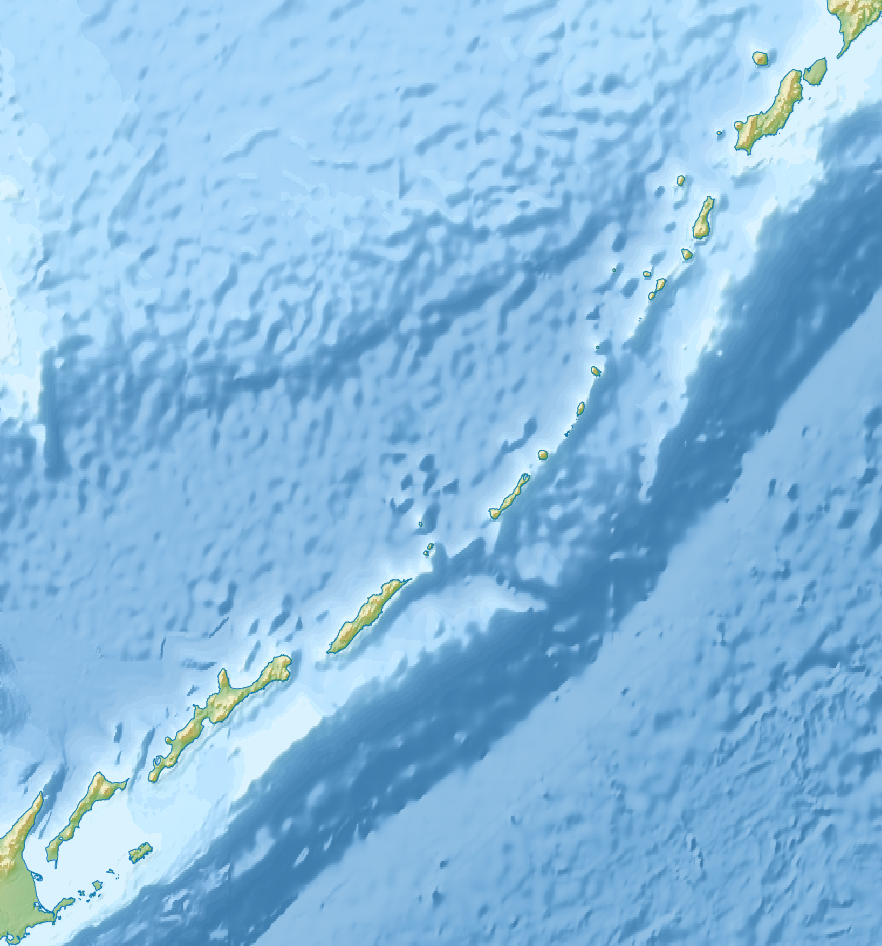
- Location within Kuril Islands Location within Far Eastern Federal District
- UTC time: 1994-10-04 13:23:00
- ISC event: 145456
- USGS-ANSS: ComCat
- Local date: October 5, 1994
- Local time: 00:23:00
- Magnitude: 8.3 M_{w} 8.1 M_{JMA}
- Depth: 30.0 km (18.6 mi)
- Epicenter: 43.85°N 147.17°E
- Areas affected: Russia and Japan
- Max. intensity: MMI IX (Violent)
- Casualties: 10–12 dead 242–1,742 injured 1,200 homeless

The 1994 Kuril Islands earthquake – also known as the Hokkaido Toho-oki earthquake – occurred on October 5 at 00:23:00 local time. The magnitude of this earthquake was put at M_{w}8.3, or M_{JMA} 8.1. The epicenter was located at about 70 km east of Shikotan Island. The shaking and tsunami caused road and building damage. At least 10 people were reported dead.

== Earthquake ==
This earthquake was an intra-slab earthquake within the Pacific plate which is subducting beneath the Okhotsk microplate.

=== Damage ===
Oil storage tanks in Malokurilsk and Krabozavodsk were damaged. An oil leak occurred and caused heavy contamination of the port area.

=== Intensity ===
The intensity was MSK VI~IX in Shikotan Island.

The earthquake could be felt in Tokyo with shindo 3, and in Hokkaido, the highest intensity reached shindo 6.

=== Aftershocks ===
A large aftershock of magnitude M_{w} 7.1 or M_{s} 7.7 occurred on October 9, 1994, at 07:55 UTC. It was located at 43.97° N, 148.22° E with a depth of 33 km. It generated a tsunami, and a peak-to-trough tsunami wave height of 18 cm was recorded in Hanasaki, Japan.

== Tsunami ==
A numerical simulation of the tsunami suggested that the first wave was caused by a significant subsidence north of the Kuril Islands due to the earthquake.

A peak-to-trough tsunami wave height of 3.46 m (11.4 ft) was recorded in Hanasaki, Japan.

This earthquake triggered a tsunami in the southern Kuril Islands and Hokkaido. The tsunami run-up height was more than 3 m in Yuzhno-Kurilsk bay and 5 m in Zelenyi Island, Russia.

The tsunami had a maximum runup height of 10.4 m (34 ft) at the southern part of Dimitrova Bay.

== See also ==
- List of earthquakes in 1994
- List of earthquakes in Russia
- April 1923 Kamchatka earthquake and tsunami
- 1963 Kuril Islands earthquake
- 2006 Kuril Islands earthquake
- 2007 Kuril Islands earthquake
- Kuril–Kamchatka Trench
