= Baco Islands =

Coordinates: 13°28′40″N 121°10′15″E

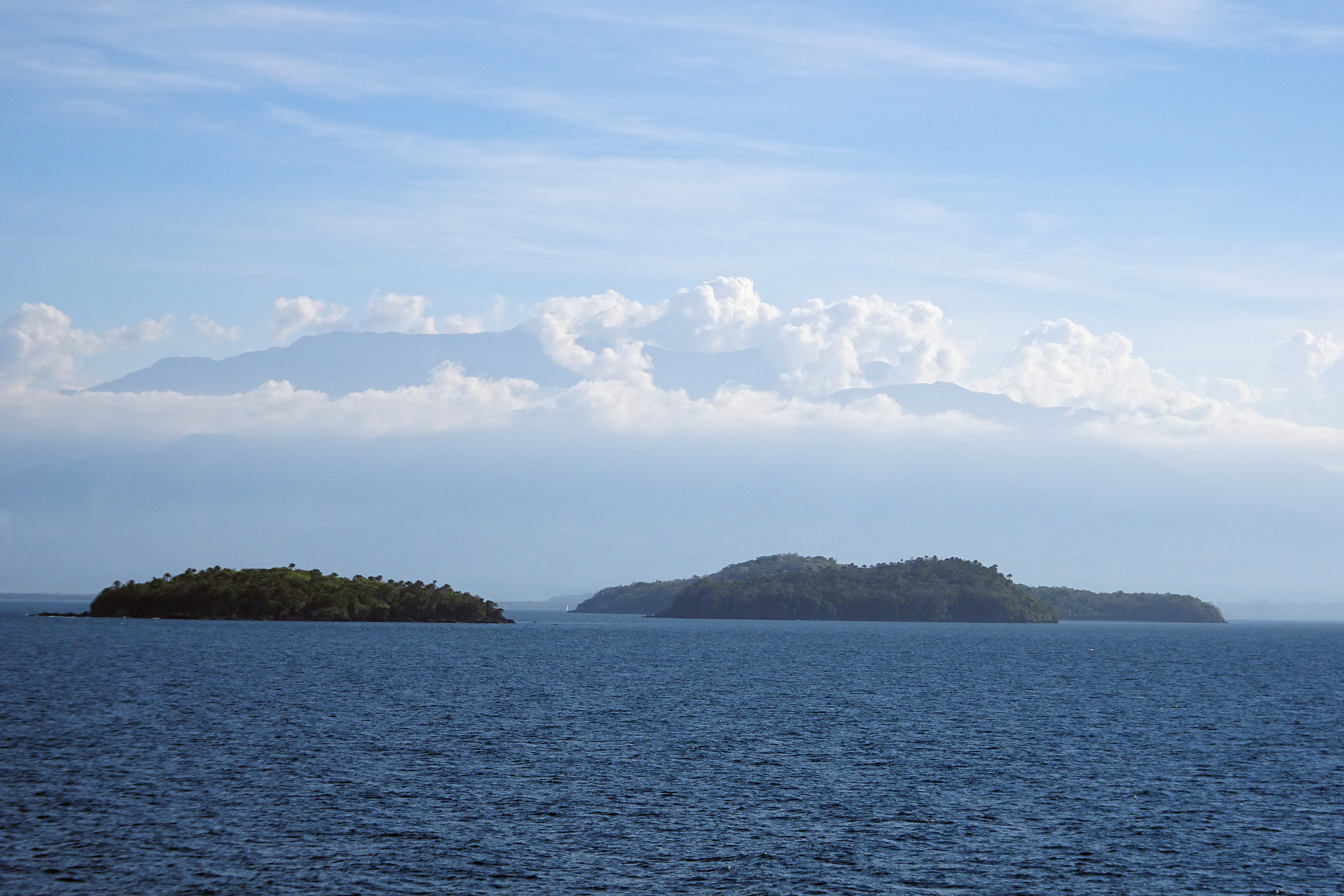
Baco Islands, with Mount Halcon looming in the background.

The Baco Islands are a chain of three small wooded islands in the Philippines, located off the northern coast of Mindoro island. The Baco Islands are located off the coast of Baco, Oriental Mindoro, in the Verde Island Passage and are administered as part of the city of Calapan. The island chain consists of:

- Baco Grande Island (also known as just Baco Island) – largest island in the southwest of the chain that is 295 feet (90 m) feet in elevation
- Baco Medio Island - middle island that is 260 feet (79 m) feet in elevation
- Baco Chico Island – smallest island in the northeast of the chain that is 130 feet (40 m) feet in elevation

== See also ==
- List of islands of the Philippines
