= Deep-focus earthquake =

Earthquake with a hypocenter depth exceeding 300 km

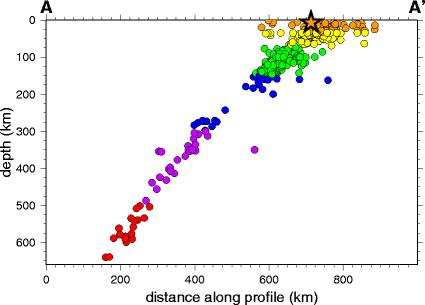
Seismicity cross-section across part of the Kuril Islands subduction zone. Many deep earthquakes have occurred.

A deep-focus earthquake in seismology is an earthquake with a hypocenter depth exceeding 300 km. They occur almost exclusively at convergent boundaries in association with subducted oceanic lithosphere. They occur along a dipping tabular zone beneath the subduction zone known as the Wadati–Benioff zone.

== Discovery ==
Preliminary evidence for the existence of deep-focus earthquakes was first brought to the attention of the scientific community in 1922 by Herbert Hall Turner. In 1928, Kiyoo Wadati proved the existence of earthquakes occurring well beneath the lithosphere, dispelling the notion that earthquakes occur only with shallow focal depths.

== Seismic characteristics ==
Deep-focus earthquakes give rise to minimal surface waves. Their focal depth causes the earthquakes to be less likely to produce seismic wave motion with energy concentrated at the surface. The path of deep-focus earthquake seismic waves from focus to recording station goes through the heterogeneous upper mantle and highly variable crust only once. Therefore, the body waves undergo less attenuation and reverberation than seismic waves from shallow earthquakes, resulting in sharp body wave peaks.

== Focal mechanisms ==
The pattern of energy radiation of an earthquake is represented by the moment tensor solution, which is graphically represented by beachball diagrams. An explosive or implosive mechanism produces an isotropic seismic source. Slip on a planar fault surface results in a double-couple source. Uniform outward motion in a single plane due to normal shortening is known as a compensated linear vector dipole source. Deep-focus earthquakes have been shown to contain a combination of these sources. The focal mechanisms of deep-focus earthquakes depend on their positions in subducting tectonic plates. At depths greater than 400 km, down-dip compression dominates, while at depths of 250–300 km (also corresponding to a minimum in earthquake numbers vs. depth), the stress regime is more ambiguous but closer to down-dip tension.

== Physical process ==
Shallow-focus earthquakes are the result of the sudden release of strain energy built up over time in rock by brittle fracture and frictional slip over planar surfaces. However, the physical mechanism of deep focus earthquakes is poorly understood. Subducted lithosphere subject to the pressure and temperature regime at depths greater than 300 km should not exhibit brittle behavior, but should rather respond to stress by plastic deformation. Several physical mechanisms have been proposed for the nucleation and propagation of deep-focus earthquakes; however, the exact process remains an outstanding problem in the field of deep-earth seismology.

The following four subsections outline proposals which could explain the physical mechanism allowing deep focus earthquakes to occur. With the exception of solid-solid phase transitions, the proposed theories for the focal mechanism of deep earthquakes hold equal footing in current scientific literature.

=== Solid-solid phase transitions ===
The earliest proposed mechanism for the generation of deep-focus earthquakes is an implosion due to a phase transition of material to a higher-density, lower-volume phase. The olivine-spinel phase transition is thought to occur at a depth of 410 km in the interior of the earth. This hypothesis proposes that metastable olivine in oceanic lithosphere subducted to depths greater than 410 km undergoes a sudden phase transition to spinel structure. The increase in density due to the reaction would cause an implosion giving rise to the earthquake. This mechanism has been largely discredited due to the lack of a significant isotropic signature in the moment tensor solution of deep-focus earthquakes.

=== Dehydration embrittlement ===
Dehydration reactions of mineral phases with high water content would increase the pore pressure in a subducted oceanic lithosphere. The increase in pore pressure is attributed to the release of fluids in-situ within the rock, thus raising its overall pressure. This effect reduces the effective normal stress in the slab and allows slip to occur on pre-existing fault planes at significantly greater depths than would normally be possible. Several workers suggest that this mechanism does not play a significant role in seismic activity beyond 350 km depth due to the fact that most dehydration reactions will have reached completion by a pressure corresponding to depths of 150–300 km (5-10 GPa).

=== Transformational faulting or anticrack faulting ===
Transformational faulting, also known as anticrack faulting, is the result of the phase transition of a mineral to a higher-density phase occurring in response to shear stress in a fine-grained shear zone. The transformation occurs along the plane of maximal shear stress. Rapid shearing can then occur along these planes of weakness, giving rise to an earthquake in a mechanism similar to a shallow-focus earthquake. Metastable olivine subducted past the olivine-wadsleyite transition at 320–410 km depth (depending on temperature) is a potential candidate for such instabilities. Arguments against this hypothesis include the requirements that the faulting region should be very cold, and contain very little mineral-bound hydroxyl. Higher temperatures or higher hydroxyl contents preclude the metastable preservation of olivine to the depths of the deepest earthquakes.

=== Shear instability / thermal runaway ===
A shear instability arises when heat is produced by plastic deformation faster than it can be conducted away. The result is thermal runaway, a positive feedback loop of heating, material weakening, and strain localisation within the shear zone. Continued weakening may result in partial melting along zones of maximal shear stress. Plastic shear instabilities leading to earthquakes have not been documented in nature, nor have they been observed in natural materials in the laboratory. Their relevance to deep earthquakes therefore lies in mathematical models which use simplified material properties and rheologies to simulate natural conditions.

== Deep-focus earthquake zones ==
=== Major zones ===
==== Eastern Asia / Western Pacific ====
On the border of the Pacific plate and the Okhotsk and Philippine Sea plates is one of the most active deep-focus earthquake regions in the world, creating many large earthquakes including the M_{w} 8.3 2013 Okhotsk Sea earthquake. As with many places, earthquakes in this region are caused by internal stresses on the subducted Pacific plate as it is pushed deeper into the mantle.

==== Philippines ====
A subduction zone makes up most of the border of Philippine Sea plate and Sunda plate, the fault being partially responsible for the uplift of the Philippines. The deepest sections of the Philippine Sea plate cause earthquakes as deep as 675 kilometres (419 mi) below the surface. Notable deep-focus earthquakes in this region include a M_{w} 7.7 earthquake in 1972 and the M_{w} 7.6, 7.5, and 7.3 2010 Mindanao earthquakes. Another one is Lubang Fault responsible for making strong and deep earthquakes, usually 100-600km deep. Notable ones include the 2021 Mw6.6 Batangas Earthquake and tons of Mw6.3 earthquakes since 2000. These earthquakes ranges 100-300km deep and usually has an PEIS I-VI rating.

==== Indonesia ====
The Australian plate subducts under the Sunda plate, creating uplift over much of southern Indonesia, as well as earthquakes at depths of up to 675 kilometres (419 mi). Notable deep-focus earthquakes in this region include a M_{w} 7.9 earthquake in 1996 and a M_{w} 7.5 earthquake in 2007.

==== Papua New Guinea / Fiji / New Zealand ====
By far the most active deep focus faulting zone in the world is that caused by the Pacific plate subducting under the Australian plate, Tonga plate, and Kermadec plate. Earthquakes have been recorded at depths of over 735 kilometres (457 mi), the deepest in the planet. The large area of subduction results in a broad swath of deep-focus earthquakes centered from Papua New Guinea to Fiji to New Zealand, although the angle of the plates' collision causes the area between Fiji and New Zealand to be the most active, with earthquakes of M_{w} 4.0 or above occurring on an almost daily basis. Notable deep-focus earthquakes in this region include a M_{w} 8.2 and 7.9 earthquake in 2018, and a M_{w} 7.8 earthquake in 1919.

==== Andes ====
The subduction of the Nazca plate under the South American plate, in addition to creating the Andes mountain range, has also created a number of deep faults under the surfaces of Colombia, Peru, Brazil, Bolivia, Argentina, and even as far east as Paraguay. Earthquakes frequently occur in the region at depths of up to 670 kilometres (420 mi) beneath the surface. Several large earthquakes have taken place here, including the M_{w} 8.2 1994 Bolivia earthquake (631 km deep), the M_{w} 8.0 1970 Colombia earthquake (645 km deep), and M_{w} 7.9 1922 Peru earthquake (475 km deep).

=== Minor zones ===
==== Granada, Spain ====
Roughly 600–630 kilometres (370–390 mi) under the city Granada in southern Spain, several large earthquakes have been recorded in modern history, notably including a M_{w} 7.8 earthquake in 1954, and a M_{w} 6.3 earthquake in 2010. The exact cause for the earthquakes remains enigmatic. More recent research analyzing the 2010 earthquake suggests that the seismic region is associated with a deep oceanic slab (the Alboran Slab) subducted by the converging African and Eurasian plates and flipping upside down in the process, trapping previously near-surface water-saturated rocks underneath it. The observed earthquakes then may be caused by hydrated magnesium silicates in the rock dehydrating and becoming more brittle. The level of hydration in the slab suggests it was subducted unusually fast given its depth, roughly 7 cm/yr.

==== Tyrrhenian Sea ====
The Tyrrhenian Sea west of Italy is host to a large number of deep-focus earthquakes as deep as 520 kilometres (320 mi) below the surface. However, very few earthquakes occur in the region less than 100 kilometres (62 mi) deep, the majority originating from a depth of around 250–300 kilometres (160–190 mi). Due to the lack of shallow earthquakes, the faulting is believed to originate from an ancient subduction zone that began subducting less than 15 million years ago, and largely finished around 10 million years ago, no longer visible on the surface. Due to the calculated subduction rate, the cause for subduction was likely to be internal stressing on the Eurasian plate, rather than due to the collision of the African and Eurasian plates, the cause of modern-day subduction for the nearby Aegean Sea and Anatolian microplates.

==== Afghanistan ====
In northeastern Afghanistan, a number of medium-intensity deep focus earthquakes of depths of up to 400 kilometres (250 mi) occasionally occur. They are caused by the collision and subduction of the Indian plate under the Eurasian plate, the deepest earthquakes centered on the furthest-subducted sections of the plate.

==== South Sandwich Islands ====
The South Sandwich Islands between South America and Antarctica are host to a number of earthquakes up to 320 kilometres (200 mi) in depth. They are caused by the subduction of the South American plate under the South Sandwich plate.

=== Notable deep-focus earthquakes ===
The strongest deep-focus earthquake in seismic record was the magnitude 8.3 Okhotsk Sea earthquake that occurred at a depth of 609 km (378 mi) in 2013. The deepest earthquake ever recorded was a small 4.2 earthquake in Vanuatu at a depth of 735.8 km (457.2 mi) in 2004. However, although unconfirmed, an aftershock of the 2015 Ogasawara earthquake was found to have occurred at a depth of 751 km (467 mi).

== See also ==
- Intermediate-depth earthquake
- Earth's mantle
