= 2006 Kuril Islands earthquake =

Earthquake in Japan

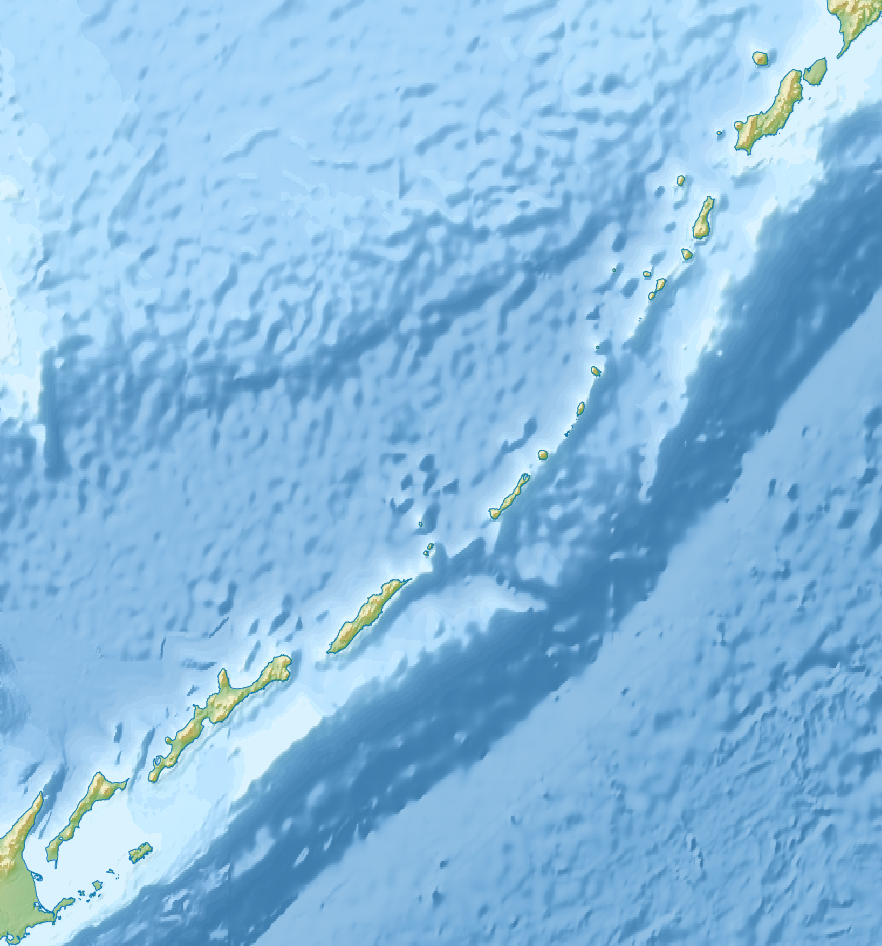
- Location within Kuril Islands Location within Far Eastern Federal District
- UTC time: 2006-11-15 11:14:13
- ISC event: 9235276
- USGS-ANSS: ComCat
- Local date: November 15, 2006
- Local time: 8:14 pm
- Magnitude: 8.3 M_{w}
- Depth: 31 km (19 mi)
- Epicenter: 46.592°N 153.266°E
- Fault: Kuril–Kamchatka Trench
- Type: Megathrust
- Areas affected: Japan, Russia
- Max. intensity: MMI IV (Light) JMA 2
- Tsunami: Up to 21.9 m (72 ft) in Matua Island, Kuril Islands
- Casualties: 1 injured

The 2006 Kuril Islands earthquake occurred on November 15 at 8:14:16 pm JST with a moment magnitude (M_{w}) of 8.3 and shaking that reached a maximum Mercalli intensity of IV (Light) and a maximum Shindo intensity of JMA 2. This megathrust earthquake was the largest event in the central Kuril Islands since 1915 and generated a small tsunami that affected the northern Japanese coast. The tsunami crossed the Pacific Ocean and damaged the harbor at Crescent City, California. Post-tsunami surveys indicate that the local tsunami in the central Kuril Islands reached runups of 21.9 metres (72 ft) or higher.

== Earthquake ==
This earthquake occurred on the Kuril-Kamchatka subduction zone and had a focal mechanism corresponding to thrust faulting. Based on the energy-to-moment ratio, the earthquake released seismic energy slowly relative to its seismic moment, making this an example of a tsunami earthquake. It is also considered a doublet of the 2007 Kuril Islands earthquake that hit the same area on January 13, 2007.

== Tsunami ==
At about 11:45 UTC, tsunami warnings were issued in Japan for the northern coasts of Hokkaidō and Honshū, and a number of towns in this area were very quickly evacuated. Tsunami warnings, advisories and watches were also issued for the coastal areas of Alaska, Hawaii, parts of British Columbia, Washington, Oregon, and California. JMA initially estimated tsunami waves to be as tall as 2 metres when it hit the Japanese northern and eastern coasts, but it turned out to be merely 40 centimetres when it reached Hanasaki Port, Nemuro, Hokkaidō at 9:29 pm local time. The tsunami also hit the rest of Hokkaidō and the Tōhoku Region. The tallest wave recorded in Japan was at Tsubota (坪田), Miyakejima (三宅島), at 84 centimetres. Tsunami also hit as far as Amami in Kagoshima Prefecture and Naha in Okinawa Prefecture, and reached the Hawaiian and California coasts. A 176-centimetre wave in the harbor at Crescent City, California caused an estimated $10 million in damage to the docks. The United States authorities had issued warnings for the Russian Far East, Japan, Wake Island and Midway Atoll.

The nearfield tsunami struck islands with no current inhabitants. However, geologists and archaeologists had visited these islands the previous summer, and returned in the summers of 2007 and 2008. Because there were two central Kurils tsunamis in the winter of 2006/2007 (see 2007 Kuril Islands earthquake), the specific effects of each tsunami are difficult to determine; but evidence shows that the 2006 tsunami was the larger on all islands in the Kurils except for parts of Rasshua.

== See also ==
- List of earthquakes in 2006
- List of earthquakes in Russia
- List of earthquakes in Japan
- 1952 Severo-Kurilsk earthquake
- 1963 Kuril Islands earthquake
- 1994 Kuril Islands earthquake
- 2007 Kuril Islands earthquake
