= 2013 Okhotsk Sea earthquake =

- Location within Kamchatka Krai Location within Far Eastern Federal District
- UTC time: 2013-05-24 05:44:48
- ISC event: 603007131
- USGS-ANSS: ComCat
- Local date: 24 May 2013
- Local time: 15:44
- Magnitude: 8.3 M_{w}
- Depth: 609 km (378 mi)
- Epicenter: 54.892°N 153.221°E
- Areas affected: Russia
- Max. intensity: MMI V (Moderate) JMA 3
- Casualties: None

The 2013 Okhotsk Sea earthquake occurred with a moment magnitude of 8.3 at 15:44:49 local time (05:44:49 UTC) on 24 May. It had an epicenter in the Sea of Okhotsk and affected primarily (but not only) Asian Russia, especially the Kamchatka Peninsula where the shaking lasted for five minutes.

== Earthquake ==
The earthquake had a moment magnitude of 8.3 and was the largest to strike Russia since 2006. Due to its great depth of 609 km, it was not particularly intense at the surface, but was felt over a very large area. Such a deep-focus earthquake could be felt not only in areas surrounding the Okhotsk Sea but also in places as far as Tokyo (JMA 1, about 2,400 km away from the epicenter), Nanjing (more than 4,000 km away), Atyrau (MMI V, about 7,200 km away), Moscow (about 7,400 km away), and Belgrade (about 8,100 km away). Maximum recorded JMA intensity was Shindo 3 (equivalent to IV (Light) on the MMI Scale) in one locality each in Hokkaido and Akita prefectures.

A related aftershock with a magnitude M_{w}6.7 occurred at 02:56 local time (14:52 UTC on 24 May), 9 hours after the earthquake, producing a supershear earthquake. It was an extremely deep (640 km or 400 mi) supershear as well as unusually fast at "eight kilometers per second (five miles per second), nearly 50 percent faster than the shear wave velocity at that depth".

== Impact ==
In Moscow, the shaking caused almost 900 residents to be evacuated from their homes. In the city, small cracks appeared in several buildings. In Samara, a poorly constructed house collapsed and seventeen others were slightly damaged, despite the shaking being so weak there. In Saint Petersburg, one person had to be medically cared for in an office block due to nausea caused by the swaying building. In Yakutsk, 1,500 km from the epicenter, a bridge cracked. In Heilongjiang, China, a school was evacuated due to the shaking.

== See also ==
- List of earthquakes in 2013
- List of earthquakes in Russia
