= Modified Mercalli intensity scale =

Seismic intensity scale used to quantify the degree of shaking during earthquakes

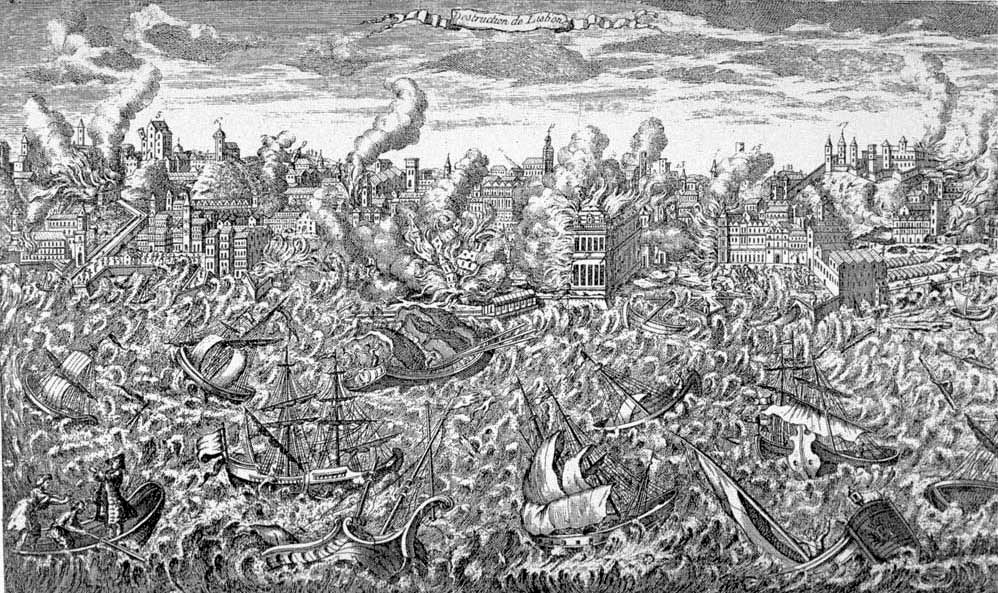
Lisbon, Portugal, during the Great Lisbon earthquake in 1755

The Modified Mercalli intensity scale (MM, MMI, or MCS) measures the effects of an earthquake at a given location. This is in contrast with the seismic magnitude usually reported for an earthquake.

Magnitude scales measure the inherent force or strength of an earthquake — an event occurring at greater or lesser depth. (The "M_{w}" scale is widely used.) The MMI scale measures intensity of shaking, at any particular location, on the surface. It was developed from Giuseppe Mercalli's Mercalli intensity scale of 1902.

While shaking experienced at the surface is caused by the seismic energy released by an earthquake, earthquakes differ in how much of their energy is radiated as seismic waves. They also differ in the depth at which they occur; deeper earthquakes have less interaction with the surface, their energy is spread throughout a larger volume, and the energy reaching the surface is spread across a larger area. Shaking intensity is localised. It generally diminishes with distance from the earthquake's epicentre, but it can be amplified in sedimentary basins and in certain kinds of unconsolidated soils.

Intensity scales categorise intensity empirically, based on the effects reported by untrained observers, and are adapted for the effects that might be observed in a particular region. By not requiring instrumental measurements, they are useful for estimating the magnitude and location of historical (pre-instrumental) earthquakes: the greatest intensities generally correspond to the epicentral area, and their degree and extent (possibly augmented by knowledge of local geological conditions) can be compared with other local earthquakes to estimate the magnitude.

== History ==
Italian volcanologist Giuseppe Mercalli formulated his first intensity scale in 1883. It had six degrees or categories, has been described as "merely an adaptation" of the then-standard Rossi–Forel scale of 10 degrees, and is now "more or less forgotten". Mercalli's second scale, published in 1902, was also an adaptation of the Rossi–Forel scale, retaining the 10 degrees and expanding the descriptions of each degree. This version "found favour with the users", and was adopted by the Italian Central Office of Meteorology and Geodynamics.

In 1904, Adolfo Cancani proposed adding two additional degrees for very strong earthquakes, "catastrophe" and "enormous catastrophe", thus creating a 12-degree scale. His descriptions being deficient, August Heinrich Sieberg augmented them during 1912 and 1923, and indicated a peak ground acceleration for each degree. This became known as the "Mercalli–Cancani scale, formulated by Sieberg", or the "Mercalli–Cancani–Sieberg scale", or simply "MCS", and was used extensively in Europe and remains in use in Italy by the National Institute of Geophysics and Volcanology (INGV).

When Harry O. Wood and Frank Neumann translated this into English in 1931 (along with modification and condensation of the descriptions, and removal of the acceleration criterion), they named it the "modified Mercalli intensity scale of 1931" (MM31). Some seismologists refer to this version as the "Wood–Neumann scale". Wood and Neumann also had an abridged version, with fewer criteria for assessing the degree of intensity.

The Wood–Neumann scale was revised in 1956 by Charles Francis Richter and published in his influential textbook Elementary Seismology. Not wanting to have this intensity scale confused with the Richter scale he had developed, he proposed calling it the "modified Mercalli scale of 1956" (MM56).

In their 1993 compendium of historical seismicity in the United States, Carl Stover and Jerry Coffman ignored Richter's revision, and assigned intensities according to their slightly modified interpretation of Wood and Neumann's 1931 scale, (Note: Their modifications were mainly to degrees IV and V, with VI contingent on reports of damage to man-made structures, and VII considering only "damage to buildings or other man-made structures". See details at Stover & Coffman 1993, pp. 3–4.) effectively creating a new, but largely undocumented version of the scale.

The basis by which the United States Geological Survey (and other agencies) assigns intensities is nominally Wood and Neumann's MM31. However, this is generally interpreted with the modifications summarised by Stover and Coffman because in the decades since 1931, "some criteria are more reliable than others as indicators of the level of ground shaking". Also, construction codes and methods have evolved, making much of built environment stronger; these make a given intensity of ground shaking seem weaker. Also, some of the original criteria of the most intense degrees (X and above), such as bent rails, ground fissures, landslides, etc., are "related less to the level of ground shaking than to the presence of ground conditions susceptible to spectacular failure".

The categories "catastrophe" and "enormous catastrophe" added by Cancani (XI and XII) are used so infrequently that current USGS practice is to merge them into a single category "Extreme" abbreviated as "X+".

== Scale values ==
The lesser degrees of the MMI scale generally describe the manner in which the earthquake is felt by people. The greater numbers of the scale are based on observed structural damage.

This table gives MMIs that are typically observed at locations near the epicentre of the earthquake.

Scale level	Peak ground acceleration (approx.)	Ground conditions	Examples
I. Not felt	<0.0005 g_{0} (0.0049 m/s^{2})	Not felt except by very few under especially favorable conditions.	2007–2008 Nazko
II. Weak	0.003 g_{0} (0.029 m/s^{2})	Felt only by a few people at rest, especially on upper floors of buildings. Delicately suspended objects may swing.	2012 El Salvador
III. Weak	0.003 g_{0} (0.029 m/s^{2})	Felt quite noticeably by people indoors, especially on upper floors of buildings. Many people do not recognise it as an earthquake. Standing vehicles may slightly rock. Vibrations are similar to the passing of a truck, with duration estimated.	1992 Nicaragua
IV. Light	0.028 g_{0} (0.27 m/s^{2})	Felt indoors by many, outdoors by few during the day. At night, some are awakened. Dishes, windows, and doors are disturbed; walls make cracking sounds. Sensations are like a heavy truck striking a building. Standing vehicles are rocked noticeably.	2006 Pangandaran
V. Moderate	0.062 g_{0} (0.61 m/s^{2})	Felt by nearly everyone; many awakened. Some dishes and windows are broken. Unstable objects are overturned. Pendulum clocks may stop.	2010 Mentawai; 2013 Okhotsk Sea
VI. Strong	0.12 g_{0} (1.2 m/s^{2})	Felt by all, and many are frightened. Some heavy furniture is moved; a few instances of fallen plaster occur. Damage is slight.	1946 Aleutian Islands; 1994 Bolivia; 2009 Samoa
VII. Very strong	0.22 g_{0} (2.2 m/s^{2})	Damage is negligible in buildings of good design and construction; but slight to moderate in well-built ordinary structures; damage is considerable in poorly built or badly designed structures; some chimneys are broken. Noticed by motorists.	1957 Farsinaj; 1968 Illinois
VIII. Severe	0.40 g_{0} (3.9 m/s^{2})	Damage is slight in specially designed structures; considerable damage in ordinary substantial buildings with partial collapse. Damage is great in poorly built structures. The fall of chimneys, factory stacks, columns, monuments, and walls occur. Heavy furniture is overturned. Sand and mud is ejected in small amounts. Changes occur in well water. Motorists are disturbed.	1970 Ancash; 2002 Bou'in-Zahra; 2011 Van
IX. Violent	0.75 g_{0} (7.4 m/s^{2})	Damage is considerable in specially designed structures; well-designed frame structures are thrown off-kilter. Damage is great in substantial buildings, with partial collapse. Buildings are shifted off foundations. Liquefaction occurs. Underground pipes are broken.	1975 Haicheng; 1985 Mexico City; 2004 Indian Ocean; 2010 Baja California
X. Extreme	>1.39 g_{0} (13.6 m/s^{2})	Some well-built wooden structures are destroyed; most masonry and frame structures are destroyed with foundations. Rails are bent. Landslides are considerable from river banks and steep slopes. Sand and mud is shifted. Water is splashed over banks.	1990 Manjil–Rudbar; 2010 Haiti; 2018 Sulawesi
XI. Extreme	>1.39 g_{0} (13.6 m/s^{2})	Few, if any, (masonry) structures remain standing. Bridges are destroyed. Broad fissures erupt in the ground. Underground pipelines are rendered completely out of service. Earth slumps and landslips occur on soft ground. Rails are greatly bent.	1952 Kern County; 1995 Kobe; 2008 Sichuan
XII. Extreme	>1.39 g_{0} (13.6 m/s^{2})	Damage is total. Waves are seen on ground surfaces. Lines of sight and level are distorted. Objects are thrown upward into the air.	1957 Mongolia; 1960 Valdivia; 2023 Turkey–Syria

=== Correlation with magnitude ===
Magnitude	Typical Maximum Modified Mercalli Intensity
1.0–1.9	I-II
2.0–2.9	II–III
3.0–3.9	III–V
4.0–4.9	IV–VI
5.0–5.9	VI–VII
6.0-6.9	VII-IX
7.0 and higher	VIII or higher
Magnitude/intensity comparison, USGS

Magnitude and intensity, while related, are very different concepts. Magnitude is a function of the energy liberated by an earthquake, while intensity is the degree of shaking experienced at a point on the surface, and varies from some maximum intensity at or near the epicentre, out to zero at distance. It depends upon many factors, including the depth of the hypocentre, terrain, distance from the epicentre, whether the underlying strata there amplify surface shaking, and any directionality due to the earthquake mechanism. For example, a magnitude 8.2 quake between La Paz and Beni Departments, Bolivia, in 1994, that was 631.3 km deep, had a maximum felt intensity of VI, while a magnitude 2.2 event in Barrow-in-Furness, England, in 1865, about 1 km deep, had a maximum felt intensity of VIII, despite the magnitude 8.2 earthquake releasing 1,000,000,000 times more energy than the magnitude 2.2 earthquake.

The small table is a rough guide to the degrees of the MMI scale. The colours and descriptive names shown here differ from those used on certain shake maps in other articles.

=== Estimating site intensity and its use in seismic hazard assessment ===
Dozens of intensity-prediction equations have been published to estimate the macroseismic intensity at a location given the magnitude, source-to-site distance, and perhaps other parameters (e.g. local site conditions). These are similar to ground motion-prediction equations for the estimation of instrumental strong-motion parameters such as peak ground acceleration. A summary of intensity prediction equations is available. Such equations can be used to estimate the seismic hazard in terms of macroseismic intensity, which has the advantage of being related more closely to seismic risk than instrumental strong-motion parameters.

=== Correlation with physical quantities ===
The MMI scale is not defined in terms of more rigorous, objectively quantifiable measurements such as shake amplitude, shake frequency, peak velocity, or peak acceleration. Human-perceived shaking and building damage are best correlated with peak acceleration for lower-intensity events, and with peak velocity for higher-intensity events.

=== Comparison to the moment magnitude scale ===
The effects of any one earthquake can vary greatly from place to place, so many MMI values may be measured for the same earthquake. These values can be displayed best using a contoured map of equal intensity, known as an isoseismal map. However, each earthquake has only one magnitude.

== See also ==
- European macroseismic scale
- Japan Meteorological Agency seismic intensity scale (Shindo scale)
- Rohn emergency scale
- Seismic intensity scales
- Seismic magnitude scales
- Spectral acceleration
- Strong ground motion
