= List of earthquakes in Kazakhstan =

This list includes seismic events with epicenters that located within the Kazakhstan territory.

== List ==
Date and time (UTC)	Location	Epicenter	Mag.	MMI	Depth	Notes	Casualties		Ref
Date and time (UTC)	Location	Epicenter	Mag.	MMI	Depth	Notes	Dead	Injured	Ref
2 August 1885; 14:20:00	Chüy Region, Kyrgyzstan	42.7°N 74.1°E	6.7–7.6 M_{w}	MMI X (Extreme)	15 km (9.3 mi)	Two villages from Kara-Balta and Belovodskoye were damaged, and 54 people were killed.	54	—	
8 June 1887; 04:35:00	Almaty Region, Kazakhstan	43.1°N 76.8°E	7.3–7.8 M_{w}	MMI X (Extreme)	20 km (12 mi)	At least 330 people were killed in the city of Verny.	330	—	
11 July 1889; 15:14:00	Almaty Region, Kazakhstan	43.2°N 78.7°E	7.9–8.0 M_{w}	MMI X (Extreme)	40 km (25 mi)	At least 92 people across Kazakhstan, Kyrgyzstan and China were killed.	92+	—	
4 January 1911; 05:25:48	Chüy Region, Kyrgyzstan	42.9°N 76.8°E	8.0 M_{w} 8.1 M_{s}	MMI X (Extreme)	20 km (12 mi)	452 people were killed and 740 others were injured. Nearly 1,100 houses and 4,545 yurts were destroyed by the earthquake and the resulting landslides.	452	740	
3 November 1946; 00:28:35	Jalal-Abad Region, Kyrgyzstan	41.757°N 71.854°E	7.5–7.6 M_{w}	MMI X (Extreme)	25 km (16 mi)	Severe property damage was reported in its aftermath, but the number of deaths and injuries remains unknown.	—	—	
5 June 1970; 04:53:06	Almaty Region, Kazakhstan	42.5°N 78.8°E	6.6 M_{s}	—	20 km (12 mi)	The earthquake destroyed at least 5,000 buildings and left more than 20,000 people homeless.	—	—	
10 May 1971; 19:51:46	Jambyl Region, Kazakhstan	42.887°N 71.267°E	5.3 M_{w}	—	17.8 km (11.1 mi)	More than 28,000 buildings and structures, including 16,500 private houses were damaged.	—	—	
25 March 1978; 02:05:48	Issyk-Kul Region, Kyrgyzstan	42.839°N 78.606°E	7.1 M_{w}	MMI VII (Very strong)	33 km (21 mi)	—	—	—	
14 June 1990; 17:47:28	East Kazakhstan Region, Kazakhstan	47.869°N 78.606°E	6.6 M_{w}	MMI VI (Strong)	57.9 km (36.0 mi)	One person was killed in the earthquake. At least 3,000 buildings were destroyed and more than 20,000 people left homeless.	1	—	
3 August 1990; 14:15:06	East Kazakhstan Region, Kazakhstan	47.963°N 84.961°E	6.2 M_{w}	MMI VI (Strong)	33.4 km (20.8 mi)	Eight people were injured and at least 500 buildings were destroyed.	—	8	
28 September 1990; 02:12:32	East Kazakhstan Region, Kazakhstan	47.903°N 84.961°E	5.0 M_{w}	MMI VI (Strong)	33.4 km (20.8 mi)	Some buildings were damaged in Zaisan.	—	—	
19 August 1992; 08:04:37	Jalal-Abad Region, Kyrgyzstan	42.142°N 73.575°E	7.3 M_{s}	MMI IX (Violent)	27.4 km (17.0 mi)	75 people were killed, including 14 by landslides.	75	—	
1 December 2003; 06:38:31	Almaty Region, Kazakhstan	42.905°N 80.515°E	6.1 M_{s} 6.0 M_{w}	MMI VIII (Severe)	15 km (9.3 mi)	Eleven people were killed in the earthquake, with 73 others injured, 26 of them seriously.	11	73	
13 June 2009; 17:17:38	Jetisu Region, Kazakhstan	44.724°N 78.864°E	5.8 mb 5.4 M_{w} 5.1 M_{s}	—	15 km (9.3 mi)	One person died of a heart attack and several buildings damaged in the city of Tekeli.	1	—	
23 January 2024; 23:09:04	Xinjiang, China	41.269°N 78.649°E	7.1 M_{s} 7.0 M_{w}	MMI IX (Violent)	13 km (8.1 mi)	Sixty-seven people were injured; three of whom were hospitalized. At least 44 buildings throughout Almaty Region were damaged.	3	74	
4 March 2024; 12:22:07	Issyk-Kul Region, Kazakhstan	42.836°N 76.897°E	4.7 M_{w}	MMI VI (Strong)	28.3 km (17.6 mi)	One person injured and several buildings damaged in Almaty, Kazakhstan.	—	1	
