= 2024 Uqturpan earthquake =

Earthquake in China

- Location within Xinjiang Location within Kyrgyzstan
- UTC time: 2024-01-22 18:09:04
- ISC event: 636644404
- USGS-ANSS: ComCat
- Local date: 23 January 2024
- Local time: 02:09 CST
- Magnitude: 7.1 M_{s} 7.0 M_{w}
- Depth: 13 km (8.1 mi)
- Epicenter: 41.269°N 78.649°E
- Areas affected: China, Kazakhstan, Kyrgyzstan, Russia
- Total damage: ¥3.79 billion (US$527 million)
- Max. intensity: CSIS IX (MMI IX)
- Aftershocks: 4,200 (9 ≥M_{w}5.0)
- Casualties: 3 fatalities, 74 injuries (7 in China and 67 in Kazakhstan)

On 23 January 2024, at 02:09 CST (18:09 UTC on 22 January), a M_{s}7.1 or M_{w}7.0 earthquake occurred in Uqturpan County, also known as Wushi County, in Xinjiang, China, near the border with Kyrgyzstan. Three people died in Xinjiang, while 74 others were injured, mostly in neighbouring Kazakhstan.

== Tectonic setting ==
The earthquake was located in the fold and thrust belt of the Tien Shan mountains. This region is tectonically controlled largely by the collision of India into Asia. The epicentral region is characterized by numerous east-northeast trending reverse faults and left-lateral strike-slip faults and intermontane basins.

The area where the earthquake occurred is seismically active, although earthquakes with a magnitude of 7.0 or larger are infrequent. In the preceding 100 years, there were three events above M 6.5 within 250 km of the 22 January event, with the largest being a M 7.1 event in 1978, approximately 200 km to the north. In 1911, the M 8.0 Kebin earthquake occurred nearly 250 km to the northwest of the 22 January event, near the modern border between Kyrgyzstan and Kazakhstan. The Kebin earthquake killed more than 450 people and caused extensive damage in the region.

== Earthquake ==
ECDM map

The earthquake occurred as a result of oblique reverse and strike-slip faulting. The rupture had an area of 51 km (32 mi) × 28 km (17 mi), and occurred on either a moderately dipping oblique reverse and right-lateral fault striking east, or a steeply dipping oblique reverse and left-lateral fault striking west. The China Earthquake Networks Center gave the earthquake a magnitude of M_{s}7.1, while the United States Geological Survey said the earthquake measured M_{ww}7.0. It struck at 02:09 CST (18:09 UTC) at a depth of 13 kilometers (8.1 miles). The epicenter was located in a mountainous area with an average altitude of about 3,048 meters.

At least 4,200 aftershocks were recorded, at least 70 of which measured above M_{w}3.0. A M_{w}5.8 aftershock occurred at 02:14 CST (18:14 UTC), followed by a M_{w}5.5 event 28 minutes later and another aftershock measuring M_{w}5.0 at 02:50 CST (18:50 UTC). Another quake measuring M_{w}5.5 struck at 03:36 CST (19:36 UTC), followed by a M_{w}5.6 event at 07:19 CST (23:19 UTC). Another M_{w}5.7 aftershock occurred on 29 January.

=== Intensity ===
According to the USGS' PAGER service, the earthquake had a maximum Modified Mercalli intensity of IX (Violent), and that 227,000 people were exposed to damaging shaking intensities above VI (Strong). The tremors were felt across Xinjiang, including in Tacheng, Ürümqi, Hotan, Kashgar, Korla and Yining. It was also felt as far away as neighbouring Kazakhstan and Kyrgyzstan, forcing residents of Almaty and Bishkek into the streets, as well as in Uzbekistan and Delhi, India. In Kazakhstan, the MSK-64 intensity was estimated at V in Almaty and II in Shymkent. In Jeti-Ögüz District of Issyk-Kul Region in Kyrgyzstan, the MSK-64 intensity was VI.

== Impact ==
=== China ===
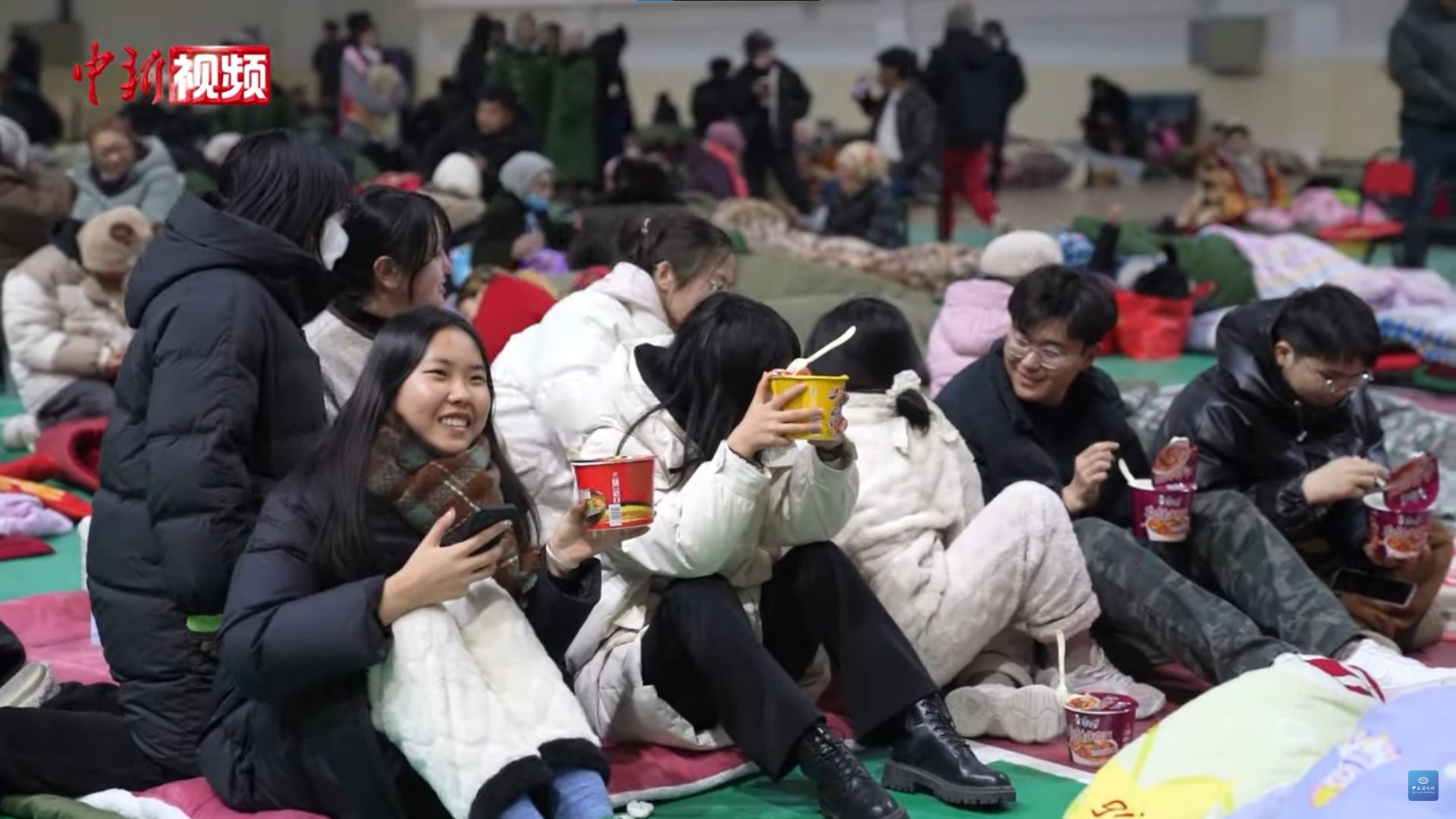
People living in shelters after earthquake

Three people died in Akqi County while 9,632 others were displaced. The fatalities were identified as ethnic Kyrgyz. Six people were injured, 47 homes collapsed and another 78 were damaged. Two of the injured were described to be in serious condition. Overall, at least 210 homes collapsed and 8,079 others sustained damage in the affected areas. In Kizilsu Kyrgyz Autonomous Prefecture, where Akqi County is located, 93 buildings collapsed, 851 others were damaged, and 910 livestock animals were killed. A total of 18,346 people across Xinjiang were also displaced. Casualties were minimal as the earthquake occurred in a sparsely populated area. The Chinese government estimated the total damage to be ¥3.79 billion (US$527 million).

In Uqturpan County, one person was injured in Yingate, over 900 sheds collapsed and 1,000 houses and a bridge were damaged. Two major power lines were downed in the county, although electricity was quickly restored. According to authorities, most collapsed homes were located in rural areas and were constructed by its residents whereas newly-constructed government housing did not collapse.

=== Kazakhstan ===
Four incoming flights were delayed at Almaty International Airport; one Air Astana flight was diverted to Turkistan while the others landed safely. Sixty-seven people were injured; three of whom were hospitalized. At least 44 buildings throughout Almaty Oblast were damaged.

=== Kyrgyzstan ===
At least 100 buildings were damaged across the country. Several landslides and rockfalls were reported on the road between Bishkek and Torugart.

=== Russia ===
In Kurgan, at least two buildings were damaged and 246 people were evacuated.

== Aftermath ==
The earthquake occurred amid below-freezing temperatures in the region that reached −10°C (14°F). Temperatures further fell to −20°C (−4°F) which hampered rescuers as they tried to reach rural areas. Two thousand rescue workers, 152 vehicles and 32 search dogs were deployed to the epicenter region to rescue potential victims. The Ministry of Emergency Management sent 1,000 tents, 5,000 winter coats, 5,000 blankets, 5,000 cotton-padded mattresses, 5,000 folding bed and 1,000 heating stoves to Uqturpan county for disaster relief and placed rescue teams in neighboring Tibet Autonomous Region and Gansu province on standby. At least 10,000 of these items arrived at the disaster zone by noon. The Chinese government announced that it would release 30 million yuan ($4.23 million) in disaster relief funds. The China National Space Administration mobilized its Gaofen satellites to relay images of the disaster zone for analysis by relevant agencies.

Railway authorities in Xinjiang closed off railroads in the affected areas and suspended 27 trains before resuming services at 07:00 following safety checks. Schools in the region and in Kazakhstan were closed to allow students to recover. More than 40 industrial enterprises were temporarily closed in Uqturqan County following the earthquake for safety reasons.

== See also ==
- List of earthquakes in 2024
- List of earthquakes in China
- List of earthquakes in Kyrgyzstan
- List of earthquakes in Kazakhstan
- 1902 Turkestan earthquake
