= 1889 Chilik earthquake =

Earthquake affecting Central Asia

- Location within Kazakhstan Location within Kyrgyzstan
- UTC time: 1889-07-11 22:14:00
- Local date: 11 July 1889
- Local time: 15:14
- Magnitude: M_{w} 7.9–8.0
- Depth: 40 km (25 mi)
- Epicenter: 43.2°N 78.7°E
- Areas affected: Kazakhstan, Kyrgyzstan & China
- Max. intensity: MSK-64 X (Devastating)
- Casualties: 92+ dead

The 1889 Chilik earthquake occurred on July 11 on the Gregorian calendar, or June 30 on the Julian calendar at 15:14 local time in the Tien Shan mountains. The earthquake measured an estimated M_{w} 7.9–8.0 on the moment magnitude scale and was assigned a maximum intensity of X (Devastating) on the MSK 64 and Rossi-Forel scales. At least 92 people across Kazakhstan, Kyrgyzstan and China were killed.

== Tectonic setting ==
The geological forces at play in the Turkestan region are directly related to the ongoing collision of the Indian Plate with the Eurasian Plate. The topography of this region is influenced by broad crustal deformation as a result of convergence along the Main Himalayan Thrust. Before the Indian subcontinent collided with Eurasia, there were island arcs and microcontinents between the two landmasses that were also converging. These terranes were later accreted to Eurasia as northward-moving India closed collided with Eurasia, and are now in present-day Central Asia. Ancient suture zones mark the boundary between these accreted terranes. This deformation and accretion led to the formation of the Tien Shan mountains, which are moving 7±2 mm/yr towards the south along faults running along their base. The region is dominated by large, north and south-dipping thrust faults along the southern edge of the Tien Shan mountains, and the northern boundary of the Tarim basin, one of them being the Aheqi Fault Zone.

== Earthquake ==
A post-earthquake survey of the region using reports of the earthquake's damage and effects led to the conclusion that the epicenter was located in the Chilik River Valley. No surface ruptures were identified during the survey as data was obtained via questionnaire given to eyewitnesses. The epicenter zone is elongated in the north northeast–south southwest direction approximately 100 km southwest of Almaty.

The length of surface ruptures associated with the earthquake is estimated at 200–300 km, with an average slip of 6.7–9.1 meters for an event consisting of thrust and strike-slip mechanisms. A 30-km-long scarp on the Saty Fault, an oblique-reverse structure is assumed to have formed during the 1889 earthquake. Dextral surface ruptures were also identified on the Beshkaragai Fault for a length of 40 km, where a maximum slip of 4.5 meters was observed. Another 100 km surface rupture was identified near the summits of the Kurmentey Range, a subrange in the Tien Shan. The surface ruptures consisted of dextral strike-slip motion of at least 8 meters.

In 2016, a field study of the epicenter area only identified 175 km of visible surface ruptures. Given the earthquake only had a maximum intensity assigned X on the Rossi-Forel scale, and its broad coverage over a wide area, the hypocenter depth is estimated to be at least 40 km beneath the surface. Because of its deep depth, much of the coseismic rupture is thought to be buried beneath the surface. A conversion of the intensity to the MSK 64 by two journals in 1993 and 2003 suggest it was IX–X (Very destructive–Devastating).

Another possible reason for the lack of surface ruptures is because the earthquake ruptured a neighbouring fault system in a complex rupture sequence. Due to poor accessibility for researchers, those areas hosting possible surface ruptures have not been discovered.

Earlier calculation of the earthquake magnitude yielded an M_{s} magnitude of 8.3 in a publication by Ivan Mushketov.

Frank Krüger and others suggests the magnitude of the Chilik quake has been overestimated due to the lack of abundant surface ruptures for its claimed size. A typical earthquake of this size would imply ruptures of 200 to 300 km and an average offset of 6.7 meters. He added that earthquakes in the Tien Shan region are confined to shallow depths therefore a deeper source of 40 km is debatable. Despite this, the 1978 M_{w} 6.9 event in the same region is the only earthquake originating at a similar depth. His team proposed a slightly lower magnitude of 8.0 M_{w} by analyzing surface waves of a magnetogram at two locations in England. Another reassessment of the magnitude by Krüger in 2018 brought it down to 7.9.

== Impact ==
In the days before the mainshock, many survivors reported peculiar behaviors of animals, including dogs howling and cats being restless.

At Verny (now Almaty), the locals described the ground motion as a slow oscillation, rocking, wave-like motion. The earthquake was the most intense ever felt in the town since 1887. Shaking was so strong that many people and farm animals reportedly fell off their feet and were thrown off the ground by yards. Eyewitnesses reported seeing people thrown up into the air as much as one arshin (71.12 cm). The earthquake itself did not cause severe and widespread damage because new buildings were recently constructed following the 1887 earthquake. Official reports stated that 491 residents reported damage to their homes after the quake.

On the shores of Lake Issyk-Kul, severe shocks were reported. A tall lake tsunami occurred, flooding its western shore. Large fissures, liquefaction and bulging of the lakeshore was reported. Some cracks in the ground were up to five meters wide and a kilometer long. These cracks were deep and many times, one side was uplifted by 35 cm. The severe ground effects were observed extending into the mountains. Multiple landslides and avalanches occurred around the lake. Three rivers diverted their courses as well.

The report by Mushketov in 1891 documented a "seismic island"—a location in meizoseismal area where shaking was weaker or not felt at all. This seismic island is located on the eastern flanks of the Tarbagatai Mountains, or in the upper Irtysh River valley. No shaking was reported in the Lake Zaysan area as well.

== Damage ==
In Tüp (then Preobrajenskoe), a bridge over the Tyub River was shifted to the left bank by 1.5 meters. The quake demolished every structure made of stone and bricks. Eight people were killed in Oy-Tal, and two were seriously injured. The village was totally destroyed. In Cholpon-Ata, 39 deaths occurred, mainly due to rockfalls. Every single home; ~2,500 of them in Koram was destroyed. These clay-built homes killed 21 people when they collapsed. A nomad was buried under sand in Jyrgalang, and three 30–40-meter-long bridges fell into the Jyrgalang River. In these regions, the ground erupted tall fountains of water and sand, while in some areas, large fissures occurred.

The post office in Qoyankus was destroyed. Buildings partially collapsed or suffered extensive cracks in the walls. Avalanches and landslides near Zharkent caused serious damage; all state-owned buildings collapsed, as did ovens and chimneys. In the village of Uytala, there were seven recorded deaths, including an elderly man and six children. Four people suffered serious injuries. In Shelek (Chilik), Malovodnoye, and Mikhailovsk, the earthquake collapsed walls and brought down roofs, killing 17 people.

Damage to wood-constructed homes at Talgar was minimal. Only a few homes suffered a collapsed chimney in Verny. Many clay and daub homes were destroyed in Shuiding, killing an unknown number of people only described as "many" by Mushketov. Mushketov reported the effects in Yining County as the same as in Shuiding.

In Teploklyuchenka, Kyrgyzstan, 124 homes were demolished. One-seventh of all structures in Kyzyl-Suu were damaged.

== See also ==
- List of earthquakes in Kyrgyzstan
- List of earthquakes in China
- List of historical earthquakes
