= Rudnichny =

Rudnichny (masculine), Rudnichnaya (feminine), or Rudnichnoye (neuter) may refer to:

- Rudnichny City District, name of several city districts in Russia
- Rudnichny, Russia (Rudnichnaya, Rudnichnoye), name of several inhabited localities in Russia
- Rudnichny, Kazakhstan
- Rudnichnoye, a lake in Kazakhstan
