= Kyzylkungei Hydroelectric Power Plant =

Hydroelectric power plant in Almaty, Kazakhstan

Kyzylkungei Hydroelectric Power Plant is a hydroelectric power plant on the Koksu River in Rudnichny village, Koksu District, in Almaty Province, Kazakhstan.
