= 10 let Kasakhstan =

- village
- Location within Kazakhstan
- Coordinates: 44°53′32″N 78°7′53″E
- Country: Kazakhstan
- Region: Almaty Region
- District: Koksu District

Population (2009)
  - Total: 263
- Time zone: UTC+7

10 let Kasakhstan (Kazakh: Қазақстанға 10 жыл Russian: 10 лет Казахстана) is a village located in the Koksu District of Almaty Region in southeastern Kazakhstan. Population: 263 (2009 census results).
