= Balpyk Bi =

Balpyk Bi Балпық
- settlement
- Location in Kazakhstan
- Coordinates: 44°53′41″N 78°12′30″E
- Country: Kazakhstan
- Region: Jetisu Region
- District: Koksu District

Population (2009)
  - Total: 12,654
- Time zone: UTC+6 (Omsk Time)
- Postal code: 041200
- Area code: 72838

Balpyk Bi (Kazakh: Балпық би, Balpyq Bi) is a settlement and capital of Koksu District in Jetisu Region of south-eastern Kazakhstan. It is named after the 18-century Kazakh military hero Balpyk Derbisaliuly. Population: 12,654 (2009 census results); 12,145 (1999 census results).

Located on the Koksu River, the Kyzylbulak Hydroelectric Power Plant is located in the area.
