= 1946 Chatkal earthquake =

Earthquake in Kyrgyzstan

- Location within Kyrgyzstan Location within Kazakhstan Location within Uzbekistan
- UTC time: 1946-11-02 18:28:35
- ISC event: 898647
- USGS-ANSS: ComCat
- Local date: 3 November 1946
- Local time: 00:28 KGT
- Magnitude: 7.5–7.6 M_{w}
- Depth: 25.0 km (15.5 mi)
- Epicenter: 41.757°N 71.854°E
- Fault: Talas-Fergana Fault
- Type: Thrust
- Areas affected: Kyrgyzstan, Kazakhstan and Uzbekistan
- Max. intensity: MMI X (Extreme) MSK-64 IX (Destructive)
- Landslides: Yes
- Aftershocks: Yes
- Casualties: Unknown

On November 2 of 1946, west Kyrgyzstan (then the Kirghiz Soviet Socialist Republic in the Soviet Union) was struck by a magnitude 7.5–7.6 earthquake, the largest in the republic since 1911. The earthquake's hypocenter is probably located beneath the Tian Shan Mountains, near the border with Uzbekistan and north of Namangan.

The earthquake had a maximum intensity of X (Extreme) on the Mercalli intensity scale, and IX on the MSK scale. This shock rocked the entire country and Tian Shan range. Severe property damage was reported in its aftermath, but the number of deaths and injuries remains unknown. It has been considered one of the most devastating earthquakes in Central Asia.

Two days later, a magnitude 6.9 earthquake struck nearby Turkmenistan, killing 400 people.

== Tectonic setting ==
The Talas-Fergana Fault is a massive 800 kilometers (500 miles) intracontinental strike-slip fault running through the Tian Shan Mountains, the largest in Central Asia. It has produced several significant earthquakes with magnitude 7.0 or greater in the past 6000 years with recurrence intervals on segments of the fault between 145 and 850 years, and an average of 375 years. Earlier studies and research on this event concluded that the earthquake occurred on a secondary branch of this fault known as the Atoinok Thrust Fault.

== Effects ==
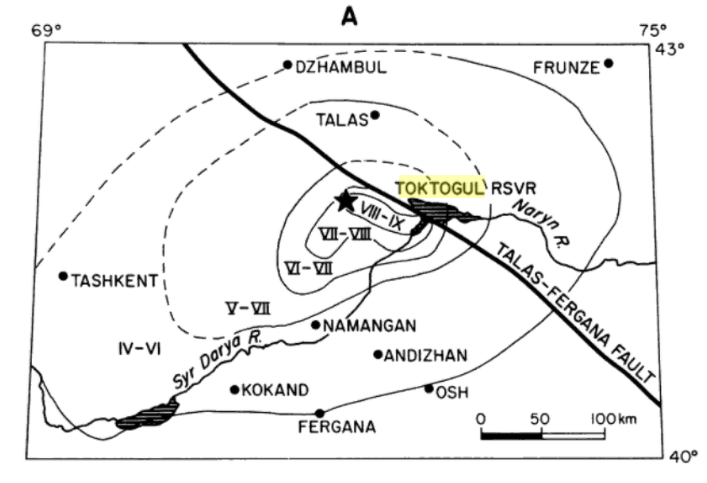
Isoseismal map of the 1946 Chatkal, Kyrgyzstan earthquake. The greatest intensity lie parallel to the Talas-Fergana Fault.

Man-made structures within a 1,500 square kilometers (580 square miles) area around the epicenter were completely destroyed. The villages of Shuduger, Kichitovar, and Chontovar were severely damaged or totally destroyed. Intensity X to VIII was evaluated to occupy an area perpendicular to the Chatkal Range, and parallel to the fault. The meizoseismal area, however, was parallel to the Talas-Fergana Fault, indicating most of the seismic energy was released parallel to the fault instead.

Landslides, loams and rockfalls dammed rivers. A rockfall dammed the Naryn river, forming a quake lake. This threatened the small community of Toktogul with a possibility of the rockfall dam breaching, causing a surge.

Surface ruptures up to 300 meters (980 feet) long and 50 meters (160 feet) wide fissured the landscape.

The earthquake's strength was also felt in Osh and Tashkent, Uzbekistan where the shaking intensity was VI (Strong) to IV (Light), causing substantial damage to buildings.

== Aftershocks ==
Numerous aftershocks continued throughout the region. The largest included a magnitude 5.5 and 5.4 in 1955 and 1959. Another magnitude 5.6 struck near Toktogul Reservoir on October 28, 1971.

== See also ==
- List of earthquakes in 1946
- List of earthquakes in Kyrgyzstan
- List of earthquakes in Russia
