= Kyzylbulak Hydroelectric Power Plant =

Hydroelectric power station in Almaty, Kazakhstan

Kyzylbulak Hydroelectric Power Plant is a hydroelectric power plant in Balpyk Bi, Koksu District, in Almaty Province, Kazakhstan. It is located on the Koksu River.
