= List of earthquakes in Kyrgyzstan =

The following is a list documenting major earthquakes that have occurred in Kyrgyzstan. The list also include earthquakes with epicenters outside the country, but caused significant impact in Kyrgyzstan.

== List ==
Date	Location	Magnitude	MMI	Deaths	Total damage / notes	Ref.
1885-08-02	Belovodski, Kyrgyzstan	7.6 M_{w}	X	54		
1887-06-08	Verny, Kazakhstan	7.7 M_{w}	X	300	All adobe houses in Verny destroyed.	
1889-07-11	Chilik, Kazakhstan	7.9 M_{w}	X	Unk.		
1902-08-22	Kyrgyzstan-Xinjiang border region	7.7 M_{w}	XI	5,000+	Major damage in Xinjiang.	
1911-01-03	Issyk Kul, Kazakhstan-Kyrgyzstan border region	7.7 M_{w}	X	450	Major damage and many injured.	
1946-11-02	Askay, Kyrgyzstan	7.5 M_{w}	X	Unk.	Major damage reported and an unspecified number of casualties.	
1974-08-11	Kyrgyzstan-Tajikistan-Xinjiang border region	7.3 M_{s}	VIII	Unk.		
1978-03-24	Almaty, Kazakhstan	7.1 M_{s}	VIII	0	Some damage reported. Seiches in Issyk-Kul.	
1985-08-23	Ulugqat, Xinjiang	7.0 M_{w}	VII	71	US$5 million in damages.	
1987-01-24	Kyrgyzstan-Xinjiang border region	6.2 M_{w}	VII	0	More than 417 homes in Uqturpan County damaged.	
1992-05-15	eastern Uzbekistan	6.2 M_{s}	VII	3	At least 5,500 homes destroyed and another 4,000 over damaged.	
1992-08-19	Suusamyr, Kyrgyzstan	7.3 M_{wb}	IX	75		
1996-03-19	Artux, Xinjiang	6.3 M_{wc}	VI	24	Over 15,300 homes destroyed. At least 128 injured.	
2003-02-24	Maralbexi, Xinjiang	6.3 M_{wc}	VIII	261	4,000 injured and over 70,000 buildings collapsed in Xinjiang.	
2005-02-14	Kyrgyzstan-Xinjiang border region	6.1 M_{wc}	VII	0	6,000 homes destroyed or damaged.	
2008-10-05	Nura, Kyrgyzstan	6.7 M_{wc}	VII	75	Damage in Xinjiang.	
2011-07-19	Uzbekistan-Kyrgyzstan-Tajikistan border region	6.1 M_{w}	VIII	14	No deaths in Kyrgyzstan.	
