= Balpyk Derbisaliuly =

Kazakh military figure

Balpyk Derbisaliuly (1705–1780) was a Kazakh military figure. Born in Koksu District in Almaty Province, the Kazakh people named him "Yegiz bi", meaning "twin judges". He was a prominent figure during the Dzungar invasions in Kazakhstan, and headed the Zhalaiyir tribe.

Today the district capital of Koksu District is named after him, Balpyk Bi.
