= Talapty Settlement =

The Talapty Settlement Talapty Settlement
- excavations, non- residential settlement
- Interactive map of The Talapty Settlement

The Talapty Settlement is located in the western part of the Zhetysu (Dzungar) Alatau, the valley of the Koksu River, and the right bank from the gorge number 8 to the gorge number 10. The Talapty Settlement is an ancient city of the 4th century BC. The Talapty Settlement discovered in 1982, and three years later, the excavations began under the guidance of doctor of historical Sciences, Professor A. N. Maryashev.

== Conditions of formation ==
The settlement of the Koksu valley began in the 4th century BC according to the numerous of archaeological sites of Zhetysu (Dzungar) Alatau and its spurs. The main part of the valley developed later, at the turn of the late II-early I Millennium BC. Life continued here in the early Iron Age, in the Middle Ages and in modern times. Petroglyphs also belong to the periods of settlement. Traces of various civilizations embodied in the rock art that is widely represented in this region. Archaeologists continue to find many artifacts today.

On the surface of the ancient city, there found stone layouts that had a rectangular shape. Later, the remains of grain grinders and stone pestles collected. Most of the village washed away by the river, but the remaining land was paved with several stone half- earthen houses and one house, which measured 16 by 18 m, and had a depth of 1 m. The entrance to the house shaped like a letter "G". There is a hearth of the rectangular shape, a size of 2.4 x 2.2 m. Pits dug from the rectangular hearth to the East. Presumably, one of the pits was a storage (storage place) and evenly lined with stones. Another of the pits filled with animal bones and the remains of broken dishes that were garbage. Along the Northern wall there was a large stone walls with a length of 15 m and a width of 1.6 m. On the territory of the settlement found stone pestles, pieces of copper ore, bone arrowheads leaf-shaped, veneers, tubes, bone punctures, polished stones with grooves for tying the rope. To catch animals, they used a bolas (a rope weighted with stones) that tied the animal's legs. At the entrance to the dwelling, many other household items found on the floor: knife plates, hoes, sharpeners and stone knives.
