= Sumbe (ancient settlement) =

Sumbe is an ancient settlement in the Almaty region, Kazakhstan.

== History ==
The city of Laban is mentioned in Muslim written sources of the 10th century. There is an assumption that it should be identified with the Sumba settlement on the Northern slopes of Ketmentau. Excavations at the site were conducted in the 1960s under the direction of K. A. Akishev. The area of the settlement was determined, the structure of city fortifications was studied, a complex of material culture of the 9th to 10th centuries was identified – ceramic dishes, items of local handicraft production, and imported products were also found. The walls had typical cities of Semirechye design, initially at a distance of 3 m from each other were constructed of two parallel stone walls with a height of 2 m, the clutch was used large rounded stones, bonded with clay mortar, the space between them were filled with clay, and above the wall was built up with layers of clay with thickness up to 20 cm Clay taken on both sides of the wall, but mostly outside, resulting in front of the wall formed a moat. The city was medium-sized, with no more than 2,200 inhabitants. The city was located on the caravan route that ran along the left Bank of the ili valley from Talkhiz (Talgar) through the settlements of Issyk, Chilik to the settlement of Sumba and then to Almalyk.

== Description ==
In our time, a large ring-shaped settlement has been preserved from the monument with low slumped fortress walls 3 m high and 6 m wide. the diameter of the settlement is about 500 m.

Among the local veterans, this monument is known as Kalmak Seipel (‘Kalmyk fortress’). According to local legends, "Kalmaks" (i.e. Oirats) lived here before the return of the Kazakhs to their native lands, who, according to the residents of the village of Sumba, built the former fortification in the past. Currently, there are residential buildings and vegetable gardens on the territory of the settlement. In the village school, the history room contains archaeological items found by local residents during various economic activities on the territory of the settlement. There is also an old cemetery on the territory of Sumba village. It is located in the upper part of the village, on the left Bank of the river. There are memorials on the graves of Muslims and Orthodox residents of the village of the late 19th and early 20th century. on the Western edge of the cemetery, a half-buried millstone with an epitaph and the dates 1915, 1933 is set as a tombstone in the hillside.

== Preservation of the monument ==
The monument is under state protection, included in the State list of historical and cultural monuments of local significance of Almaty region in 2010 (No. 1491). There is no physical protection of the monument on the site, a significant part of the territory of the settlement is occupied by vegetable gardens and houses of local residents. The Northern section of the fortress wall is well preserved.

== Location of the object ==
Almaty Region, Uygur District, a. Sumba, on the left Bank of the Sumba river, at the foot of the Ketmen mountains (Northern Tien Shan).

== Sources ==
- Baypakov K. M. Medieval Urban Culture of Southern Kazakhstan and Semirechye (Sixth to beginning of the Thirteenth Century). Alma-ATA, 1986.
- Erofeeva I. V. Buddhist Monasteries of the Oirats in Semirechye (Mid-Seventeenth – Mid-Nineteenth Century) / / Mongolia–XVIII. St. Petersburg: St. Petersburg Oriental Studies, 2017. Pp. 35-47.
