= Vít Kárník =

Czech geogphysicist (1926–1994)

Vít Kárník (5 October 1926 in Prague – 31 January 1994 in Prague) was a Czech geophysicist and seismologist. He and Wilhelm Sponheuer developed the Medvedev–Sponheuer–Karnik scale (MSK-scale) for measurement of intensity of earthquakes with Sergei Medvedev and in scale described magnitude of epicentric points. He was the head of the seismology department at Institute of Geophysics of the Czech Academy of Sciences during the 1950s.

== Moscow-Prague formula ==
$$M_\mathrm{S} = \log_{10}\left({A \over T}\right)_{\max} + \sigma\left(\Delta\right) = \log_{10}\left({A \over T}\right)_{\max} + 1{,}66 \log_{10}\Delta + 3{,}3$$

max. depth 50 km
