= 1887 Verny earthquake =

Earthquake in Kazakhstan

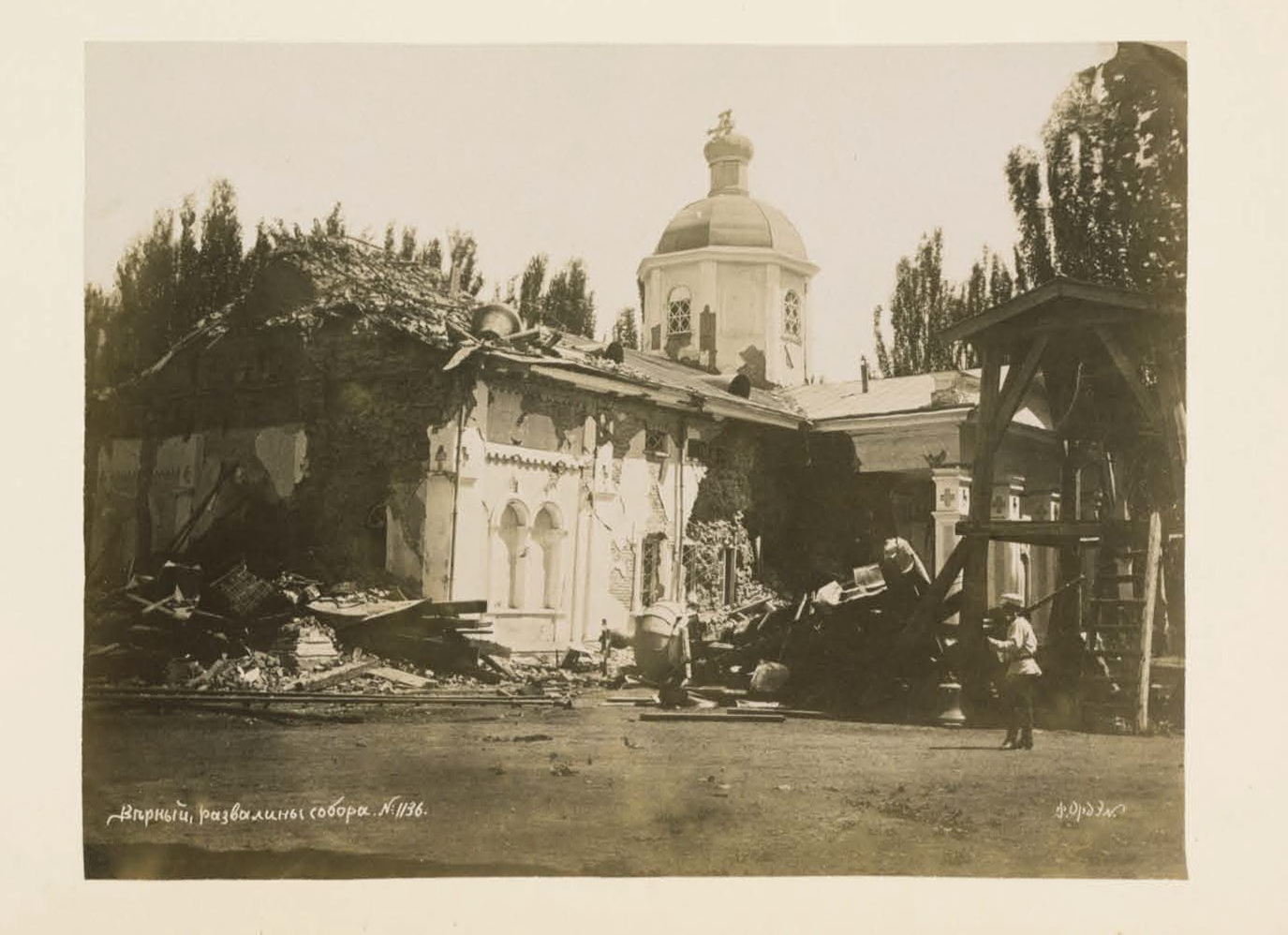
- Ruins of a cathedral after the earthquake

- Location within Kazakhstan
- UTC time: 1887-06-07
- Local date: 8 June 1887
- Local time: 04:35
- Magnitude: M_{w} 7.3–7.8
- Depth: 20 km (12 mi)
- Epicenter: 43.1°N 76.8°E
- Areas affected: Kazakhstan, Kyrgyzstan
- Max. intensity: MSK-64 X (Devastating)
- Foreshocks: 1
- Aftershocks: 250
- Casualties: 330 dead

The 1887 Verny earthquake occurred on June 8 at 04:35 local time in Russian Turkestan (in present-day Kazakhstan). It had an epicenter in the northern foothills of the Trans-Ili Alatau mountain range, or just south of the city of Verny, then the administrative centre of Russia's Semirechye Oblast. This earthquake destroyed the city of Verny, killing at least 330 people. A moment magnitude of 7.3–7.7 and MSK 64 intensity of X (Devastating) has been estimated for the earthquake.

== Tectonic setting ==
The geological forces at play in the Turkestan region are directly related to the ongoing collision of the Indian Plate with the Eurasian Plate. The topography of this region is influenced by broad crustal deformation as a result of convergence along the Main Himalayan Thrust. Before the Indian subcontinent collided with Eurasia, there were island arcs and microcontinents between the two landmasses that were also converging. These terranes were later accreted to Eurasia as northward-moving India closed collided with Eurasia, and are now in present-day Central Asia. Ancient suture zones mark the boundary between these accreted terranes. This deformation and accretion led to the formation of the Tien Shan mountains, which are moving 7±2 mm/yr towards the south along faults running along their base. The region is dominated by large, north and south-dipping thrust faults along the southern edge of the Tien Shan mountains, and the northern boundary of the Tarim basin, one of them being the Aheqi Fault Zone.

== Earthquake ==
The earthquake was felt over an area of 2,000,000 km^{2}, but severe ground effects were observed approximately for 2,000 km^{2}. In the meizoseismal area, the northern foothills of the Trans-Ili Alatau (part of the Tien Shan), the maximum MSK 64 intensity was evaluated at IX to X. In Verny, the earthquake was felt with an intensity of IX. Based on analyzing the seismic intensity of the earthquake through isoseismal maps, the moment magnitude of this earthquake was determined to fall within the range of 7.3 and 7.8 M_{w}. A focal depth of 20 km was estimated.

Thrust faulting was the cause of the earthquake, likely associated with a structure lying under the Trans-Ili Alatau mountains. It did not produce any surface rupture, thus classifying it as a blind thrust earthquake. Surface evidence of faults lying under the Trans-Ili Alatau mountains are sparse and sometimes absent due to the fast erosion occurring, or do not break to the surface. Due to the absence of surface ruptures, it is not clear if the earthquake rupture faults on the foothills or within the mountain range.

== Impact ==
In the meizoseismal area, large landslides merged into a single mudflow. In the Talgar Valley, two landslides occurred with a total estimated volume of 500 m^{3}. Shaking corresponded to intensity VI, causing the destruction of 265 of the 576 homes in Talgar. In Verny, of the 1,799 brick structures in the city, only one was left standing. Wood-constructed buildings, however, remained intact. Many previously intact buildings collapsed during the at least 250 aftershocks that rocked the region.

At least 332 people were killed in the city of Verny. Of which, 161 people died (118 of them children) in Bolshoi-Almatinskaya and Malo-Almatinskaya villages. Fourteen people, four soldiers and ten prisoners, were killed at a barrack. Landslides were triggered in the mountains, killing 154 people, 87 of them were Kyrgyz.

== See also ==
- List of earthquakes in Kyrgyzstan
- List of historical earthquakes
