= Shelek =

Shelek Шелек
- Village
- Location in Kazakhstan
- Coordinates: 43°35′50″N 78°15′04″E
- Country: Kazakhstan
- Region: Almaty Region
- District: Enbekshikazakh District

Population (2009)
  - Total: 26,688
- Time zone: UTC+5 (Time in Kazakhstan)
- Postal code: 040462
- Area code: 72776

Shelek (Kazakh: Шелек, Şelek), formerly Chilik, is a town in Almaty Region of south-eastern Kazakhstan. Administrative center of Shelek rural district, it is located in the Chilik river valley and is about 69 km north-east of the center of Esik. The KATO code is 194083100.

== History ==
The settlement was founded in 1871 as the village of Chilik.

In 1889, the 1889 Chilik earthquake caused severe damage.

It was Zaitsevsky, from 1932 to May 1997 and was the administrative center of the Chilik region. On May 23, 1997, the Chilik district was abolished and incorporated into the Enbekshikazakh district. Prior to 1997, Shelek was the regional center of the Chilik district of the Almaty region, which became part of the Enbekshikazakh district with the center in the city of Esik.

== Etymology ==
The Kazakh word "shelek" translated into Russian means "bucket", but scientists believe it to be a coincidence. The name of the village comes from the name of the river Chilik (Shelek in Kazakh). In folk etymology (according to local residents) the name of the river comes from the Kazakh word "shilik", which means willow or willow growth. However, some scientists believe that the name may come from the word "people", an ancient Kazakh word for "wind". Doctor of Philology Telkoz Zhanuzakov believes that the name consists of the ancient Türkic word "walked" (source, spring, water) and the end of "-ek", which could mean "a river that originates from springs".

== Climate ==
Shelek has a semi-arid climate (Köppen: BSk) with cold winters and hot summers.

Climate data for Shelek (1991–2020)
Month	Jan	Feb	Mar	Apr	May	Jun	Jul	Aug	Sep	Oct	Nov	Dec	Year
Mean daily maximum °C (°F)	−1.6 (29.1)	2.2 (36.0)	11.5 (52.7)	20.0 (68.0)	25.4 (77.7)	30.5 (86.9)	32.5 (90.5)	31.5 (88.7)	26.0 (78.8)	17.9 (64.2)	8.4 (47.1)	0.6 (33.1)	17.1 (62.8)
Daily mean °C (°F)	−5.8 (21.6)	−2.7 (27.1)	5.3 (41.5)	13.3 (55.9)	18.5 (65.3)	23.4 (74.1)	25.3 (77.5)	24.0 (75.2)	18.6 (65.5)	11.0 (51.8)	3.0 (37.4)	−3.4 (25.9)	10.9 (51.6)
Mean daily minimum °C (°F)	−9.0 (15.8)	−6.3 (20.7)	0.6 (33.1)	7.4 (45.3)	12.2 (54.0)	17.0 (62.6)	18.8 (65.8)	17.2 (63.0)	12.2 (54.0)	5.6 (42.1)	−0.8 (30.6)	−6.5 (20.3)	5.7 (42.3)
Average precipitation mm (inches)	19.8 (0.78)	16.7 (0.66)	22.0 (0.87)	33.4 (1.31)	31.7 (1.25)	19.3 (0.76)	21.6 (0.85)	11.7 (0.46)	10.0 (0.39)	23.6 (0.93)	31.0 (1.22)	23.0 (0.91)	263.8 (10.39)
Average precipitation days (≥ 1.0 mm)	4.6	4.2	5.0	5.8	5.7	3.9	4.2	2.9	2.1	4.1	5.4	5.1	53.0
Source: NOAA

== Population ==
Shelek is notable for the fact that currently, with the population according to the 2009 census, 26,688 people (according to the 1999 census there were 22,703 people), it is one of the largest villages not only in the Almaty region, but throughout the country. Large populous villages are typical in the foothill regions of southern Kazakhstan. By the population of Shelek, some parts of Almaty and other regions are inferior.

In Soviet times, Shelek became one of the most multinational villages of the region. Kazakhs, Uyghurs and Russians - the main nationalities of the village live here in considerable numbers. Here, deported under the rule of Stalin were the Greeks, Germans, Chechens, Meskhetian Turks and Koreans. In addition, several families were also represented by Ukrainians, Tatars, Armenians, Georgians, Bulgarians, Ossetians, Kurds, Assyrians, Dungans and others.

In the early 1960s, during the open borders between the USSR and the PRC, three new waves of Uyghur settlers from troubled Xinjiang settled in Chilik. By the early 1970s, Uyghurs accounted for nearly one third of the total population of Chilik, outnumbering Kazakhs and Russians. The bulk of Uyghur immigrants settled compactly in houses on Oktyabrskaya Street, then on the outskirts of the village. By the mid-1970s, Uighurs began to play a significant role in the economy of the village, as they were engaged in the cultivation of high-yielding tobacco. In 2006, an interethnic conflict erupted between Uighurs and Kazakhs.Fortunately there were no casualties.

Since the mid-2000s, in Shelek, as well as throughout southern and eastern Kazakhstan, there has been a large flow of migrants from China on the program of returning ethnic Kazakhs to their historical homeland. This served as a sharp change in the image of the village: the national composition was reduced due to the relocation of the majority of ethnic Europeans, the Kazakh language acquired more frequent use in everyday life, the infrastructure of the village itself began to develop at a rapid pace.

== Economics and Tourism ==
In Soviet times, Shelek was known for the functioning of the cane processing plant (called the "reed" by the local population). As the population grew, other industries were added, particularly in the agricultural sector. Shelek has long been known for its tomatoes and tobacco, whose sales revenues have made local farmers among the most prosperous in Kazakhstan. In recent years Kyrgyz citizens have increasingly been drawn to work on tobacco plantations. In modern Shelek there are more than 800 peasant farms, 40 private limited companies, 150 shops, 80 consumer services enterprises, 50 canteens, a large number of cafes, bars, billiards, casinos and restaurants. There are two hospitals in the village, an orphanage, the House of Culture, in which discos are held regularly; recently a roller club was opened. In 2005, a plant for processing vegetables and fruits, as well as a dairy, was established in the village. In Shelek there are branches of Kazkommertsbank, KMF, Halyk Bank.

As an intermediate point between Almaty and China, Shelek is an attractive destination for tourists from Europe and Asia. In particular, the surroundings of Shelek cause the greatest interest, since there is no infrastructure. From the village you can go to the mountains of the Trans-Ili Alatau, visit the Charyn canyon, go to the coast of the Kapchagai reservoir, visit the Altyn Emel national park, take part in rafting on the Ili River, and lovers of relaxation and water procedures can go to the thermal and radon springs that are also in half an hour's drive from Shelek. From the nearest mountains, an indescribable view of the entire valley is visible. In the near future it is planned to open the largest fruit garden, six kilometers from the village, behind the village of Kyzylsharyk.

Only 70 kilometers from Shelek is the famous Kolsay Lakes National Park. The highest point of Kazakhstan, the Khan-Tengri peak, is located 200 kilometers from the village (at the peak of Khan-Tengri, the border of three states passes: Kazakhstan, Kyrgyzstan and China). While traveling around you can meet traders selling national handmade souvenirs, national drinks and snacks (leather, koumiss, shubat, kazy, kurt). Most cafes mainly provide Chinese, Uzbek, Uighur, Russian, Kazakh and Caucasian cuisines.

== Religion ==
In Shelek, there are 5 mosques and 1 church (Temple in the name of St. Great Martyr Demetrius of Thessalonica). The Church of Jehovah's Witnesses unofficially operates.

== Education ==
In the sphere of education in the village there are 2 colleges: technical and medical. In Shelek, eight schools with Kazakh, Russian, Uyghur and mixed languages of instruction are also being built, another school is being built. There are music and automobile schools and 3 kindergartens: "Gulder", "Baiterek" and "Bolashak". The secondary school named after Bijanov was recognized as the best in the region, and four more entered the top thirty in the region. Kindergarten "Gulder" is one of the largest in the region, and has several groups with three languages of instruction and education of children.

== Notable residents ==
- Ivan Stepanovich Butymov - Hero of Socialist Labor.
- Pyotr Borisovich Vikhrev - Hero of the Soviet Union.
- Junusbai Kaipov - Hero of the Soviet Union.
- Ibrahim Kaldybaev is a full cavalier of the Order of Glory.
- Kenzhebaev Tule Tascentbayly - Hero of the Soviet Union.
- Yuri Loza is a singer.
- Mariyam Tokhtakhanovna Semyatova - People's Artist of the Kazakh SSR.

=== Monuments and Museums ===
The Museum of local history opened in 1981. The total area of the Museum is 279.6 square meters. There are 2,222 items of Museum significance in the Museum's collection. The Museum consists of 4 halls, which are divided into thematic sections: "Independent Kazakhstan", History of the past (the archaeological heritage of the region, the region in the Middle Ages, the nature of the region, Ethnography), “Feat in the memory of the people"," Labor is red man".
