= Koksu (Karatal) =

River in Kazakhstan

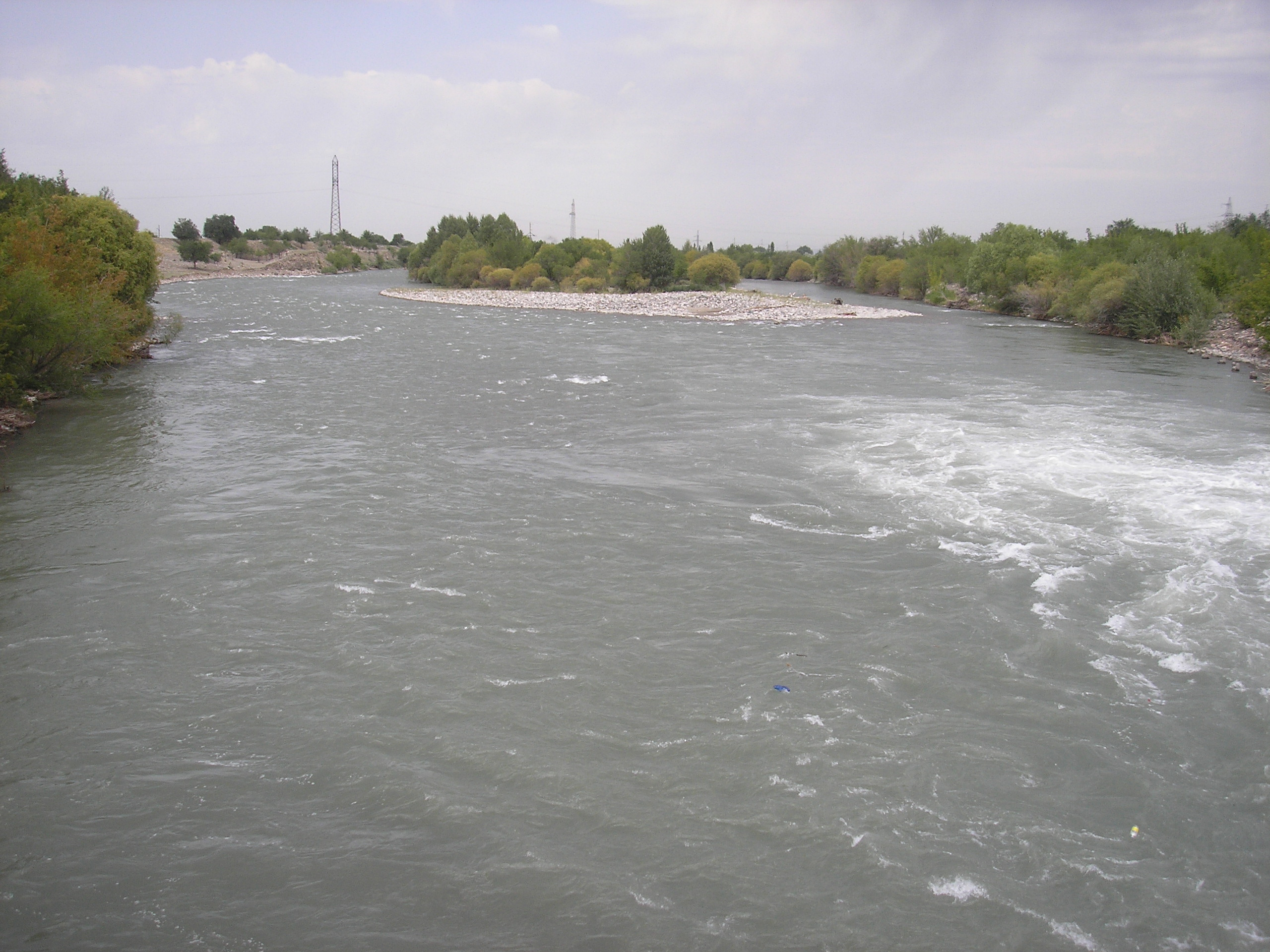

Location
- Country: Kazakhstan

Physical characteristics
- Mouth: Karatal
  - coordinates: 44.9981°N 78.1125°E
- Length: 205 km (127 mi)
- Basin size: 4,670 km^{2} (1,800 sq mi)

Basin features
- Progression: Karatal→ Lake Balkhash

The Köksu (Kazakh: Көксу, lit. 'blue water') is a river of the Balkhash-Alakol Basin, Kazakhstan. It flows within Almaty Region, in the historical Semirechye region, from the western slopes of the Dzungarian Alatau. The river is 205 kilometres (127 mi) long and has a basin area of 4,670 square kilometres (1,800 sq mi).

It is the largest river in the Koksu District and gives its name to the district.

Several hydro-electric projects are located along the river, including the Kyzylbulak Hydroelectric Power Plant and Kyzylkungei Hydroelectric Power Plant.
