= 1911 Kebin earthquake =

Earthquake in Kazakhstan on 3 January 1911

- Location within Kyrgyzstan
- UTC time: 1911-01-03 23:25:48
- ISC event: 16958130
- USGS-ANSS: ComCat
- Local date: 4 January 1911
- Local time: 05:25
- Magnitude: 8.0 M_{w} 8.1 M_{s}
- Depth: 20 km (12 mi)
- Epicenter: 42.9°N 76.8°E
- Areas affected: Kyrgyzstan, Kazakhstan
- Total damage: Severe
- Max. intensity: MMI X (Extreme)
- Casualties: 452 dead, 740 injured

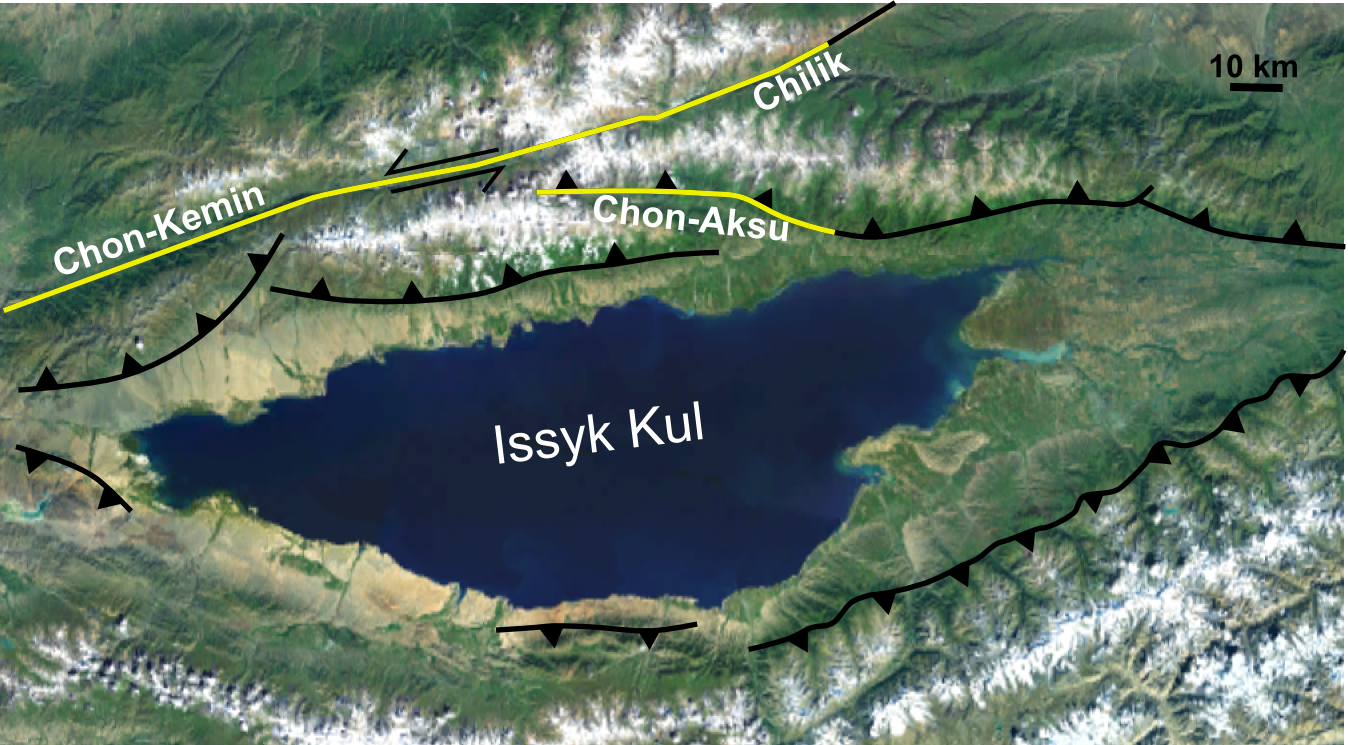
Main geological structures around Issyk Kul lake with zones of ground ruptures from the 1911 earthquake shown in yellow

The 1911 Kebin earthquake, or Chon-Kemin earthquake, struck Russian Turkestan on 3 January. Registering at a moment magnitude of 8.0, it killed 452 people, destroyed more than 770 buildings (which was almost all of the city) in Almaty, Kazakhstan, and resulted in 125 miles (201 km) of surface faulting in the valleys of Chon-Kemin, Chilik and Chon-Aksu.

== Tectonic setting ==
The Tien Shan mountains form part of the broad zone of deformation associated with the continuing collision between the Indian plate and the Eurasian plate. In the region around Issyk Kul, the tectonic regime is a combination of thrusting and sinistral strike-slip. The lake is formed in a ramp basin bounded to both north and south by opposite verging thrust faults, while the major Chon-Kemin–Chilik strike-slip fault runs along the linear valleys to the north.

== Characteristics ==
In the Chong-Kemin and Chilik valleys, and on the shoreline of Issyk Kul, a complex zone of surface rupture was identified by fieldwork immediately following the earthquake. Two main zones of rupture were noted, one complex zone along the Chon-Kemin and Chilik valleys, the other along the Chon-Aksu valley.

=== Chon-Kemin Chilik rupture zone ===
This complex zone of ruptures has four main segments: the 20 km long Dzhil'-Aryk, the 62 km long Lower Chon-Kemin, south side, the 40 km long Lower Chon-Kemin, north side and the 66 km long Upper Chon-Kemin-Chilik zone. The Dzhil'-Aryk segment shows evidence of reverse faulting on a south-dipping fault plane, with no clear evidence of lateral movement. The sense of displacement along the rest of the near-vertical Chon-Kemin and Chilik rupture zone was dominantly of sinistral (left lateral) strike-slip with minor amounts of reverse faulting, with between one and three metres of vertical displacement. Left-lateral displacements of up to 40 m recognised from the offset of river channels, represent cumulative displacements and no separate estimates have been obtained for the 1911 event.

=== Chon-Aksu Aksu rupture zone ===
This zone has two parts: the 40 km long Chon-Aksu segment and the 34 km long Aksu segment. Along the Chon-Aksu valley the movement was dominantly reverse in type along a 60° north-dipping reverse fault, with up to 10.5 m vertical displacement and at most 1 m horizontal displacement, from the lack of observed offset of river thalwegs. The outcrop pattern of the Aksu segment rupture indicates a low-angle thrust, possibly steepening with depth, with a maximum vertical offset or 3–5 m, decreasing steadily to the east. In total about 200 km of fault surfaces ruptured, although there was no visible faulting joining the two main rupture zones.

=== Landslides ===
Many landslides and rock avalanches were triggered by the earthquake and are associated with the mapped zones of surface rupture. The two largest landslides were the Kaindy rock avalanche and the Ananevo rockslide. The Kaindy landslide, with a volume of 15 billion m^{3}, was formed of a mass of limestone that buried a group of yurts and killed 38 people. The Ananevo rockslide also had a volume of about 15 billion m^{3}, and was formed of weathered granitic material, with a 250 m high backscarp that is still visible.

== Impact ==
Most of the region's inhabitants lived in yurts, which are relatively resistant to earthquakes and unlikely to cause deaths even if they do collapse. The greatest damage and most of the casualties, including in yurts, resulted from landslides triggered by the earthquake, with 452 people killed and another 740 people injured. Nearly 1,100 houses and 4,545 yurts were destroyed by the earthquake and the resulting landslides.

== See also ==
- List of earthquakes in 1911
- List of earthquakes in Kyrgyzstan
- 1902 Turkestan earthquake
