= 1971 Jambyl earthquake =

Earthquake in Kazakhstan

- Location within Kazakhstan
- UTC time: 1971-05-10 14:51:46
- Local date: 10 May 1971
- Magnitude: M_{w} 5.3
- Depth: 17.8 km (11 mi)
- Epicenter: 42.887°N 71.267°E
- Areas affected: Jambyl Region, Kazakhstan
- Max. intensity: MSK-64 VII (Very strong)

The 1971 Jambyl earthquake was one of the major earthquakes in Kazakhstan. It occurred in Jambyl (now Taraz) on May 10, 1971, with a magnitude of 5.3. In some parts of the city and nearby areas the vibrations were manifested with intensity of up to 7 points. More than 28,000 buildings and structures, including 16,500 private houses were damaged. There is no information about fatalities.
