= 1911 Kikai Island earthquake =

Earthquake in the Ryukyu Islands, Japan

- 喜界島地震
- Location within Kagoshima Prefecture
- UTC time: 1911-06-15 14:25:53
- ISC event: 16958149
- USGS-ANSS: ComCat
- Local date: 15 June 1911
- Local time: 23:26
- Magnitude: M_{s} 8.1
- Depth: 10 km (6.2 mi)
- Epicenter: 28.7°N 130.6°E
- Areas affected: Japan
- Casualties: 12 deaths

The 1911 Kikai Island earthquake (喜界島地震, Kikai-jima Jishin) occurred on June 15 at 23:26 local time (14:26 UTC). The epicenter of the earthquake was located near Kikai Island, Japan. It had a magnitude of M_{s} 8.1.

== Overview ==
The earthquake occurred near the northern end of the deepest region in Ryukyu Trench. The hypocenter was located near 28.00°E, 130.00°N, about 30 km south of the Kikai Island, with a depth of about 100 km. However, due to the instrumental precision of that time, the location of the hypocenter was just an approximation, and estimations differ. A recent study estimated that the hypocenter was located near 28.90°E, 130.25°N, about 60 km NNE of the Kikai Island, with a depth of about 30 km. In 2013, another study reevaluated the location and depth of the earthquake and found that its hypocenter depth was 10 km. The reevaluation also relocated the epicenter location to 28.7°E, 130.6°N.

Twelve people were reported dead, including one on Kikai Island. Four hundred and twenty two houses were completely destroyed, 401 of which on Kikai Island. Damage was also reported on Amami Ōshima, Toku-no-shima, and Okinawa Island. The wall of Shuri Castle in Shuri was damaged. This earthquake could be felt as far as in Shanghai, China, Tainan, Taiwan (then under Japanese rule), and Fukushima, Japan.

== Tsunami ==
The earthquake triggered a tsunami which was recorded on Kikai Island and Amami Ōshima. The tsunami was relatively small on the east coast of Kikai Island, but had a height of at least 5m on the west coast of Kikai Island and also in Amami Ōshima, and may have had a maximum height of over 10m in certain parts of Kikai Island.

== See also ==
- List of earthquakes in 1911
- List of earthquakes in Japan
