= Rudnichny City District =

Rudnichny City District is the name of several city divisions in Russia:

- Rudnichny City District, Kemerovo, a city district of Kemerovo, the administrative center of Kemerovo Oblast
- Rudnichny City District, Prokopyevsk, a city district of Prokopyevsk, a city in Kemerovo Oblast
Cities in Russia with a city division called "Rudnichny"

== See also ==
- Rudnichny (disambiguation)
