= 1911 Michoacán earthquake =

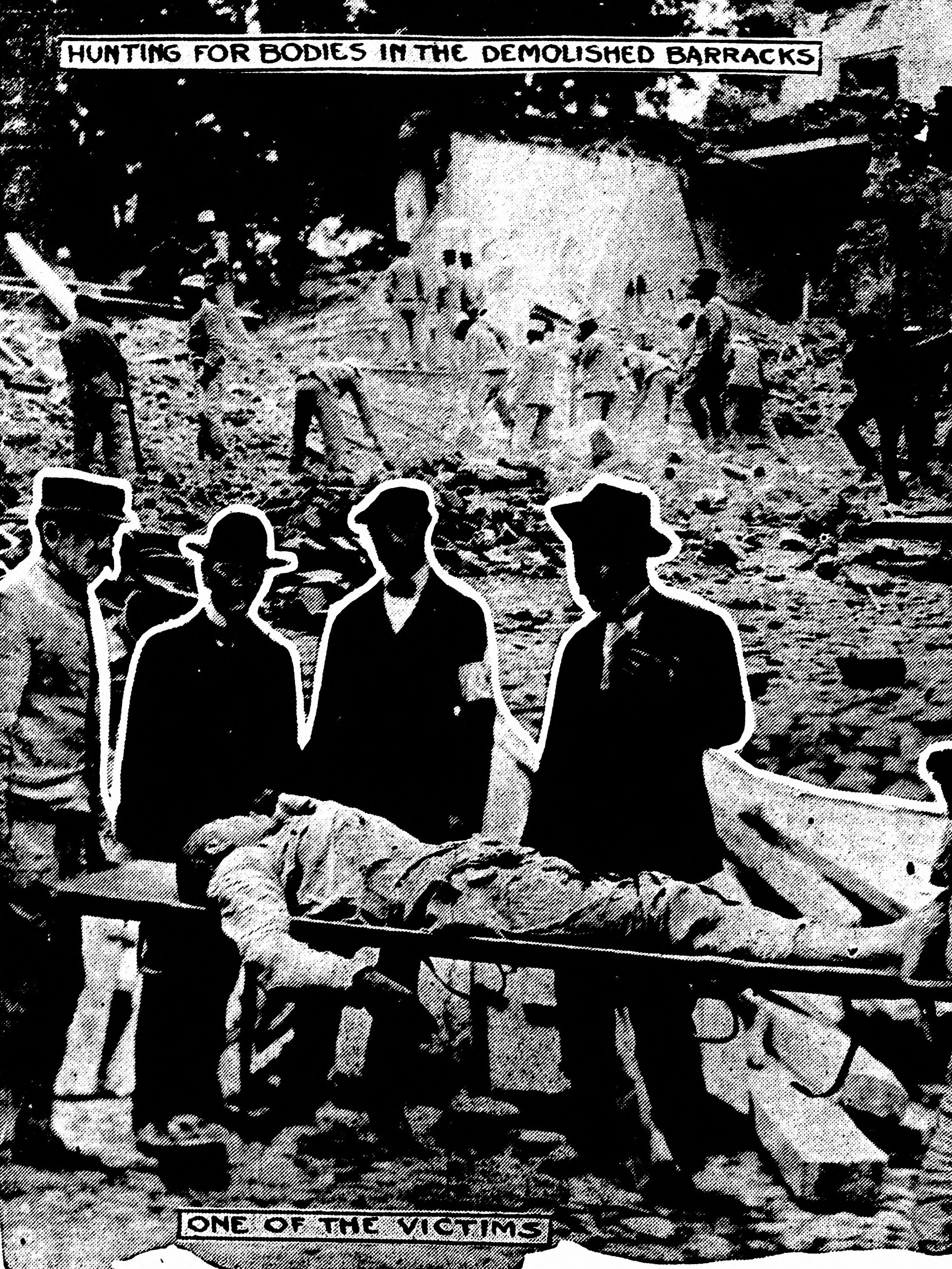
- Scenes from a contemporary newspaper

- Location within Mexico
- UTC time: 1911-06-07 11:02:50
- ISC event
- USGS-ANSS: ComCat
- Local date: June 7, 1911
- Local time: 04:26
- Magnitude: 7.6 M_{w}
- Depth: 33 km
- Epicenter: 17.5°N 102.5°W
- Areas affected: Mexico
- Casualties: 45 dead

The 1911 Michoacán earthquake occurred on June 7 at 04:26 local time (11:02 UTC). The epicenter was located near the coast of Michoacán, Mexico. The earthquake had a magnitude of 7.6 on the moment magnitude scale. 45 people were reported dead. In Mexico City, 119 houses were destroyed. Cracks were reported in Palacio Nacional, Escuela Normal para Maestros, Escuela Preparatoria, Inspección de Policía, and Instituto Geológico. Ciudad Guzmán, the seat of Zapotlán el Grande, Jalisco, suffered great damage.

The earthquake occurred hours before the revolutionary Francisco I. Madero entered Mexico City on the same day, and it was also known as "temblor maderista".

On June 7, 2011, a ceremony was held in Ciudad Guzmán commemorating the centenary of this earthquake.

This earthquake was a megathrust earthquake along the Middle America Trench, a major subduction zone.

== See also ==
- List of earthquakes in 1911
- List of earthquakes in Mexico
