= Bartogay Lake =

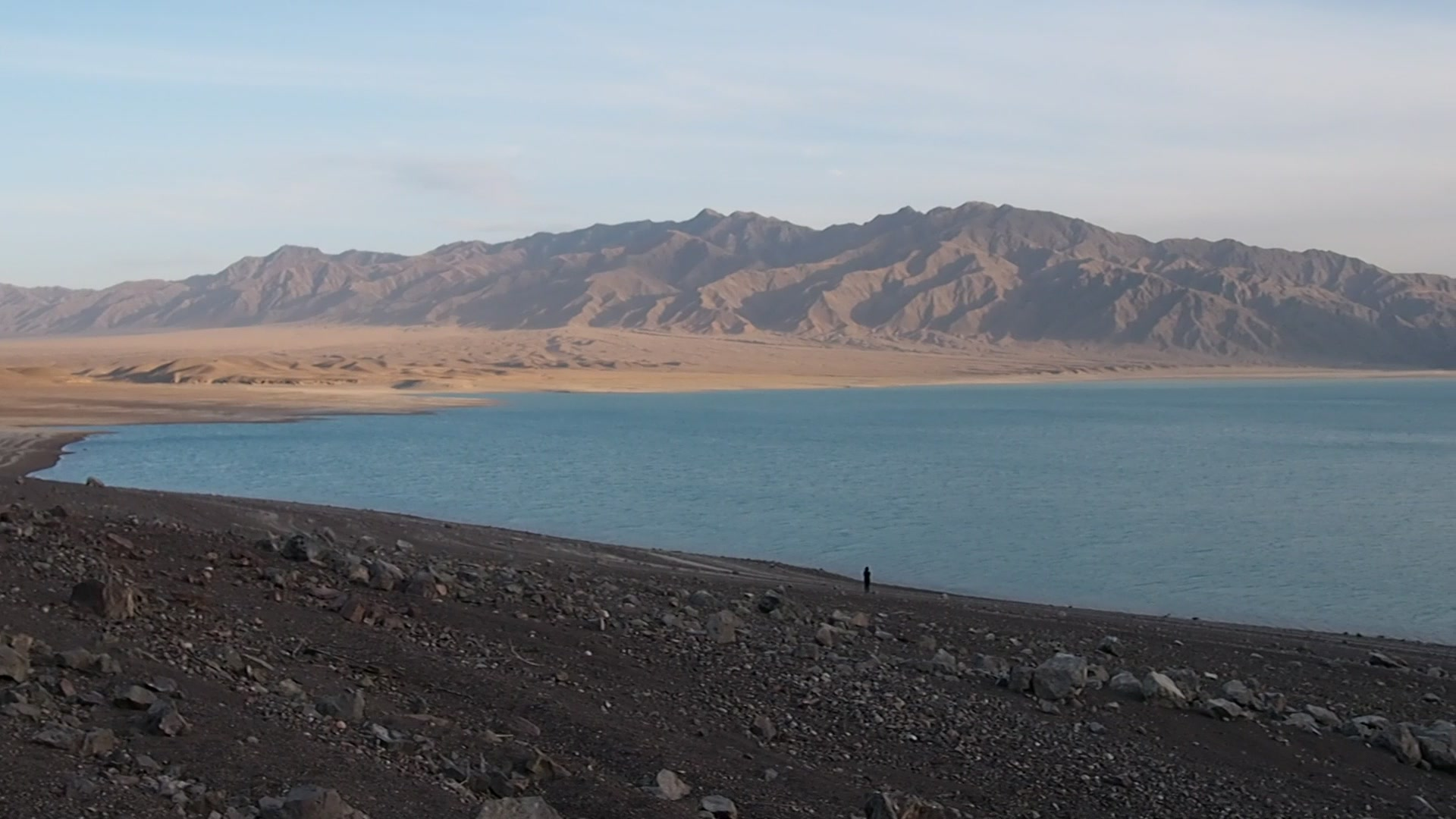
- Bartogai Lake

- Location within Kazakhstan
- Location: Almaty Region of Kazakhstan
- Coordinates: 43.347926°N 78.500687°E
- Type: reservoir

Bartogai Lake (Kazakh: Бартоғай бөгені, Bartoğai bögenı) is a reservoir in the Almaty Region of Kazakhstan. As it is far away from any pollution sources, it has remained relatively pristine. It was formed in the early 1980s on the Chilik River at the base of the Sogety Plateau (Syugaty Hills) as part of an irrigation project. The dam was completed in 1983 and the site became operational in 1985. It collects water during the winter and then releases it for irrigation from June through September.

Recreational fishing in the lake and in the outlet stream is permitted at certain times of year. Animals in the area include marmots.

In the Almaty Region, thanks to Bartogay reservoir, the Shelek (Chilik) river was formed. In the early 1980s, the river was dammed by a stone-embankment 60 meters high, with a length of 330 meters. The waters of the reservoir feed the Big Almaty Canal, which stretches to the city of Almaty, irrigating the foothill agricultural zone on its way. Bartogai is an ancient tract. On all sides, the tract is surrounded by mountains which shield it from the wind. In the middle of the area is a vast clearing. Once it was arable land; there are traces of ancient ditches. There are also many ancient burial mounds in Bartogai. The stones that form the mounds are covered with soil and are barely distinguishable from the surrounding terrain. The abundance of mounds here is no accident. From time immemorial, attracting people, Bartogai was considered sacred. Rites were performed there, and holidays were celebrated.
