= List of earthquakes in 1911 =

List of earthquakes in the year 1911

Earthquakes in 1911
Approximate epicenters of the earthquakes in 1911
- 4.0–5.9 magnitude
- 6.0–6.9 magnitude
- 7.0–7.9 magnitude
- 8.0+ magnitude
- Strongest: Japan, Ryukyu Islands June 15 (Magnitude 7.9)
- Deadliest: Iran, Kerman Province April 18 (Magnitude 6.5) 700 deaths
- Total fatalities: 1,326

Number by magnitude
- 9.0+: 0

This is a list of earthquakes in 1911. Only magnitude 6.0 or greater earthquakes appear on the list. Lower magnitude events are included if they have caused death, injury or damage. Events which occurred in remote areas will be excluded from the list as they wouldn't have generated significant media interest. All dates are listed according to UTC time.

== Overall ==
=== By death toll ===
Rank	Death toll	Magnitude	Location	MMI	Depth (km)	Date
1	700	6.5	Iran, Kerman Province	( )	15.0	April 18
2	450	7.7	(Russian Empire) Kazakhstan, Almaty Province	X (Extreme)	20.0	January 3
3	90	7.3	(Russian Empire) Tajikistan, Gorno-Badakhshan Autonomous Region	( )	15.0	February 18
4	45	7.6	Mexico, Michoacan	( )	30.0	June 7
5	28	7.3	Mexico, Guerrero	IV (Light)	30.0	December 16
6	12	7.9	Japan, Ryukyu Islands	( )	100.0	June 15

- Note: At least 10 casualties

=== By magnitude ===
Rank	Magnitude	Death toll	Location	MMI	Depth (km)	Date
1	7.9	12	Japan, Ryukyu Islands	( )	100.0	June 15
2	7.8	0	(German Empire) Palau, east of	( )	15.0	August 16
= 3	7.7	450	(Russian Empire) Kazakhstan, Almaty Province	X (Extreme)	20.0	January 3
= 3	7.7	0	(United States) Philippines, east of Mindanao	X (Extreme)	15.0	July 12
4	7.6	45	Mexico, Michoacan	( )	30.0	June 7
= 5	7.4	0	(Russian Empire) Russia, off the east coast of Kamchatka	VII (Very strong)	240.0	May 4
= 5	7.4	0	Afghanistan, Badakhshan Province	( )	190.0	July 4
= 6	7.3	90	(Russian Empire) Tajikistan, Gorno-Badakhshan Autonomous Region	( )	15.0	February 18
= 6	7.3	0	(New Hebrides) Vanuatu	( )	200.0	November 22
= 6	7.3	28	Mexico, Guerrero	IV (Light)	30.0	December 16
7	7.2	0	Tonga	( )	300.0	August 21
= 8	7.1	0	Chile, off the coast of Tarapaca Region	( )	0.0	September 15
= 8	7.1	0	United States, Rat Islands, Alaska	( )	0.0	September 17
= 9	7.0	0	Colombia, Magdalena Department	( )	100.0	April 10
= 9	7.0	0	(Netherlands) Indonesia, Bali Sea	( )	370.0	July 5
= 9	7.0	0	(Russian Empire) Russia, south of Sakhalin	( )	350.0	September 6
= 9	7.0	0	British Solomon Islands, Santa Cruz Islands	( )	160.0	October 20

- Note: At least 7.0 magnitude

== Notable events ==
=== January ===
January
- Strongest: 7.7 M_{w} (Russian Empire) Kazakhstan
- Deadliest: 7.7 M_{w} (Russian Empire) Kazakhstan; 450 deaths
- Total fatalities: 451+

Number by magnitude
- 8.0–8.9: 0
- 7.0–7.9: 1
- 6.0–6.9: 1
- 5.0–5.9: 1

Date	Country and location	M_{w}	Depth (km)	MMI	Notes	Casualties	
Date	Country and location	M_{w}	Depth (km)	MMI	Notes	Dead	Injured
1	Afghanistan, Balkh Province	6.7	35.0				
3	(Russian Empire) Kazakhstan, Almaty Province	7.7	20.0	X	The 1911 Kebin earthquake caused 450 deaths and major damage.	450	
26	(Qing dynasty) China, Hebei Province	5.5	0.0	VII	At least 1 death and 1 injury were reported. Many homes were destroyed in the area. The depth was unknown.	1+	1+
27	(United States) Philippines, Luzon	0.0	0.0	IX	Numerous earthquakes struck the area at the time of a major eruption of Taal Volcano. The earthquakes were not large but enough of them struck to cause some homes to be destroyed or damaged. No magnitude or depth information is known.		

=== February ===
February
- Strongest: 7.3 M_{w} (Russian Empire) Tajikistan
- Deadliest: 7.3 M_{w} (Russian Empire) Tajikistan; 90 deaths
- Total fatalities: 90

Number by magnitude
- 8.0–8.9: 0
- 7.0–7.9: 1
- 6.0–6.9: 2

Date	Country and location	M_{w}	Depth (km)	MMI	Notes	Casualties	
Date	Country and location	M_{w}	Depth (km)	MMI	Notes	Dead	Injured
18	(Russian Empire) Tajikistan, Gorno-Badakhshan Autonomous Region	7.3	15.0		The 1911 Sarez earthquake caused 90 deaths. Many homes were damaged or destroyed. A landslide appears to have contributed to the destruction.	90	
18	(Ottoman Empire) North Macedonia, Lake Ohrid	6.7	0.0	X	The depth was unknown.		
23	(Empire of Japan) Japan, Ryukyu Islands	6.9	5.0				

=== March ===
March
- Strongest: 6.8 M_{w} (Empire of Japan) Japan
- Total fatalities: 0

Number by magnitude
- 8.0–8.9: 0
- 7.0–7.9: 0
- 6.0–6.9: 2

Date	Country and location	M_{w}	Depth (km)	MMI	Notes	Casualties	
Date	Country and location	M_{w}	Depth (km)	MMI	Notes	Dead	Injured
6	(United States) Philippines, southeast of Mindanao	6.6	100.0				
24	(Empire of Japan) Japan, southwest Ryukyu Islands	6.8	35.0				

=== April ===
April
- Strongest: 7.0 M_{w} Colombia
- Deadliest: 6.5 M_{w} Iran; 700 deaths
- Total fatalities: 700

Number by magnitude
- 8.0–8.9: 0
- 7.0–7.9: 1
- 6.0–6.9: 5

Date	Country and location	M_{w}	Depth (km)	MMI	Notes	Casualties	
Date	Country and location	M_{w}	Depth (km)	MMI	Notes	Dead	Injured
4	Ottoman Empire, Dodecanese Islands	6.0	15.0				
10	Colombia, Magdalena Department	7.0	100.0				
18	Iran, Kerman Province	6.5	15.0		700 deaths were caused and many homes were destroyed.	700	
28	Colombia, Vaupes Department	6.9	600.0				
28	Fiji, south of	6.5	600.0				
30	Ottoman Empire, off the coast of Antalya Province	6.2	180.0				

=== May ===
May
- Strongest: 7.4 M_{w} Russian Empire
- Total fatalities: 0

Number by magnitude
- 8.0–8.9: 0
- 7.0–7.9: 1
- 6.0–6.9: 0
- 5.0–5.9: 1

Date	Country and location	M_{w}	Depth (km)	MMI	Notes	Casualties	
Date	Country and location	M_{w}	Depth (km)	MMI	Notes	Dead	Injured
4	Russian Empire, off the east coast of Kamchatka	7.4	240.0	VII			
14	(Qing dynasty) China, Guangdong Province	5.5	0.0	VII	Many homes were destroyed. Depth unknown.		

=== June ===
June
- Strongest: 7.9 M_{w} (Empire of Japan) Japan
- Deadliest: 7.6 M_{w} Mexico; 45 deaths
- Total fatalities: 57

Number by magnitude
- 8.0–8.9: 0
- 7.0–7.9: 2
- 6.0–6.9: 0

Date	Country and location	M_{w}	Depth (km)	MMI	Notes	Casualties	
Date	Country and location	M_{w}	Depth (km)	MMI	Notes	Dead	Injured
7	Mexico, Michoacan	7.6	30.0		45 people were killed and a further 22 people were injured. Some damage was caused by the 1911 Michoacan earthquake.	45	22
15	Japan, northwest of the Ryukyu Islands	7.9	100.0		Due to the 1911 Kikai Island earthquake 12 people were killed. 422 homes were destroyed.	12	

=== July ===
July
- Strongest: 7.7 M_{w} (United States) Philippines
- Total fatalities: 0

Number by magnitude
- 8.0–8.9: 0
- 7.0–7.9: 3
- 6.0–6.9: 4

Date	Country and location	M_{w}	Depth (km)	MMI	Notes	Casualties	
Date	Country and location	M_{w}	Depth (km)	MMI	Notes	Dead	Injured
1	(Qing dynasty) China, Xizang Province	6.5	0.0		Depth unknown.		
1	United States, central California	6.6	35.0		Some damage was caused.		
4	Afghanistan, Badakhshan Province	7.4	190.0				
5	Dutch East Indies, Bali Sea	7.0	370.0				
11	New Hebrides	6.7	150.0				
12	(United States) Philippines, east of Mindanao	7.7	15.0	X	Many homes were damaged.		
19	New Zealand, Kermadec Islands	6.7	200.0				

=== August ===
August
- Strongest: 7.8 M_{w} (German Empire) Palau
- Total fatalities: 0

Number by magnitude
- 8.0–8.9: 0
- 7.0–7.9: 2
- 6.0–6.9: 1

Date	Country and location	M_{w}	Depth (km)	MMI	Notes	Casualties	
Date	Country and location	M_{w}	Depth (km)	MMI	Notes	Dead	Injured
16	(German Empire) Palau, east of	7.8	15.0				
21	Tonga	7.2	300.0				
27	Mexico, Oaxaca	6.6	100.0				

=== September ===
September
- Strongest: 7.1 M_{w} 2 events
- Total fatalities: 0

Number by magnitude
- 8.0–8.9: 0
- 7.0–7.9: 3
- 6.0–6.9: 3

Date	Country and location	M_{w}	Depth (km)	MMI	Notes	Casualties	
Date	Country and location	M_{w}	Depth (km)	MMI	Notes	Dead	Injured
6	Russian Empire, south of Sakhalin	7.0	350.0				
8	Russian Empire, Kuril Islands	6.5	80.0				
12	France, southeast of the Loyalty Islands	6.6	150.0				
15	Chile, off the coast of Tarapaca Region	7.1	0.0		Depth unknown.		
17	United States, Rat Islands, Alaska	7.1	0.0		Depth unknown.		
22	United States, Kenai Peninsula, Alaska	6.7	60.0	VIII			

=== October ===
October
- Strongest: 7.0 M_{w} British Solomon Islands
- Total fatalities: 0

Number by magnitude
- 8.0–8.9: 0
- 7.0–7.9: 1
- 6.0–6.9: 2

Date	Country and location	M_{w}	Depth (km)	MMI	Notes	Casualties	
Date	Country and location	M_{w}	Depth (km)	MMI	Notes	Dead	Injured
6	Dominican Republic, Monsenor Nouel Province	6.8	0.0		Depth unknown.		
14	(Qing dynasty) China, western Xizang Province	6.5	20.0				
20	British Solomon Islands, Santa Cruz Islands	7.0	160.0				

=== November ===
November
- Strongest: 7.3 M_{w} New Hebrides
- Total fatalities: 0

Number by magnitude
- 8.0–8.9: 0
- 7.0–7.9: 1
- 6.0–6.9: 4

Date	Country and location	M_{w}	Depth (km)	MMI	Notes	Casualties	
Date	Country and location	M_{w}	Depth (km)	MMI	Notes	Dead	Injured
8	Japan, southeast of Honshu	6.5	35.0				
13	United States, Near Islands, Alaska	6.9	0.0		Depth unknown.		
16	German Empire, Baden-Wurttemburg	6.2	40.0				
21	Japan, Sea of Japan	6.6	300.0				
22	New Hebrides	7.3	200.0				

=== December ===
December
- Strongest: 7.3 M_{w} Mexico
- Deadliest: 7.3 M_{w} Mexico; 28 deaths
- Total fatalities: 28

Number by magnitude
- 8.0–8.9: 0
- 7.0–7.9: 1
- 6.0–6.9: 1

Date	Country and location	M_{w}	Depth (km)	MMI	Notes	Casualties	
Date	Country and location	M_{w}	Depth (km)	MMI	Notes	Dead	Injured
16	Mexico, Guerrero	7.3	30.0	IV	28 people were killed.	28	
31	German New Guinea, Ninigo Islands	6.8	0.0		Depth unknown.		
