= Ramp basin =

A ramp basin is a geological depression bounded by a pair of opposite-facing reverse faults or thrust faults. In rifting, the equivalent structure is a graben, although the bounding faults are normal rather than reverse in type. Examples of this type of basin include the Cul-de-Sac depression in Haiti and Issyk-Kul in the Tian Shan mountains in Kyrgyzstan.
