= Rudnichny, Russia =

Rudnichny (Russian: Рудничный; masculine), Rudnichnaya (Рудничная; feminine), or Rudnichnoye (Рудничное; neuter) is the name of several inhabited localities in Russia which have a mixture of settings.

== Urban localities ==
- Rudnichny, Kemerovo Oblast, an urban-type settlement under the administrative jurisdiction of the city of oblast significance of Anzhero-Sudzhensk, Kemerovo Oblast
- Rudnichny, Kirov Oblast, an urban-type settlement in Verkhnekamsky District, Kirov Oblast

== Rural localities ==
- Rudnichny, Sverdlovsk Oblast, a former urban-type settlement in Sverdlovsk Oblast, Russia; since 2004—a rural locality

== Abolished inhabited localities ==
- Rudnichny, a former urban-type settlement in Perm Oblast; since 2004—a part of the town of Kizel
