= 1992 Suusamyr earthquake =

Earthquake in Kyrgyzstan

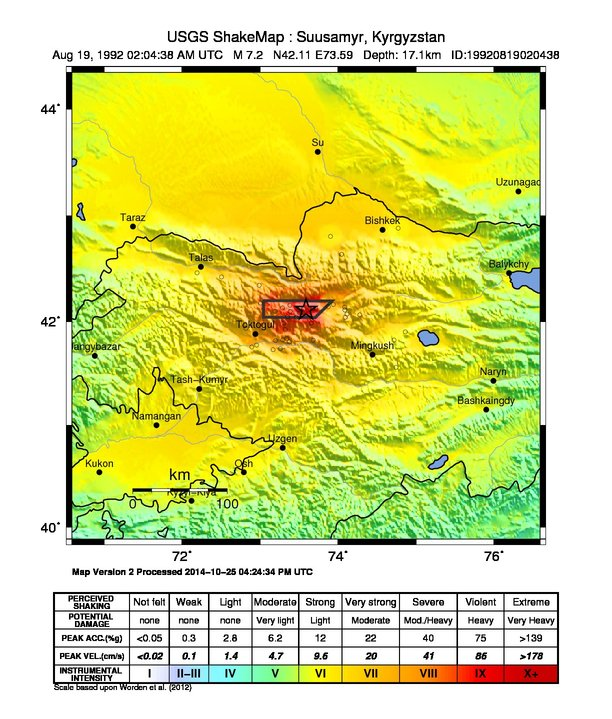
- USGS ShakeMap

- Location within Kyrgyzstan
- UTC time: 1992-08-19 02:04:37
- ISC event: 278018
- USGS-ANSS: ComCat
- Local date: 19 August 1992
- Local time: 08:04:37 KGT (UTC+6)
- Magnitude: M_{s} 7.3
- Depth: 27.4 km (17.0 mi)
- Epicenter: 42.142°N 73.575°E
- Areas affected: Kyrgyzstan, Tajikistan, Uzbekistan, Kazakhstan and China
- Max. intensity: MMI IX (Violent)
- Casualties: 75 deaths

The 1992 Suusamyr earthquake occurred at 08:04:37 KGT (02:04:37 UTC) on 19 August near Toluk in the border area of Kyrgyzstan. The shock had a surface-wave magnitude of 7.3 and a maximum felt intensity of IX (Violent) on the Mercalli intensity scale. It was a result of reverse faulting. The death toll from the event amounted to about 75, including 14 people who were killed by landslides.

== See also ==
- List of earthquakes in Kyrgyzstan
- List of earthquakes in 1992
