= 1885 Belovodoskoe earthquake =

Earthquake in Turkestan (now Kyrgyzstan)

- Location within Kyrgyzstan Location within Kazakhstan
- UTC time: 1885-08-02 21:20:00
- Local date: 2 August 1885
- Local time: 14:20
- Magnitude: 6.7–7.6 M_{w}
- Depth: 15 km (9 mi)
- Epicenter: 42.7°N 74.1°E
- Areas affected: Kyrgyzstan, Kazakhstan
- Max. intensity: MMI X (Extreme)
- Casualties: 54 dead

The 1885 Belovodoskoe earthquake occurred on 2 August, in the Chüy Region, Russian Turkestan (now Kyrgyzstan), with a moment magnitude of 6.7–7.6. It had an epicenter in the west of Bishkek. This earthquake damaged 2 villages and caused 54 deaths. The maximum MSK-64 intensity was estimated at IX–X (Devastating).

== Earthquake ==
The earthquake was assigned a maximum Medvedev–Sponheuer–Karnik scale of IX–X. The surface rupture had an area about 20 km length between the Sokuluk and Aksu rivers, parallel to the mountain front, and a width between 0.2 and 2.1 m. The earthquake was felt over a large area. It caused numerous fractures and surface cracks, including a 20-km-long and up to 2-m-wide fracture between the Sokuluk and Aksu rivers. It also initiated rockfalls and landslides, some of which temporarily blocked the Sokuluk and Aksu rivers. Heavy liquefaction was reported from the area around the Aksu river.

An earthquake catalogue compiled by Kondorskaya and Shebalin assigned the earthquake magnitude as 6.9, but did not specify the subtype. This was calculated from the seismic intensity data. The maximum intensity was IX–X on the Rossi–Forel scale. In 2014, Bindi and others determined a moment magnitude of 6.7±0.4 based on an equation to calculate from seismic intensity data on the Medvedev–Sponheuer–Karnik scale.

The earthquake may have produced uplift across a riverbed, expressed as a 1.5 m (4 ft 11 in) scarp, discovered following a topographic survey finding published in 2001. In Belek, no evidence of surface rupture were found. The estimated magnitude was 6.9–7.4. In 2018, Krüger and others reassessed the moment magnitudes of major earthquakes in Central Asia; they determined 7.6±0.15 for the Belovodoskoe earthquake.

== Impact ==
Two villages from Kara-Balta and Belovodskoye were damaged, and 54 people died from the earthquake.
