= Chilik (river) =

Chilik Shilik, Shelek
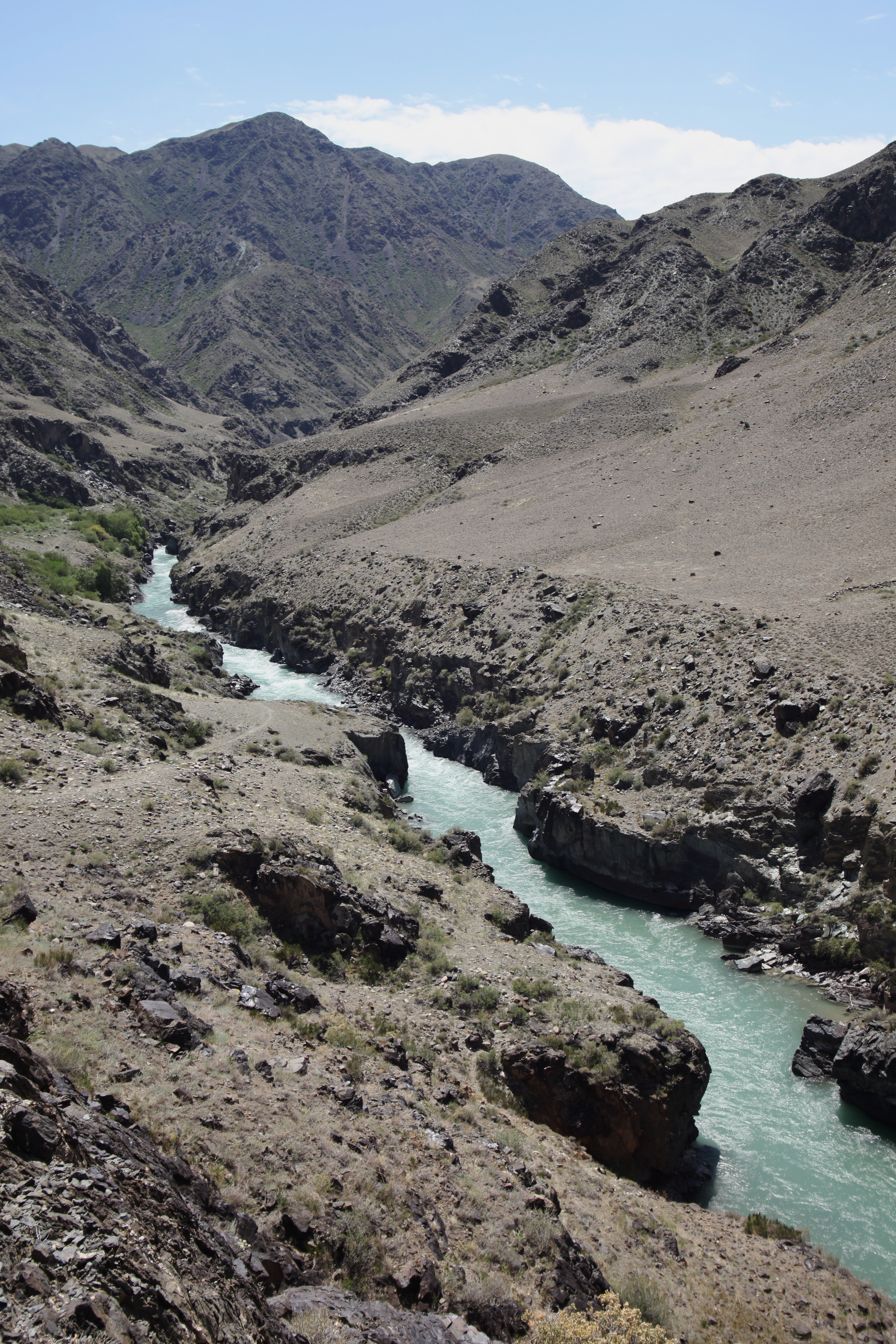
- Canyon of the Chilik River. May 2013

- Location within Kazakhstan
- Native name: Шелек (Kazakh)

Location
- Country: Kazakhstan

Physical characteristics
- Source: Jangyryk glacier
  - coordinates: 42.9627°N 77.2160°E
- Mouth: Ili
  - location: Kapchagay Reservoir
  - coordinates: 43.8192°N 78.1590°E
  - elevation: Sea level
- Length: 245 km (152 mi)
- Basin size: 4,980 km^{2} (1,920 mi^{2})
- Discharge
  - average: 32.2 m^{3}/s (1,140 cu ft/s)

Basin features
- Progression: Ili→ Lake Balkhash

The Chilik (Russian: Чилик), Shilik (Kazakh: Шілік), or Shelek (Kazakh: Шелек) is a major river in the Almaty Region in the Republic of Kazakhstan, one of the largest left tributaries of the Ili, and the main waterway of southeastern Kazakhstan. The Bartogay reservoir has been created on the river, from where the Great Almaty canal begins.

== Location ==
In the valley of the river is the village of Shelek with the same name, the former Administrative centre of the Chilik district of Almaty region (now merged with the Enbekshikazakh District). Also in the river valley are the villages of Malybai, Bijanova, Bayseit, Sarybulak, Milyanfan and Masak.

== Current ==
The Chilik, in its upper course Jangyryk, is 245 kilometres (152 mi) long, and has a drainage basin of 4,980 square kilometres (1,920 sq mi) It originates on the Jangyryk glacier, on the southern slope of Trans-Ili Alatau. It then goes to the Ili valley, where it is divided into the Kur-Chilik and Ulhun-Chilik branches. It flows into the Kapchagay Reservoir. Tributaries to Zhenishke. The average annual water discharge is 63 km from the mouth 32.2 m^{3} per sec. The water of the river is mainly used for the purpose of irrigation. Recently, the river has become increasingly popular as an object of tourism for extreme water sports (also includes the Sharyn River, Kazan River and Koksu River).

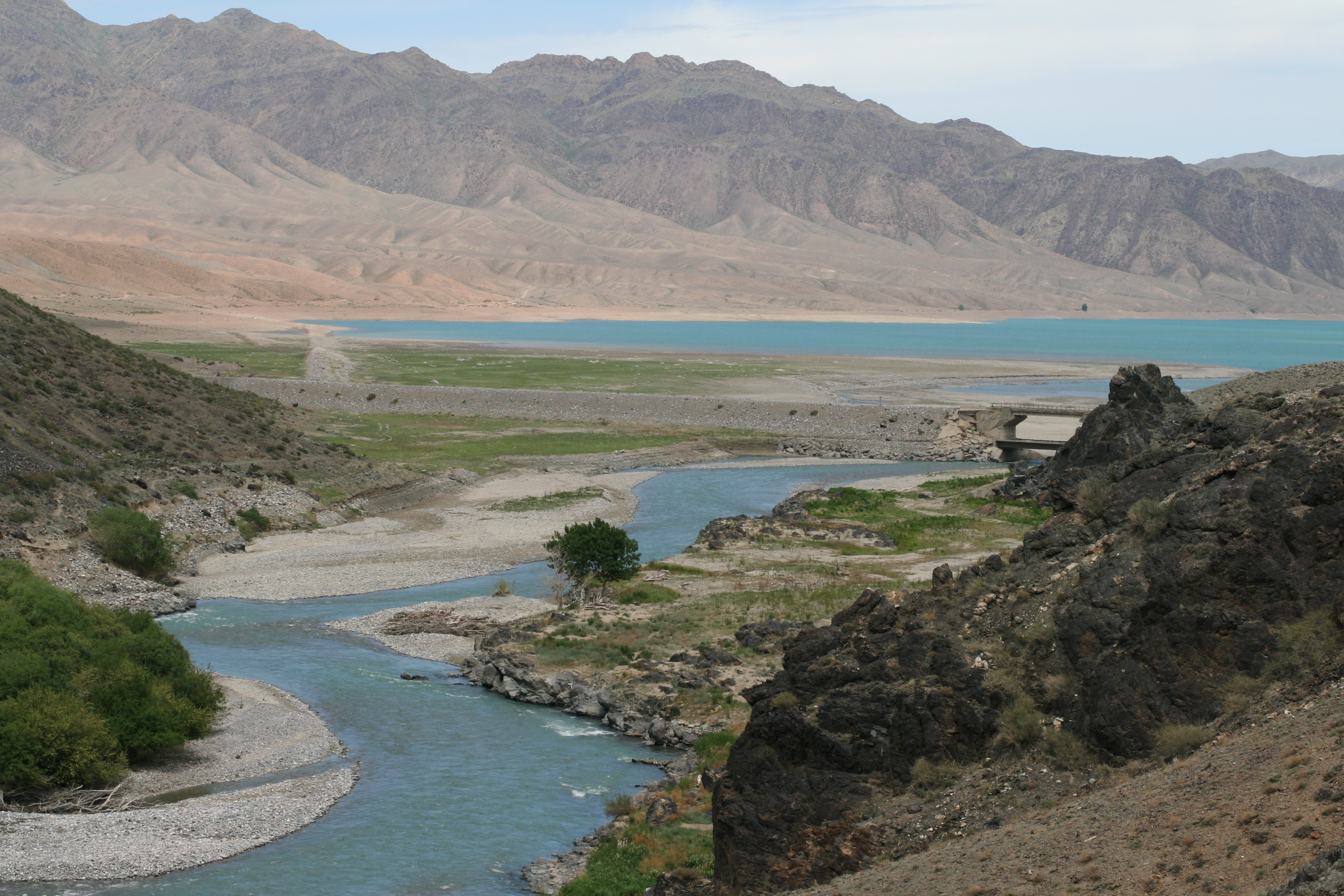
Canyon of the Chilik River (May 2013)

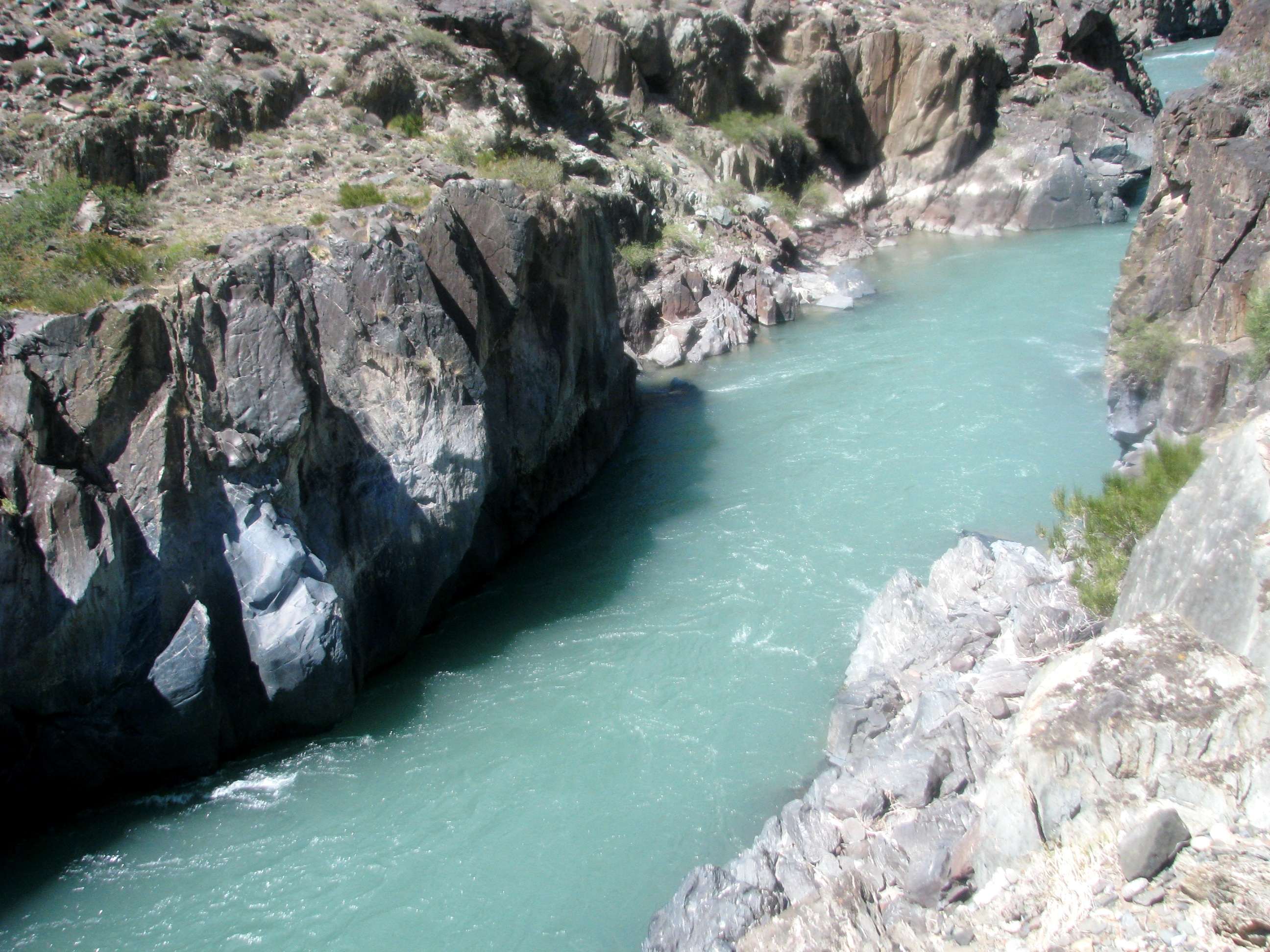
Canyon of the Chilik River. (May, 2013)

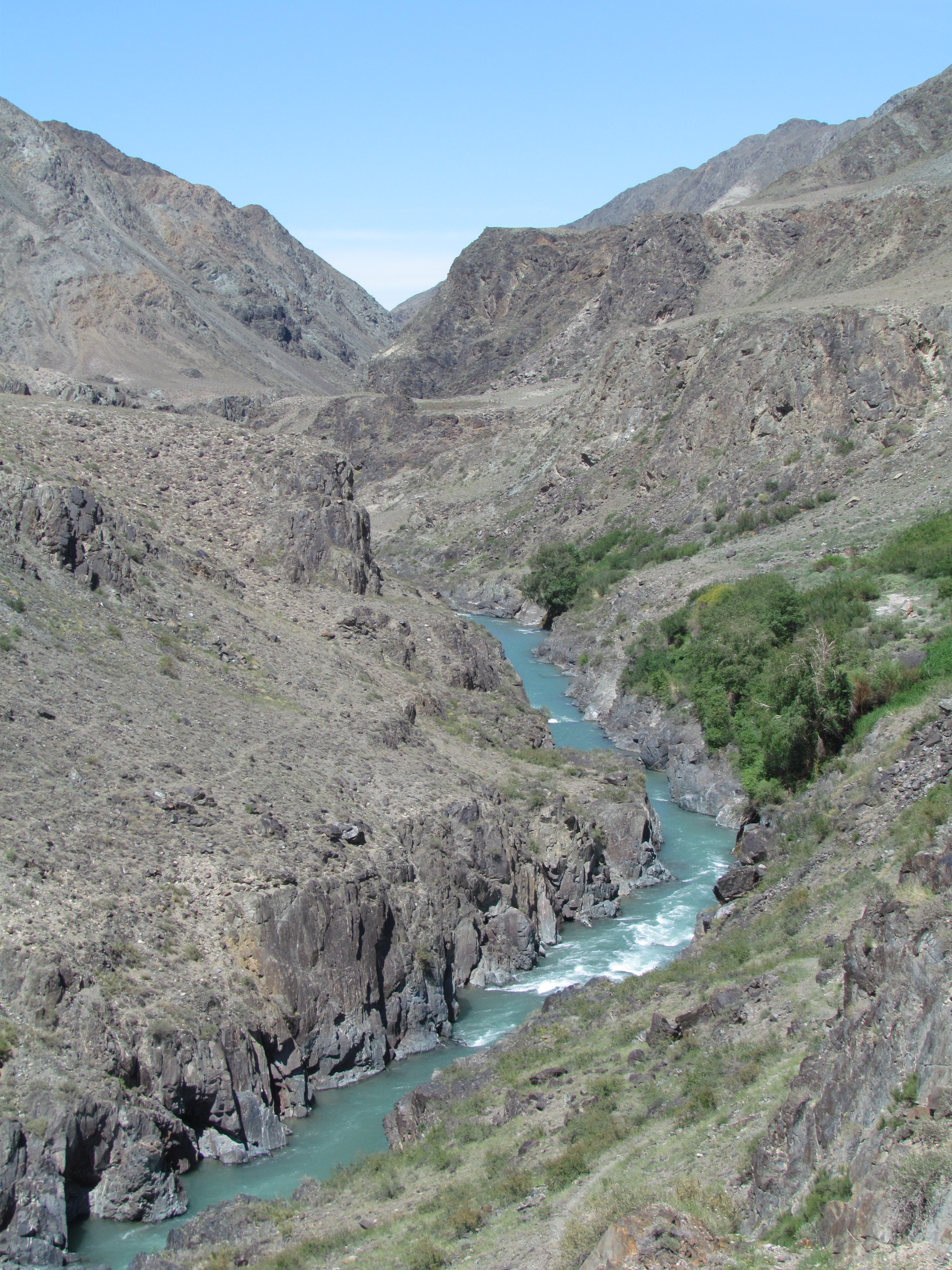
Canyon of the Chilik River. (May, 2013)

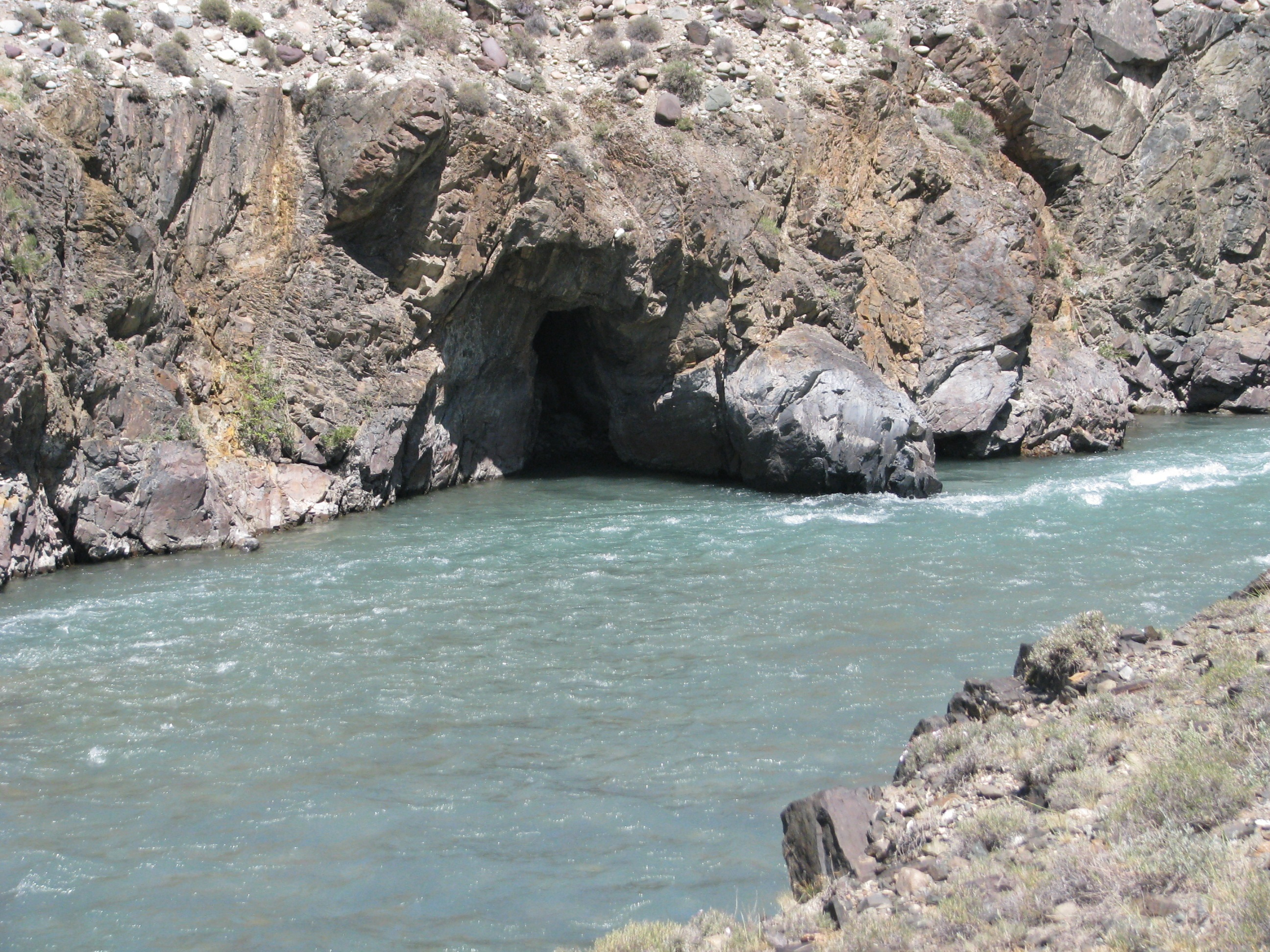
The shore of the river Chilik. Cave in the slope (May 2013)

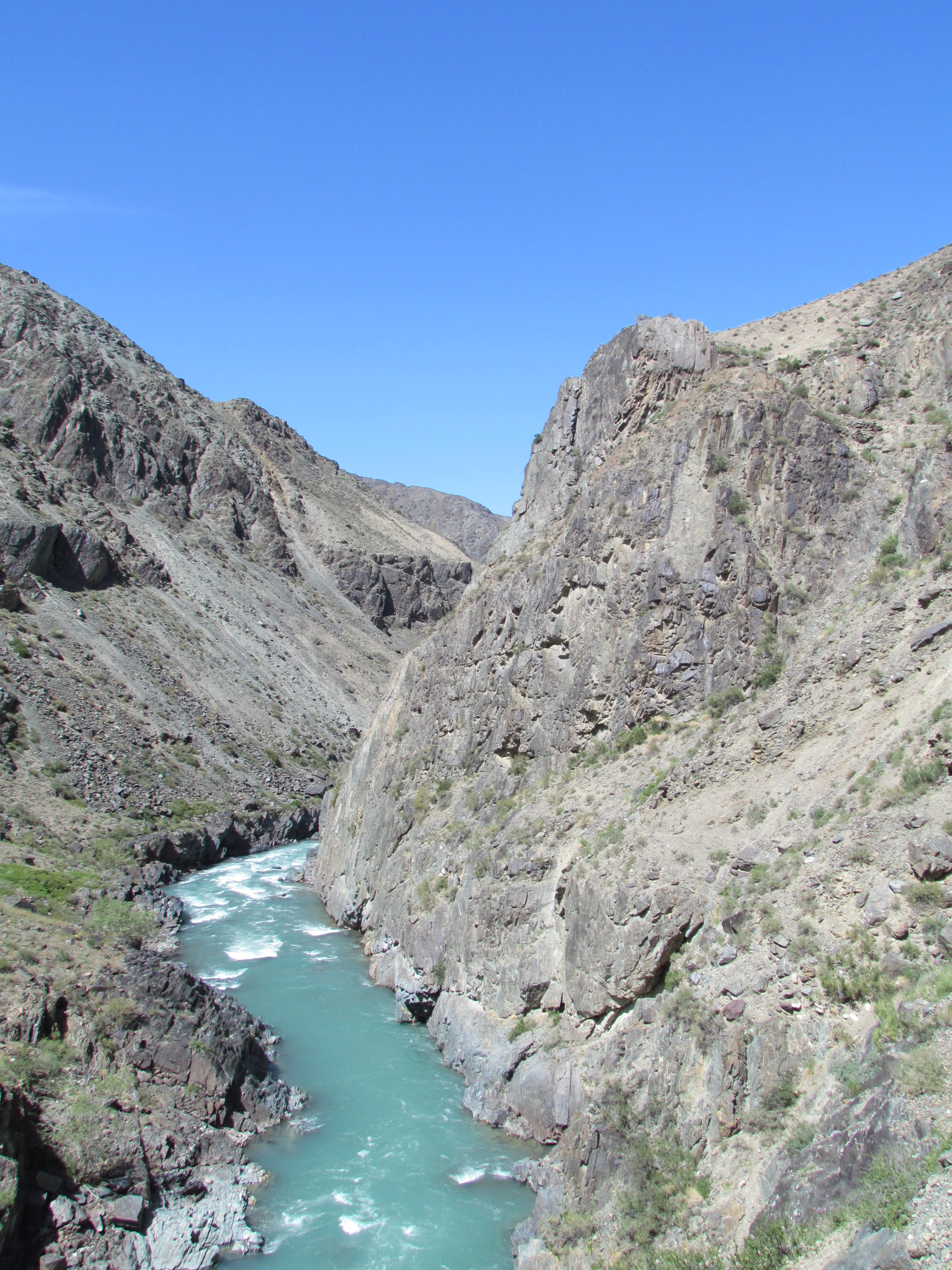
Canyon of the Chilik River. Cliffs on the shore (May 2013)
