= Rudnichny, Kazakhstan =

Rudnichny
- Village
- Location in Kazakhstan
- Coordinates: 44°40′19″N 78°54′17″E
- Country: Kazakhstan
- Region: Jetisu Region
- Time zone: UTC+6 (Omsk Time)

Rudnichny is a village in Jetisu Region, in south-eastern Kazakhstan.
