= Koksu =

Koksu (lit. 'blue water' in Turkic languages) may refer to the following places:

== Places ==
- Koksu, Kerbulak District, Jetisu Region, Kazakhstan
- Koksu, Koksu District, Jetisu Region, Kazakhstan
- Koksu, Maktaaral District, Turkistan Region, Kazakhstan
- Koksu, Shardara District, Turkistan Region, Kazakhstan
- Koksu, Karaganda Region, Kazakhstan

== Rivers ==
- Koksu (Karatal), river in Almaty Region, Kazakhstan
- Koksu (Argut), river in Altai Mountains, left tributary of Argut
- Koksu (Teba), river in Kemerovo Oblast, Russia, right tributary of Teba River
- Koksuv, river in Uzbekistan, right tributary of Chatkal

== Other ==
- Koksu District, Jetisu Region, Kazakhstan
- Koksu Ridge by the border of Kazakhstan and Altai Republic, Russia
- Koksu Canal, canal passing through Koksu and Karatal districts of Zhetisu Region, Kazakhstan
