= Meizoseismal area =

Area of maximum damage in an earthquake

The meizoseismal area in an earthquake is the area of maximum damage. For example, in the Charleston, South Carolina, earthquake of 1886, the meizoseismal area was an area about twenty by thirty miles stretching northeast between Charleston and Jedburg and incorporating Summerville. The estimated epicenter was near Middleton Place.
