= Koksu District =

Coordinates: 45.0039°N 77.942°E

Koksu
- District
- Көксу ауданы
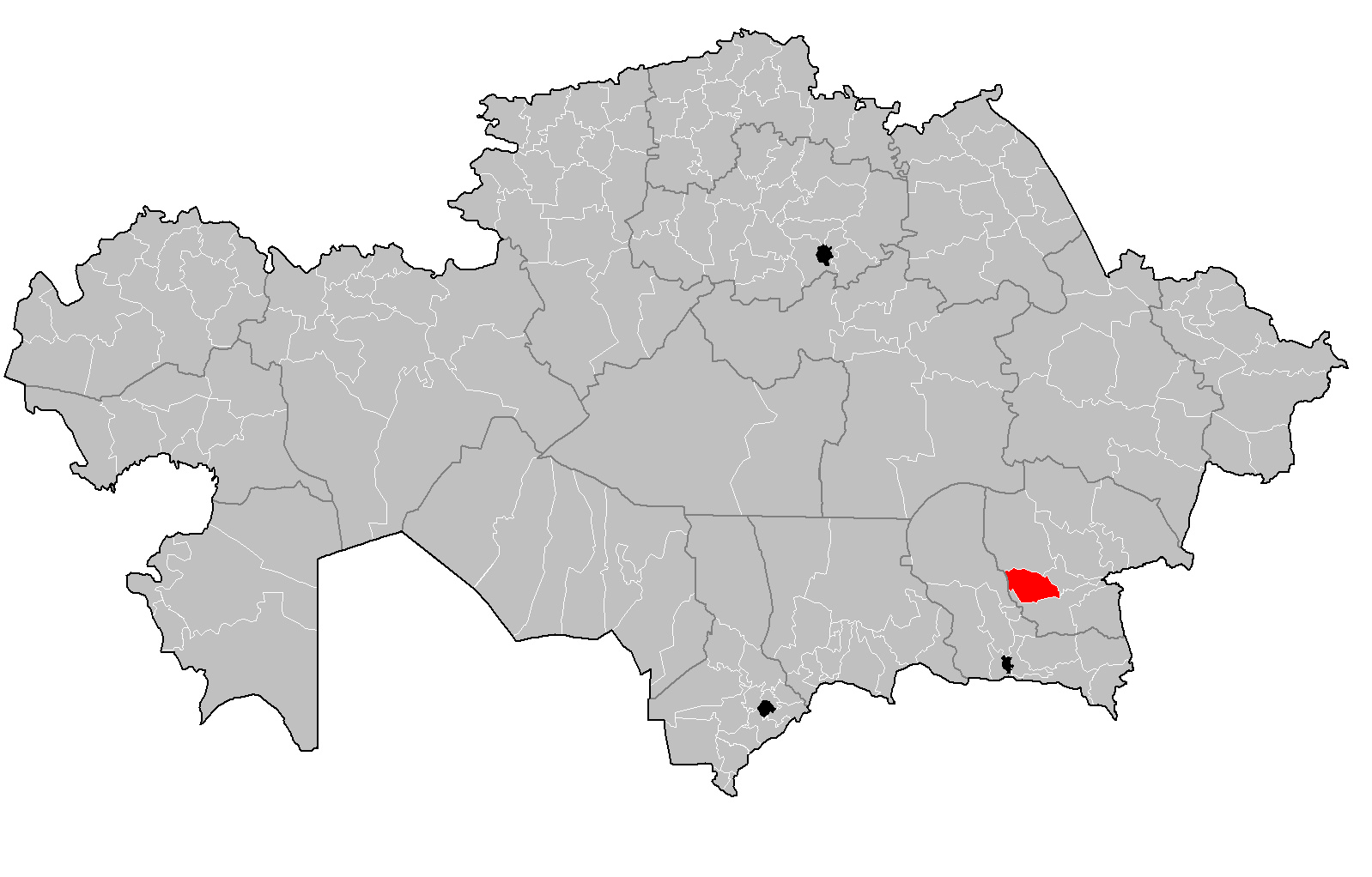
- Country: Kazakhstan
- Region: Jetisu Region
- Administrative center: Balpyk Bi
- Founded: 1944

Government
  - Akim (mayor): Kolbaev Marlene Kapashovich

Area
  - Total: 2,700 sq mi (7,100 km^{2})

Population (2013)
  - Total: 39,617
- Time zone: UTC+6 (East)

Koksu District (Kazakh: Көксу ауданы, Köksu audany) is a district of Jetisu Region in Kazakhstan. The administrative center of the district is the settlement of Balpyk Bi. It is named after the largest river in the area: Koksu River. Its population over the years has been 39,617 (2013 estimate); 38,417 (2009 census results); 40,105 (1999 census results).
