= Medvedev–Sponheuer–Karnik scale =

Earthquake intensity scale

The Medvedev–Sponheuer–Karnik scale, also known as the MSK or MSK-64, is a macroseismic intensity scale used to evaluate the severity of ground shaking on the basis of observed effects in an area where an earthquake transpires.

The scale was first proposed by Sergei Medvedev (USSR), Wilhelm Sponheuer (East Germany), and Vít Kárník (Czechoslovakia) in 1964. It was based on the experiences being available in the early 1960s from the application of the Modified Mercalli intensity scale and the 1953 version of the Medvedev scale, known also as the GEOFIAN scale.

With minor modifications in the mid-1970s and early 1980s, the MSK scale became widely used in Europe and the USSR. In early 1990s, the European Seismological Commission (ESC) used many of the principles formulated in the MSK in the development of the European macroseismic scale, which is now a de facto standard for evaluation of seismic intensity in European countries. MSK-64 is still being used in India, Israel, Russia, and throughout the Commonwealth of Independent States.

== Medvedev–Sponheuer–Karnik scale ==
The Medvedev–Sponheuer–Karnik scale is somewhat similar to the Modified Mercalli (MM) scale used in the United States. The MSK scale has 12 intensity degrees expressed in Roman numerals (to prevent the use of decimals):

I. Not perceptible	Not felt, registered only by seismographs. No effect on objects. No damage to buildings.
II. Hardly perceptible	Felt only by individuals at rest. No effect on objects. No damage to buildings.
III. Weak	Felt indoors by a few. Hanging objects swing slightly. No damage to buildings.
IV. Largely observed	Felt indoors by many and felt outdoors only by very few. A few people are awakened. Moderate vibration. Observers feel a slight trembling or swaying of the building, room, bed, chair, etc. China, glasses, windows, and doors rattle. Hanging objects swing. Light furniture shakes visibly in a few cases. No damage to buildings.
V. Fairly strong	Felt indoors by most, outdoors by few. A few people are frightened and run outdoors. Many sleeping people awake. Observers feel a strong shaking or rocking of the whole building, room, or furniture. Hanging objects swing considerably. China and glasses clatter together. Doors and windows swing open or shut. In a few cases, window panes break. Liquids oscillate and may spill from fully filled containers. Animals indoors may become uneasy. Slight damage to a few poorly constructed buildings.
VI. Strong	Felt by most indoors and by many outdoors. A few persons lose their balance. Many people are frightened and run outdoors. Small objects may fall and furniture may be shifted. Dishes and glassware may break. Farm animals may be frightened. Visible damage to masonry structures, cracks in plaster. Isolated cracks on the ground.
VII. Very strong	Most people are frightened and try to run outdoors. Furniture is shifted and may be overturned. Objects fall from shelves. Water splashes from containers. Serious damage to older buildings, masonry chimneys collapse. Small landslides.
VIII. Damaging	Many people find it difficult to stand, even outdoors. Furniture may be overturned. Waves may be seen on very soft ground. Older structures partially collapse or sustain considerable damage. Large cracks and fissures open up rockfalls.
IX. Destructive	General panic. People may be forcibly thrown to the ground. Waves are seen on soft ground. Substandard structures collapse. Substantial damage to well-constructed structures. Underground pipelines ruptured. Ground fracturing, widespread landslides.
X. Devastating	Masonry buildings destroyed, infrastructure crippled. Massive landslides. Water bodies may be overtopped, causing flooding of the surrounding areas and formation of new water bodies.
XI. Catastrophic	Most buildings and structures collapse. Widespread ground disturbances, tsunamis.
XII. Very catastrophic	All surface and underground structures completely destroyed. Landscape generally changed, rivers change paths, tsunamis.
