= 2011 Turkey earthquake =

2011 Turkey earthquake may refer to:

- 2011 Kütahya earthquake in May, two deaths
- 2011 Van earthquake in October, several hundred deaths, with aftershocks in November

== See also ==
- List of earthquakes in Turkey
