= List of earthquakes in 2011 =

Earthquakes in 2011
Approximate epicenters of notable earthquakes in 2011
- 4.0–5.9 magnitude
- 6.0–6.9 magnitude
- 7.0–7.9 magnitude
- 8.0+ magnitude
- Strongest: 9.1 M_{w}Japan
- Deadliest: 9.1 M_{w}Japan; 19,747 deaths
- Total fatalities: 20,925

Number by magnitude
- 9.0+: 1
- 8.0–8.9: 0
- 7.0–7.9: 18
- 6.0–6.9: 204
- 5.0–5.9: 2271

Map of earthquakes in 2011

This is a list of earthquakes in 2011. Only earthquakes of magnitude 6 or above are included, unless they result in damage and/or casualties, or are notable for some other reason. Smaller events in remote areas will be excluded from the list as they wouldn't have generated significant media interest. All dates are listed according to UTC time. The 9.1 Tōhoku earthquake was the fourth most powerful ever recorded and triggered a massive tsunami (around 20,000 deaths). In a very seismically active year, many earthquakes caused damage in Turkey, New Zealand, Myanmar, India, and the United States.

== Compared to other years ==
Number of earthquakes worldwide for 2001–2011 []
| Magnitude | 2001 | 2002 | 2003 | 2004 | 2005 | 2006 | 2007 | 2008 | 2009 | 2010 | 2011 |
|---|---|---|---|---|---|---|---|---|---|---|---|
| 8.0–9.9 | 1 | 0 | 1 | 2 | 1 | 2 | 4 | 1 | 1 | 1 | 1 |
| 7.0–7.9 | 14 | 13 | 14 | 14 | 10 | 9 | 14 | 12 | 16 | 23 | 19 |
| 6.0–6.9 | 122 | 126 | 139 | 141 | 139 | 142 | 178 | 167 | 143 | 150 | 187 |
| 5.0–5.9 | 1,212 | 1,170 | 1,212 | 1,511 | 1,694 | 1,726 | 2,090 | 1,786 | 1,912 | 2,222 | 2,494 |
| 4.0–4.9 | 7,969 | 8,479 | 8,455 | 10,880 | 13,893 | 12,843 | 12,081 | 12,294 | 6,817 | 10,135 | 13,130 |
| Total | 9,319 | 9,788 | 9,823 | 12,551 | 15,738 | 14,723 | 14,367 | 14,261 | 8,891 | 12,536 | 15,831 |

== Overall ==
=== By death toll ===
| Rank | Death toll | Magnitude | Location | MMI | Depth (km) | Date |
|---|---|---|---|---|---|---|
| 1 | 19,747 | 9.1 | Japan, Tōhoku | IX (Violent) | 29.0 | March 11 |
| 2 | 604 | 7.1 | Turkey, Van | VIII (Severe) | 7.6 | October 23 |
| 3 | 185 | 6.3 | New Zealand, Christchurch | XI (Extreme) | 5.0 | February 22 |
| 4 | 151 | 6.9 | Myanmar, Shan | X (Extreme) | 10.0 | March 24 |
| 5 | 111 | 6.9 | India, Sikkim | VII (Very strong) | 19.7 | September 18 |
| 6 | 38 | 5.6 | Turkey, Van | VII (Very strong) | 5.0 | November 9 |
| 7 | 26 | 5.5 | China, Yunnan | VI (Strong) | 10.0 | March 10 |
| 8 | 14 | 6.2 | Uzbekistan, Sughd | VI (Strong) | 20.0 | July 19 |
| 9 | 10 | 6.7 | Indonesia, Aceh | VI (Strong) | 78.0 | September 5 |

- Note: At least 10 dead

=== By magnitude ===
| Rank | Magnitude | Death toll | Location | Date |
|---|---|---|---|---|
| 1 | 9.1 | 19,747 | Japan, Tōhoku | March 11 |
| 2 | 7.9 | 0 | Japan, Honshu | March 11 |
| 3 | 7.7 | 0 | Japan, Honshu | March 11 |
| 4 | 7.6 | 0 | New Zealand, Kermadec Islands | July 6 |
| 5 | 7.4 | 0 | New Zealand, Kermadec Islands | October 21 |
| 6 | 7.3 | 0 | Japan, Honshu | March 9 |
| 6 | 7.3 | 0 | Fiji, Ndoi Island | September 15 |
| 8 | 7.2 | 3 | Pakistan, Balochistan | January 18 |
| 8 | 7.2 | 0 | United States, Aleutian Islands | June 23 |
| 8 | 7.1 | 604 | Turkey, Van | October 23 |
| 11 | 7.1 | 0 | Chile, Araucanía Region | January 2 |
| 11 | 7.1 | 4 | Japan, Honshu | April 7 |
| 11 | 7.1 | 0 | Vanuatu, Port Vila | August 20 |
| 11 | 7.1 | 0 | Papua New Guinea, Lae | December 14 |
| 15 | 7.0 | 0 | Argentina, Santiago del Estero | January 1 |
| 15 | 7.0 | 0 | New Caledonia, Loyalty Islands | January 13 |
| 15 | 7.0 | 0 | Japan, Honshu | July 10 |
| 15 | 7.0 | 0 | Vanuatu, Port Vila | August 20 |
| 15 | 7.0 | 0 | Vanuatu, Isangel | September 3 |

- Note: At least 7.0 magnitude
- Note: Aftershocks of the 2011 Tōhoku earthquake and tsunami are included as they are still over magnitude 7.

== By month ==
=== January ===
January
- Strongest: 7.2 M_{w} Pakistan; 7.2 M_{w} Chile
- Deadliest: 7.2 M_{w} (Pakistan) Pakistan; 3 deaths
- Total fatalities: 3

Number by magnitude
- 8.0–8.9: 0
- 7.0–7.9: 4
- 6.0–6.9: 10

| Date | Country and location | M_{w} | Depth (km) | MMI | Notes | Casualties | |
| Date | Country and location | M_{w} | Depth (km) | MMI | Notes | Dead | Injured |
|---|---|---|---|---|---|---|---|
| 1 | Argentina, Santiago del Estero Province, 26 km north northeast of El Hoyo | 7.0 | 583.6 | V | — | — | — |
| 2 | Chile, Araucanía Region, 42 km north northwest of Carahue | 7.2 | 24.0 | VII | This was an aftershock to the 2010 Chile earthquake. | — | — |
| 5 | New Caledonia, offshore, southeast of the Loyalty Islands | 6.1 | 112.2 | — | — | — | — |
| 9 | Vanuatu, Tafea offshore, 110 km west northwest of Isangel | 6.5 | 22.0 | V | — | — | — |
| 9 | Vanuatu, Tafea offshore, 124 km west northwest of Isangel | 6.1 | 18.0 | IV | This was an aftershock to the 6.5 earthquake 7 hours earlier. | — | — |
| 12 | Japan offshore, Bonin Islands region | 6.4 | 512.0 | III | — | — | — |
| 13 | New Caledonia, Loyalty Islands offshore, 118 km north northeast of Tadine | 7.0 | 9.0 | V | — | — | — |
| 17 | Indonesia, South Sumatra offshore, 129 km south southwest of Pagar Alam | 6.0 | 36.0 | IV | — | — | — |
| 18 | Pakistan, Balochistan, 46 km west southwest of Dalbandin | 7.2 | 68.0 | VII | The 2011 Dalbandin earthquake damaged 200 homes near the epicentre. One person was killed by falling debris, and two others died from heart attacks in Quetta. This was the strongest in the country since the 2005 Kashmir earthquake. | 3 | — |
| 24 | Tajikistan, Gorno-Badakshan, 106 km west northwest of Murghob | 6.0 | 110.0 | V | — | — | — |
| 26 | Indonesia, Aceh offshore, 58 km east southeast of Sinabang | 6.1 | 23.0 | V | — | — | — |
| 27 | Iran, Kerman Province, 119 km south southeast of Bam | 6.2 | 10.0 | VII | This was an aftershock of the 2010 Hosseinabad earthquake. | — | — |
| 29 | Norway, Svalbard and Jan Mayen offshore, 75 km east of Olonkinbyen | 6.2 | 15.0 | — | — | — | — |
| 31 | Tonga, Tongatapu, offshore, 101 km south southwest of Vaini | 6.0 | 76.0 | V | — | — | — |

=== February ===
February
- Strongest: 6.9 M_{w} Chile
- Deadliest: 6.1 M_{w} (New Zealand) New Zealand; 185 deaths
- Total fatalities: 186

Number by magnitude
- 8.0–8.9: 0
- 7.0–7.9: 0
- 6.0–6.9: 17

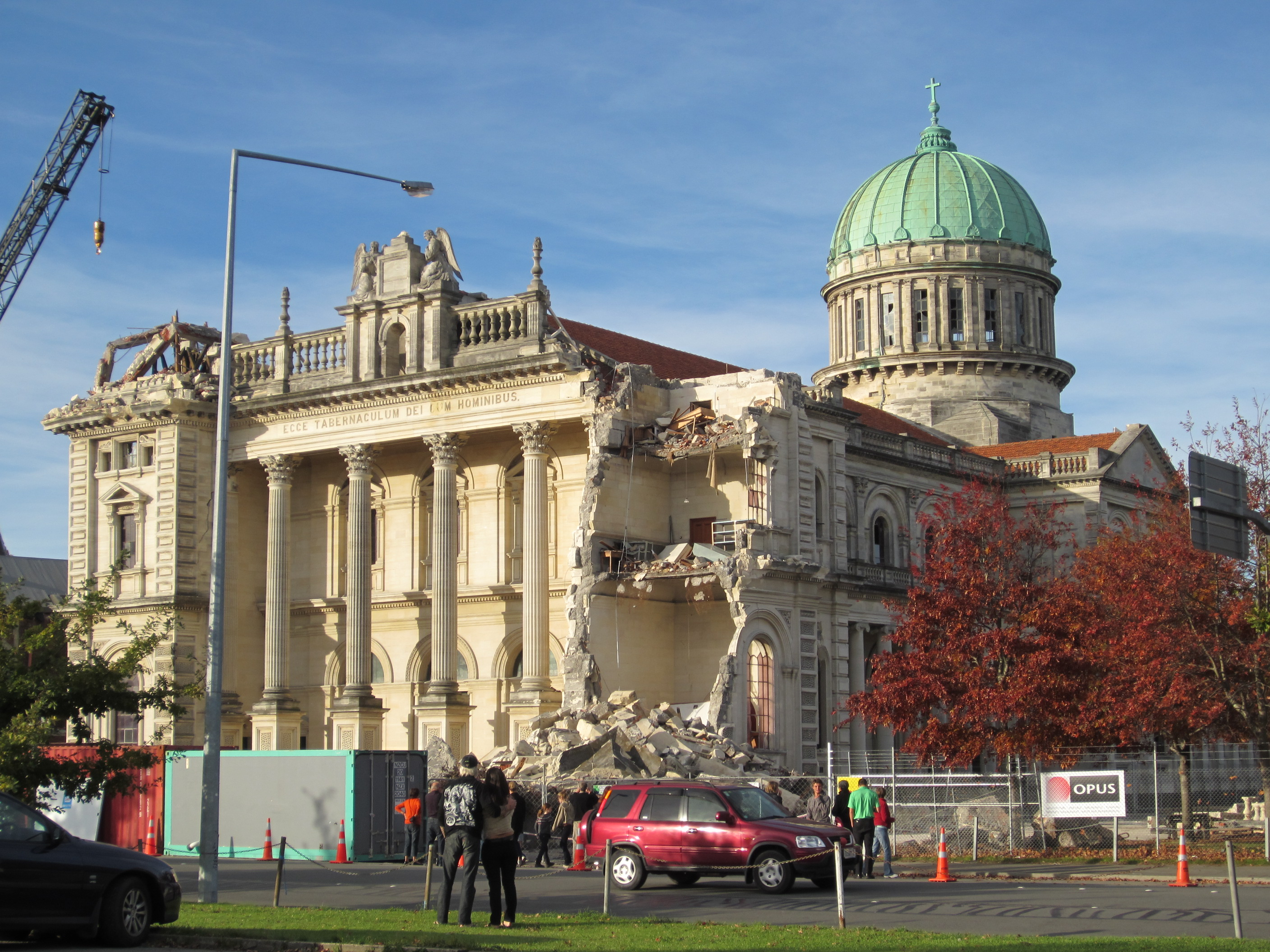
Damaged Catholic cathedral in New Zealand.

| Date | Country and location | M_{w} | Depth (km) | MMI | Notes | Casualties | |
| Date | Country and location | M_{w} | Depth (km) | MMI | Notes | Dead | Injured |
|---|---|---|---|---|---|---|---|
| 4 | Myanmar, Sagaing Region, 62 km east of Wangjing, India | 6.2 | 85.0 | VI | One person was killed and several buildings and bridges were damaged in Monywa, Myanmar. Some damage was also reported in Assam, India. | 1 | — |
| 7 | Papua New Guinea, Bougainville offshore, 98 km south southwest of Arawa | 6.4 | 415.0 | III | — | — | — |
| 10 | Philippines, Celebes Sea offshore, 250 km south southeast of Tabiauan | 6.6 | 525.0 | IV | — | — | — |
| 11 | Chile, Maule Region, 21 km north of Tomé | 6.9 | 26.0 | VII | A tsunami up to 0.3 m (0.98 ft) was observed off the coast of Chile. This was an aftershock of the 2010 Chile earthquake. | — | — |
| 12 | Chile, Bío-Bío Region, 13 km south southeast of Chiguayante | 6.1 | 16.0 | VII | It is also an aftershock of the 2010 Chile earthquake. | — | — |
| 15 | Indonesia, South Sulawesi, 146 km south southeast of Poso | 6.1 | 16.2 | VII | — | — | — |
| 20 | Russia, Kamchatka, 41 km south southwest of Ust-Kamchatsk | 6.1 | 33.0 | VI | — | — | — |
| 21 | Tonga, offshore, south of the Fiji Islands | 6.5 | 558.1 | — | — | — | — |
| 21 | New Zealand, Canterbury, 6 km southeast of Christchurch | 6.1 | 5.9 | XI | The 2011 Christchurch earthquake was one of the worst natural disasters in New Zealand's history. 185 people were killed, and 2,000 people were injured. This was also an aftershock of the 2010 Canterbury earthquake. | 185 | 2,000 |

Note: The 2010 Maule Earthquake's aftershocks have not been included due to cluttering.

=== March ===
March
- Strongest: 9.1 M_{w} Japan
- Deadliest: 9.1 M_{w} Japan 19,747 deaths
- Total fatalities: 19,924

Number by magnitude
- 9.0+: 1
- 8.0–8.9: 0
- 7.0–7.9: 3
- 6.0–6.9: 68
- 5.0–5.9: 633

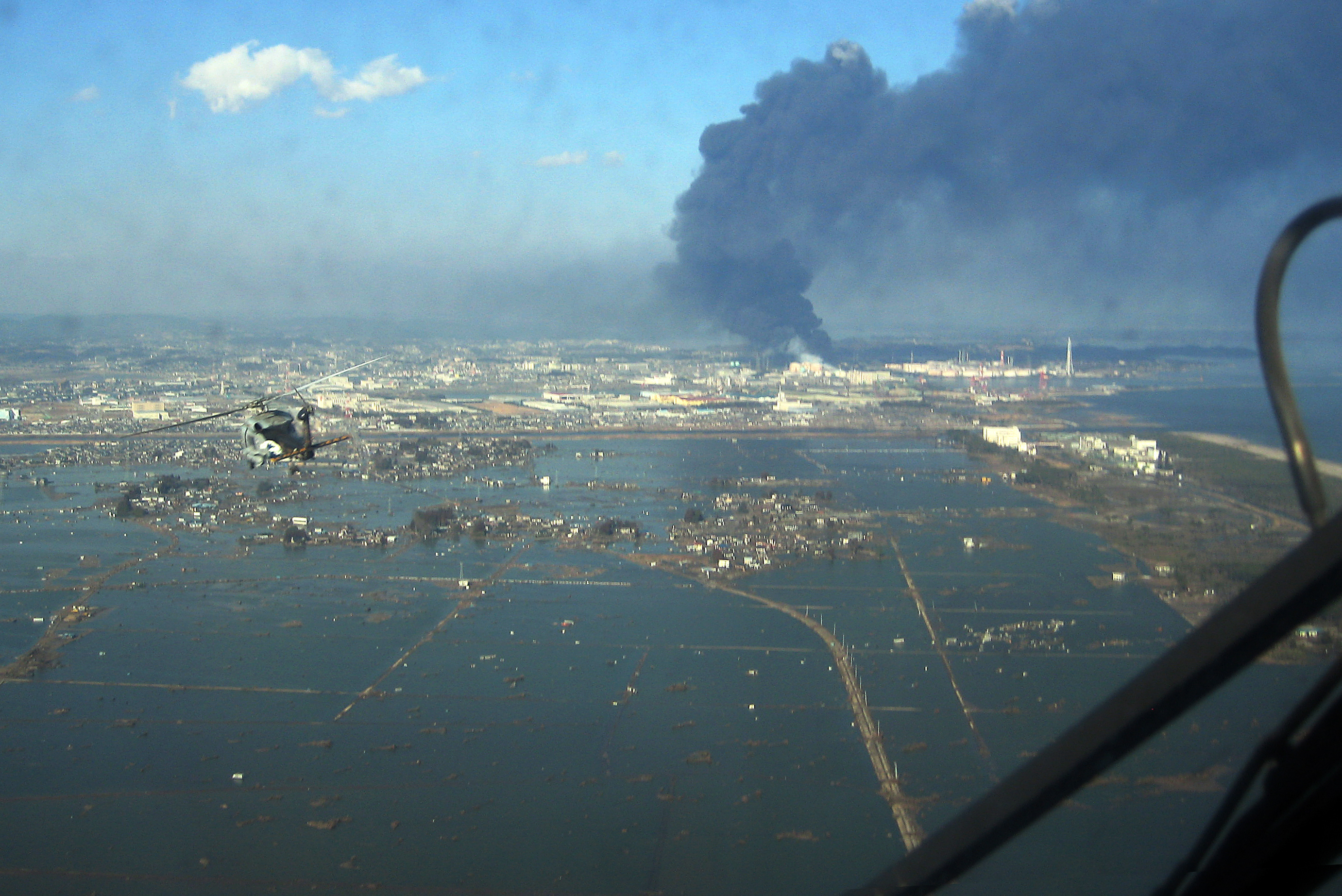
A helicopter flies over the port of Sendai to deliver food to survivors of the earthquake and tsunami in Japan.

| Date | Country and location | M_{w} | Depth (km) | MMI | Notes | Casualties | |
| Date | Country and location | M_{w} | Depth (km) | MMI | Notes | Dead | Injured |
|---|---|---|---|---|---|---|---|
| 6 | South Georgia and the South Sandwich Islands offshore | 6.6 | 87.7 | IV | — | — | — |
| 9 | Japan, Sendai offshore, 120 km Southeast of Ofunato | 7.3 | 32.0 | VI | The March 2011 Sanriku earthquake was a foreshock of the 9.1 earthquake 2 days later. | — | — |
| 10 | China, Yunnan | 5.5 | 10.0 | VII | The 2011 Yunnan earthquake damaged 12,000 homes, left 26 people dead and 313 injured. | 26 | 313 |
| 11 | Japan, Tōhoku Region offshore | 9.1 | 29.0 | IX | The 2011 Tohoku earthquake was the largest earthquake ever recorded in Japan, and is the fourth largest earthquake in recorded history, a tsunami up to 40.5 m (133 ft) high caused 19,745 deaths with 6,242 people injured, and 2,556 people missing. In Jayapura, Indonesia, one person was killed with another person killed in the U.S. State of California. | 19,747 | 6,434 |
| 11 | Japan, offshore Tōhoku Region | 7.9 | 42.6 | VIII | These were aftershocks of the 9.1 earthquake earlier that day. | — | — |
| 11 | Japan, offshore Tōhoku Region | 7.7 | 18.6 | IV | These were aftershocks of the 9.1 earthquake earlier that day. | — | — |
| 24 | Myanmar, 27 km Northwest of Tachilek | 6.9 | 8.0 | X | The 2011 Tarlay earthquake caused major destruction in Shan State, killing 151 people and injuring 212 others. | 151 | 212 |

Note: Aftershocks of the Japan earthquake have not been included unless they are above magnitude 7 or lead to casualties.

=== April ===
April
- Strongest: 7.1 M_{w} Japan
- Deadliest: 6.6 M_{w} Japan; 7 deaths
- Total fatalities: 12

Number by magnitude
- 7.0–7.9: 1
- 6.0–6.9: 18
- 5.0–5.9: 159

| Date | Country and location | M_{w} | Depth (km) | MMI | Notes | Casualties | |
| Date | Country and location | M_{w} | Depth (km) | MMI | Notes | Dead | Injured |
|---|---|---|---|---|---|---|---|
| 1 | Greece, South Aegean offshore, 42 km northwest of Fry | 6.0 | 59.9 | VI | — | — | — |
| 3 | Indonesia, West Java offshore, 278 km southwest of Kawalu | 6.7 | 14.0 | V | One person died of a heart attack in Cilacap. | 1 | — |
| 7 | Mexico, Veracruz, 7 km southwest of Helio García Alfaro | 6.6 | 166.2 | VI | — | — | — |
| 7 | Japan, Miyagi offshore, 29 km southeast of Ishinomaki | 7.1 | 42.0 | VIII | The April 2011 Miyagi earthquake caused further structural damage in Miyagi and Fukushima Prefectures. Four people died and 141 were injured. | 4 | 141 |
| 11 | Japan, Fukushima, 17 km south southwest of Ishikawa | 6.6 | 11.0 | VIII | The April 2011 Fukushima earthquake caused little structural damage, but killed seven people and injured ten others. Mostly from landslides. | 7 | 10 |
| 23 | Solomon Islands, Makira offshore, 79 km west of Kirakira | 6.8 | 79.0 | VI | — | — | — |
| 24 | Indonesia, Southeast Sulawesi offshore, 47 km northeast of Katabu | 6.1 | 8.0 | VIII | Fourteen people were injured, 38 houses and a school were destroyed in the South Konawe-Kendari area. | — | 14 |

=== May ===
May
- Strongest: 6.8 M_{w} New Caledonia
- Deadliest: 5.1 M_{w} Spain; 9 deaths
- Total fatalities: 11

Number by magnitude
- 9.0+: 0
- 8.0–8.9: 0
- 7.0–7.9: 0
- 6.0–6.9: 7
- 5.0–5.9: 179

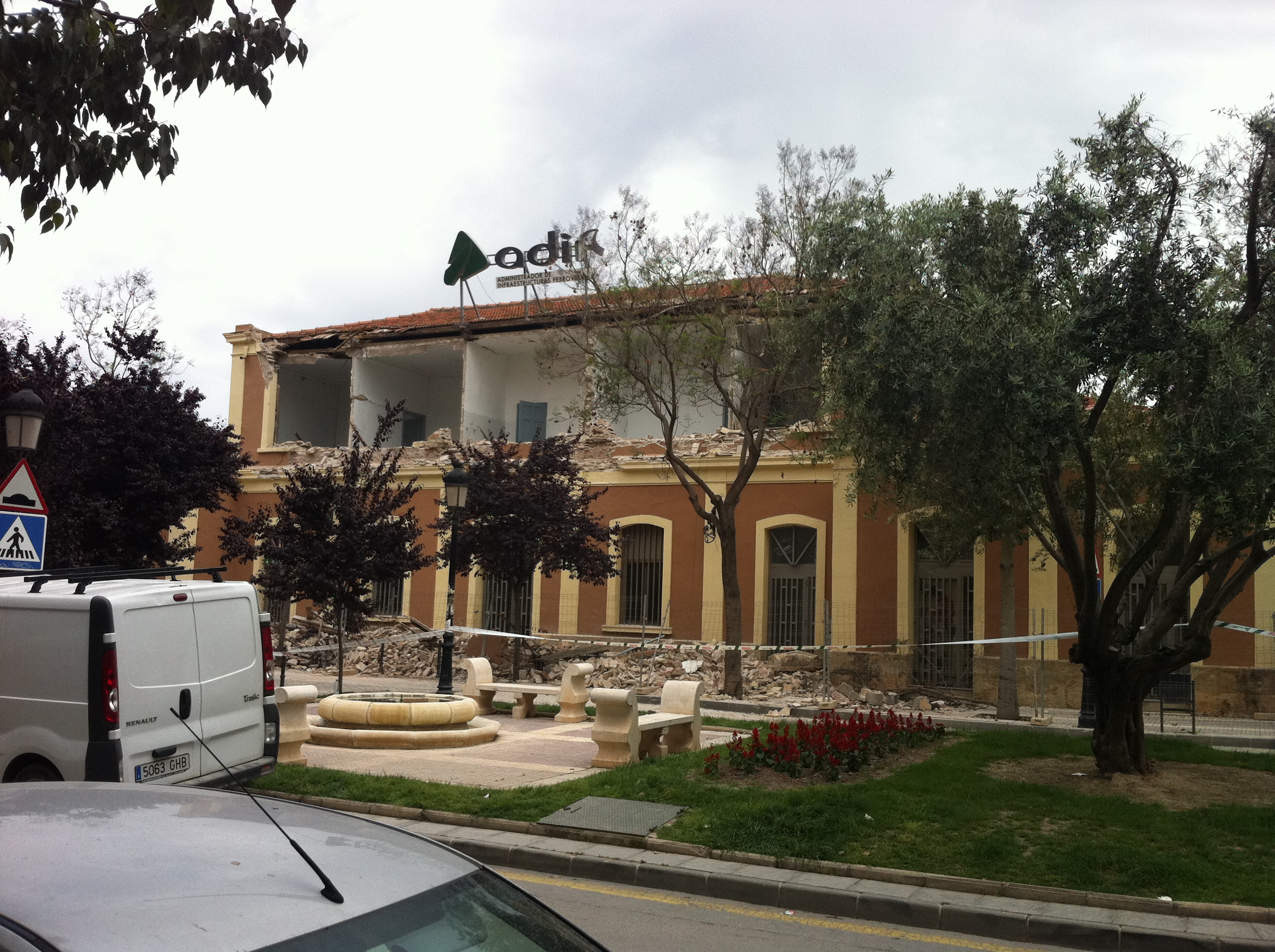
Damage to the Lorca-Sutullena railway station in Lorca in Spain.

| Date | Country and location | M_{w} | Depth (km) | MMI | Notes | Casualties | |
| Date | Country and location | M_{w} | Depth (km) | MMI | Notes | Dead | Injured |
|---|---|---|---|---|---|---|---|
| 10 | New Caledonia, Loyalty Islands offshore, 124 km northeast of Wé | 6.8 | 11.0 | V | — | — | — |
| 11 | Spain, Murcia, 4 km northeast of Lorca | 5.1 | 1.0 | VI | The 2011 Lorca earthquake caused significant localized damage and panic among locals, leaving many displaced from their homes. Nine people were killed and 403 others were injured. | 9 | 403 |
| 19 | Turkey, Kütahya, 12 km north northeast of Simav | 5.8 | 7.0 | VII | After the 2011 Kütahya earthquake, many locals panicked and power was lost to most of Simav, and some buildings sustained damage. An elderly woman in İnegöl suffered a heart-attack and died in the immediate aftermath of the tremor, while in Simav, one person was killed after being struck by a concrete block. 122 others were injured. | 2 | 122 |

=== June ===
June
- Strongest: 7.3 M_{w} United States
- Deadliest: 5.9 M_{w} New Zealand; 1 death 5.0 M_{w} Japan; 1 death
- Total fatalities: 2

Number by magnitude
- 7.0–7.9: 1
- 6.0–6.9: 13
- 5.0–5.9: 161

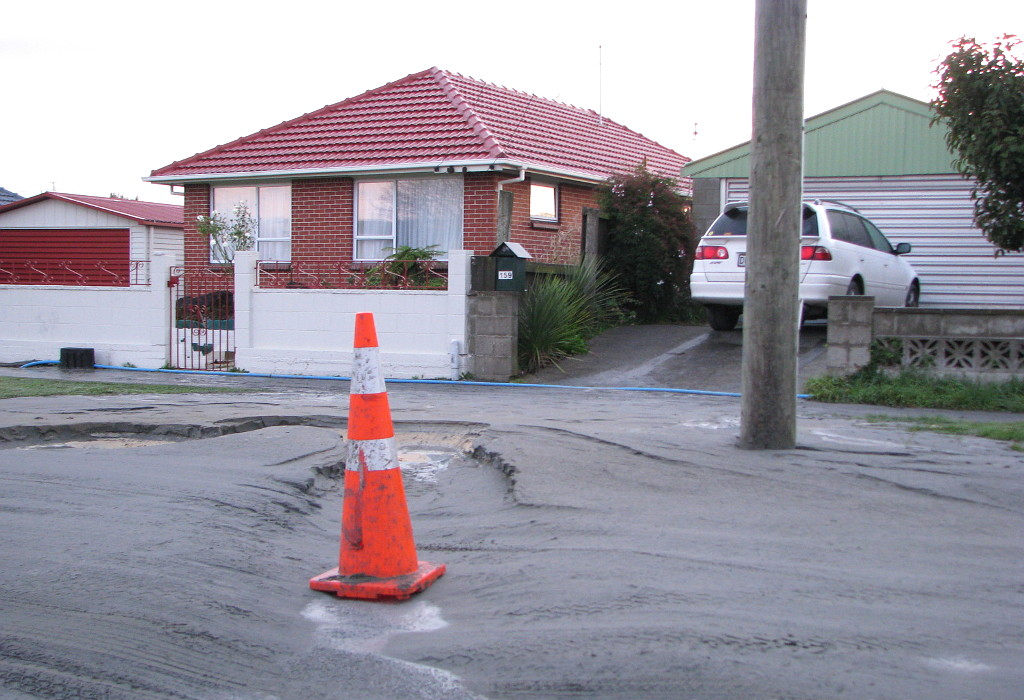
Soil liquefaction caused by the earthquake in New Zealand.

| Date | Country and location | M_{w} | Depth (km) | MMI | Notes | Casualties | |
| Date | Country and location | M_{w} | Depth (km) | MMI | Notes | Dead | Injured |
|---|---|---|---|---|---|---|---|
| 8 | China, Xinjiang, 76 km west of Turpan | 5.1 | 21.1 | VI | In Dabancheng, fifty houses were damaged and landslides occurred. At least eight people were injured. | — | 8 |
| 13 | New Zealand, Canterbury offshore, 9 km east southeast of Christchurch | 5.9 | 6.1 | VIII | The June 2011 Christchurch earthquake, being a strong aftershock of the February event, caused further damage to buildings, power outages, liquefaction and rockfalls. One elderly person died after falling in panic, and 46 others were injured, two seriously. | 1 | 46 |
| 16 | Papua New Guinea, East New Britain, 108 km east southeast of Kimbe | 6.4 | 16.0 | VIII | — | — | — |
| 20 | China, Yunnan, 137 km east southeast of Myitkyina, Myanmar | 5.0 | 39.0 | IV | Moderate damage occurred in Baoshan and four people were injured. | — | 4 |
| 22 | Japan, Iwate offshore, 42 km north northeast of Miyako | 6.7 | 33.0 | VI | This was possibly an aftershock of the March 2011 event. | — | — |
| 24 | United States, Alaska offshore, 162 km east of Atka | 7.3 | 52.0 | VI | In Nikolski, a tsunami with heights of 10 cm (0.33 ft) was observed. | — | — |
| 24 | Haiti, Sud-Est, 11 km north of Cayes-Jacmel | 3.5 | 10.0 | III | In Port-au-Prince, seven people were injured in a crowd-crush caused by panicking crowds. | — | 7 |
| 26 | China, Qinghai, 186 km northwest of Qamdo | 5.3 | 29.3 | V | Ten houses collapsed and over 90% of others were damaged near the epicentre. | — | — |
| 26 | Indonesia, Papua, 146 km south southeast of Biak | 6.3 | 17.0 | VII | — | — | — |
| 29 | Japan, Nagano, 20 km west southwest of Hotaka | 5.0 | 10.0 | V | In Nagano, one person was crushed to death by a falling bookshelf, and seventeen others were injured, fourteen of them seriously. | 1 | 17 |

=== July ===
July
- Strongest: 7.6 M_{w} New Zealand
- Deadliest: 6.1 M_{w} Kyrgyzstan; 14 deaths
- Total fatalities: 14

Number by magnitude
- 7.0–7.9: 2
- 6.0–6.9: 17
- 5.0–5.9: 205

| Date | Country and location | M_{w} | Depth (km) | MMI | Notes | Casualties | |
| Date | Country and location | M_{w} | Depth (km) | MMI | Notes | Dead | Injured |
|---|---|---|---|---|---|---|---|
| 6 | New Zealand, Kermadec Islands offshore | 7.6 | 17.0 | VII | A tsunami was observed with heights of 1.9 m (6.2 ft) in Raoul Island. | — | — |
| 10 | Japan, Miyagi offshore, 177 km east southeast of Ishinomaki | 7.0 | 23.0 | V | It was an aftershock of the event on March 11. | — | — |
| 11 | Philippines, Central Visayas offshore, 33 km west southwest of Cayhagan | 6.4 | 19.0 | VI | — | — | — |
| 19 | Kyrgyzstan, Batken, 16 km north northeast of Aydarken | 6.1 | 20.0 | VIII | The 2011 Fergana Valley earthquake caused fifteen injuries, as many as 650 houses to collapse or sustain severe damage and rockfalls in Kyrgyzstan. However, in Uzbekistan, over 800 homes were damaged and thirteen people were killed, while another person died due to panic in Tajikistan. | 14 | 101 |
| 20 | Solomon Islands, Makira offshore, 16 km northeast of Kirakira | 6.0 | 21.0 | VI | — | — | — |
| 25 | Papua New Guinea, New Ireland offshore, 70 km south southwest of Kavieng | 6.3 | 10.0 | VI | — | — | — |
| 29 | South of the Fiji Islands | 6.7 | 532.0 | — | — | — | — |
| 31 | Papua New Guinea, Madang offshore, 103 km northeast of Angoram | 6.6 | 10.0 | VI | — | — | — |

=== August ===
August
- Strongest: 7.2 M_{w} Vanuatu
- Total fatalities: 0

Number by magnitude
- 7.0–7.9: 3
- 6.0–6.9: 10
- 5.0–5.9: 146

| Date | Country and location | M_{w} | Depth (km) | MMI | Notes | Casualties | |
| Date | Country and location | M_{w} | Depth (km) | MMI | Notes | Dead | Injured |
|---|---|---|---|---|---|---|---|
| 11 | China, Xinjiang, 104 km east northeast of Kashgar | 5.6 | 10.0 | VII | At least 21 people were injured and moderate damage was reported in Kashgar. | — | 21 |
| 20 | Vanuatu, Shefa offshore, 71 km south southwest of Port Vila | 7.2 | 32.0 | VI | — | — | — |
| 20 | Vanuatu, Shefa offshore, 65 km south southwest of Port Vila | 6.5 | 35.0 | V | Aftershock of the 7.2 earthquake 18 minutes prior. | — | — |
| 20 | Vanuatu, Shefa offshore, 64 km south of Port Vila | 7.1 | 28.0 | VI | Aftershock of the 7.2 earthquake an hour prior. | — | — |
| 23 | United States, Colorado, 6 km south of Valdez | 5.3 | 4.0 | VII | The 2011 Colorado earthquake caused damage in Segundo, Cokedale, Valdez and Trinidad. Rockslides occurred on State Highway 12. | — | — |
| 23 | United States, Virginia, 11 km southwest of Mineral | 5.8 | 6.0 | VIII | The 2011 Virginia earthquake was felt by more people than any other quake in U.S. history, with tremors also being felt in Canada. Several people were injured and damage was reported in the states of Virginia, the capital Washington D.C., Delaware, Maryland, West Virginia, Pennsylvania, New Jersey, and New York. | — | Several |
| 24 | Peru, Ucayali, 64 km east southeast of Contamana | 7.0 | 147.0 | VI | — | — | — |
| 30 | Indonesia, Maluku offshore, 236 km north of Baukau | 6.9 | 469.8 | III | — | — | — |

=== September ===
September
- Strongest: 7.3 M_{w} Fiji
- Deadliest: 6.9 M_{w} India; 111 deaths
- Total fatalities: 125

Number by magnitude
- 7.0–7.9: 2
- 6.0–6.9: 16
- 5.0–5.9: 121

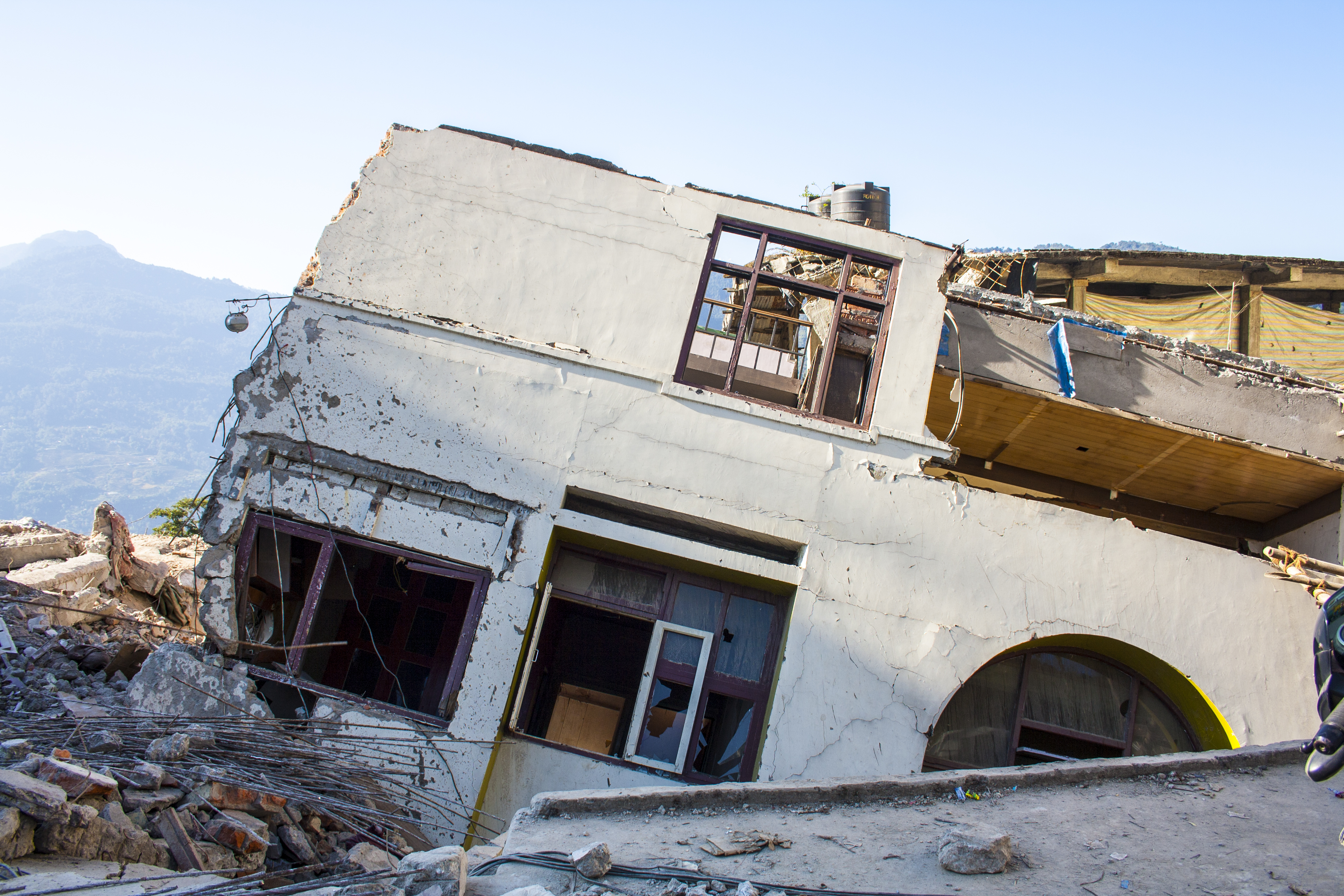
Demolished Building in Gangtok, Sikkim in India by the earthquake.

| Date | Country and location | M_{w} | Depth (km) | MMI | Notes | Casualties | |
| Date | Country and location | M_{w} | Depth (km) | MMI | Notes | Dead | Injured |
|---|---|---|---|---|---|---|---|
| 2 | United States, Alaska offshore, 170 km east of Atka | 6.9 | 32.0 | I | A tsunami with a wave height of 6 cm (0.20 ft) was recorded at Atka. | — | — |
| 2 | Argentina, Santiago Del Estero, 20 km west northwest of Añatuya | 6.7 | 578.9 | III | — | — | — |
| 3 | Vanuatu, Tafea offshore, 133 km south southeast of Isangel | 7.0 | 185.1 | V | — | — | — |
| 5 | Indonesia, Aceh, 68 km west southwest of Kabanjahe | 6.7 | 91.0 | VI | The 2011 Aceh earthquake killed ten people and caused damage in Singkil. | 10 | — |
| 7 | India, Delhi, 6 km northeast of Pitampura | 4.3 | 10.0 | V | One person was injured and some minor damage occurred in the Delhi area. | — | 1 |
| 9 | Canada, British Columbia offshore, 66 km southwest of Vernon | 6.4 | 22.0 | VII | — | — | — |
| 15 | Fiji, Lau offshore, 412 km south southeast of Levuka | 7.3 | 644.6 | II | — | — | — |
| 16 | Japan, Iwate offshore, 99 km northeast of Miyako | 6.7 | 30.0 | V | Aftershock of the 2011 Tōhoku earthquake. | — | — |
| 19 | India, Sikkim, 43 km northwest of Mangan | 6.9 | 50.0 | VIII | The 2011 Sikkim earthquake caused widespread damage in several countries in south and central Asia. At least 97 people were killed and many buildings collapsed in the Indian states of Sikkim, Bihar and West Bengal, while six people were killed in Nepal. Seven additional fatalities occurred in Tibet, China, while minor damage was reported in Bhutan and Bangladesh. | 111 | — |
| 19 | Guatemala, Santa Rosa, 3 km east of Santa María Ixhuatán | 5.6 | 9.0 | VII | Three people were killed by landslides, another person was killed by a wall collapse and 40 others were injured in Guatemala City. At least 11 houses were destroyed and 400 others were damaged. | 4 | 40 |

=== October ===
October
- Strongest: 7.4 M_{w} New Zealand
- Deadliest: 7.1 M_{w} Turkey; 604 deaths
- Total fatalities: 608

Number by magnitude
- 7.0–7.9: 2
- 6.0–6.9: 9
- 5.0–5.9: 122

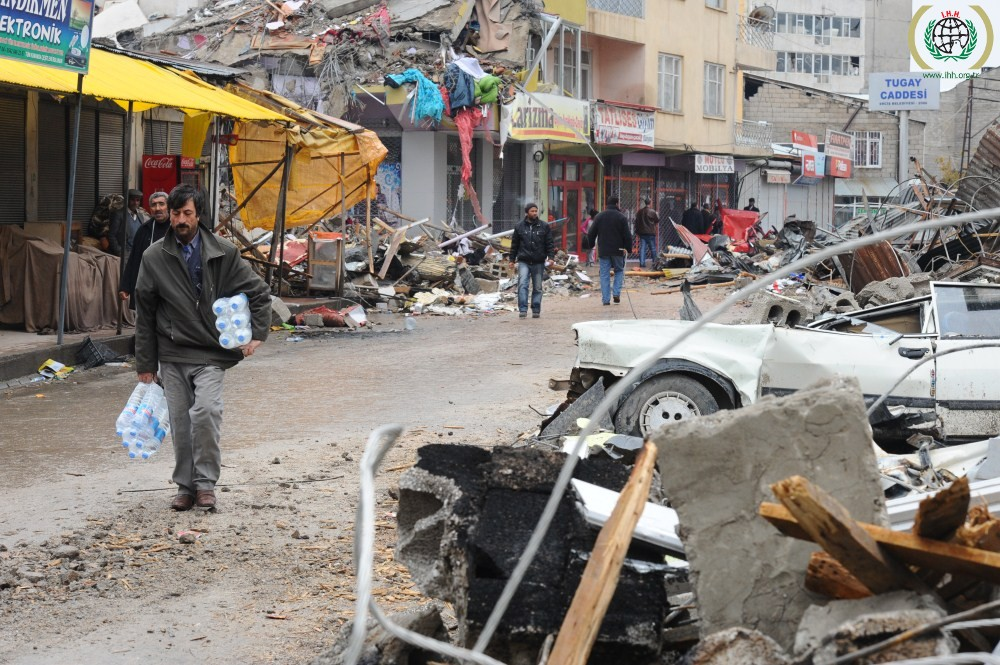
Collapsed structures and damaged car in Van almost a week after the earthquake in Turkey

| Date | Country and location | M_{w} | Depth (km) | MMI | Notes | Casualties | |
| Date | Country and location | M_{w} | Depth (km) | MMI | Notes | Dead | Injured |
|---|---|---|---|---|---|---|---|
| 7 | Japan, central Honshu | 2.4 | — | — | One person was killed by falling rocks while mountain climbing. | 1 | — |
| 13 | Indonesia, Bali offshore, 88 km southwest of Jimbaran | 6.1 | 39.0 | V | At least 43 people were injured in southern Bali. | — | 43 |
| 14 | Papua New Guinea, Morobe offshore, 4 km east southeast of Finschhafen | 6.5 | 37.0 | VI | — | — | — |
| 14 | Russia, Amur, 8 km east southeast of Takhtamygda | 6.0 | 12.0 | VIII | Some minor damage and power outages were reported near the epicenter. | — | — |
| 18 | Papua New Guinea, East New Britain, 102 km east southeast of Kimbe | 6.1 | 26.0 | VI | — | — | — |
| 20 | India, Gujarat, 15 km southeast of Mendarda | 5.1 | 10.0 | VII | Over 3,000 buildings were damaged and 34 people were injured. | — | 34 |
| 21 | New Zealand, Kermadec Islands offshore | 7.4 | 33.0 | III | — | — | — |
| 23 | Turkey, Van, 27 km north northeast of Van | 7.1 | 18.0 | VIII | At least 604 people were killed, 4,152 others were injured, 40,000 were displaced, 5,739 buildings collapsed and 4,882 others were damaged in the 2011 Van earthquake. Telecommunications, electricity and water services were disrupted. Surface faulting and liquefaction were also observed. | 604 | 4,152 |
| 28 | Peru, Ica, 39 km southwest of Santiago | 6.9 | 24.0 | VIII | One person died, 103 others were injured and 134 buildings were destroyed at Ica. | 1 | 103 |
| 29 | India, Sikkim, 15 km north northeast of Gangtok | 3.5 | 10.0 | III | One person died after falling from a bridge and another died from a heart attack in the epicentral area. | 2 | — |
| 29 | Ecuador, Pichincha, 20 km east northeast of Quito | 4.0 | 3.0 | IV | Some minor damage and landslides occurred near Quito. | – | — |
| 31 | China, Sichuan, 48 km west northwest of Guangyuan | 5.0 | 39.5 | II | Some barns collapsed and roof tiles fell from older houses in Qingchuan County. | — | — |

=== November ===
November
- Strongest: 6.9 M_{w} Japan
- Deadliest: 5.6 M_{w} Turkey; 38 deaths
- Total fatalities: 38

Number by magnitude
- 9.0+: 0
- 8.0–8.9: 0
- 7.0–7.9: 0
- 6.0–6.9: 10
- 5.0–5.9: 135

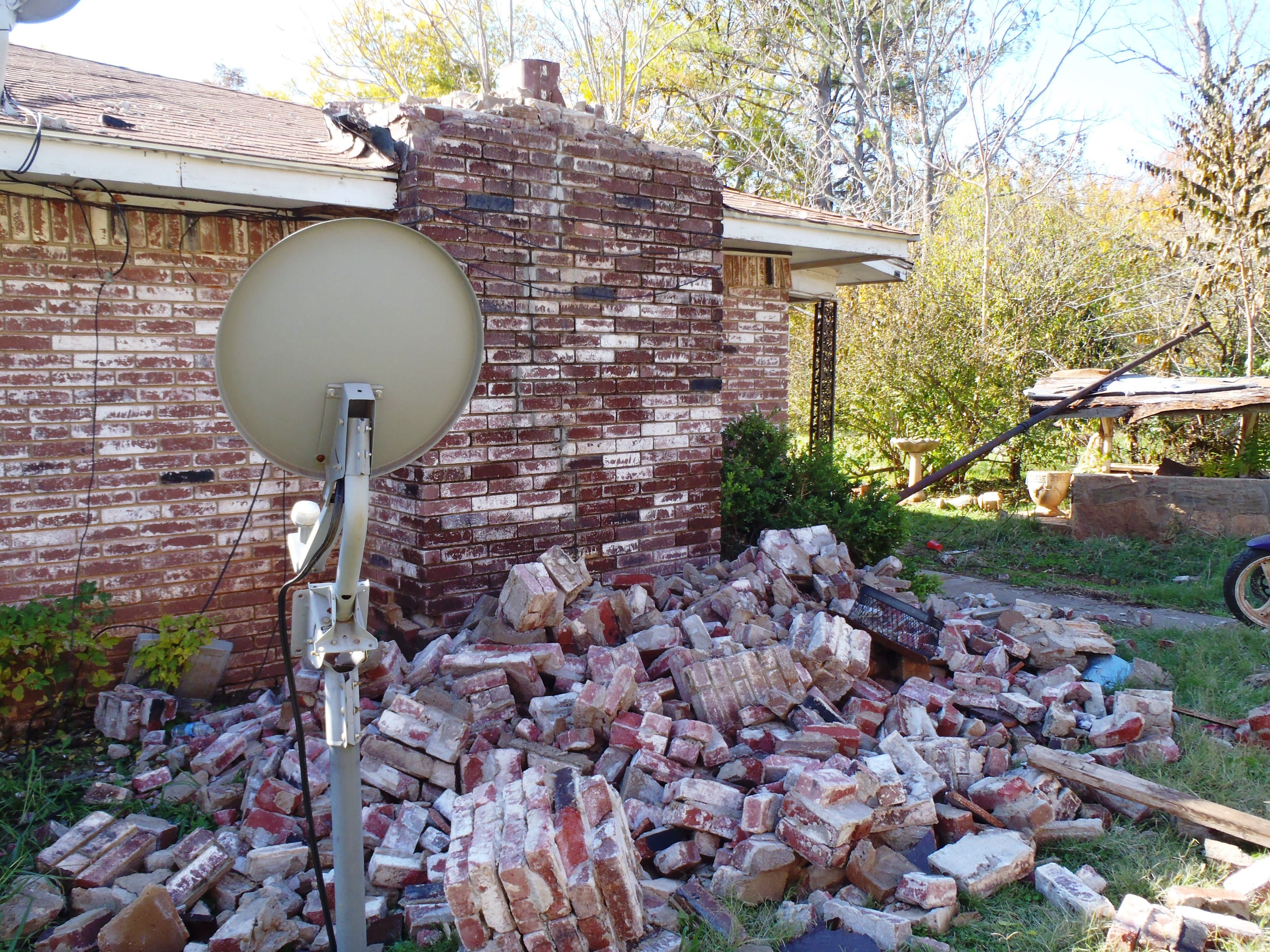
Chimney damage from the earthquake in Oklahoma.

| Date | Country and location | M_{w} | Depth (km) | MMI | Notes | Casualties | |
| Date | Country and location | M_{w} | Depth (km) | MMI | Notes | Dead | Injured |
|---|---|---|---|---|---|---|---|
| 1 | China, Xinjiang, 70 km west northwest of Xinyuan | 5.6 | 28.0 | VI | At least 2,453 houses collapsed, 66,000 others were damaged, about 148,500 people were affected and 1,101 livestock were killed in Xinjiang. | — | — |
| 6 | United States, Oklahoma, 8 km northwest of Prague | 5.7 | 5.2 | VIII | Due to the 2011 Oklahoma earthquake, two people were injured, 14 homes were destroyed and many others were damaged in the epicentral area. Parts of US Highway 62 between Meeker and Prague buckled by shaking along pre-existing cracks. | — | 2 |
| 8 | United States, Oklahoma, 9 km south southeast of Sparks | 4.8 | 5.0 | VI | Aftershock of the 2011 Oklahoma earthquake. Some additional homes were damaged. | — | — |
| 8 | Japan, Okinawa offshore, 238 km west northwest of Naha | 6.9 | 224.9 | V | — | — | — |
| 9 | Turkey, Van, 2 km west northwest of Edremit | 5.6 | 5.0 | VII | Aftershock of the 2011 Van earthquake. Some additional buildings collapsed in Van, killing 38 people and injuring 260 others. | 38 | 260 |
| 14 | Indonesia, North Maluku offshore, 199 km south southwest of Ternate | 6.3 | 17.0 | VII | — | — | — |
| 22 | Bolivia, Beni, 62 km south southwest of Trinidad | 6.6 | 549.9 | III | — | — | — |

=== December ===
December
- Strongest: 7.1 M_{w} Papua New Guinea
- Deadliest: 6.5 M_{w} Mexico; 3 deaths
- Total fatalities: 3

Number by magnitude
- 9.0+: 0
- 8.0–8.9: 0
- 7.0–7.9: 1
- 6.0–6.9: 7
- 5.0–5.9: 106

| Date | Country and location | M_{w} | Depth (km) | MMI | Notes | Casualties | |
| Date | Country and location | M_{w} | Depth (km) | MMI | Notes | Dead | Injured |
|---|---|---|---|---|---|---|---|
| 1 | China, Xinjiang, 33 km west southwest of Shache | 4.9 | 31.5 | IV | At least 300 homes in Kashgar sustained moderate damage. | — | — |
| 11 | Mexico, Guerrero, 6 km south southwest of Nuevo Balsas | 6.5 | 59.0 | VII | At least three people were killed, ten were injured, many homes were damaged and landslides occurred in the 2011 Zumpango earthquake. | 3 | 10 |
| 14 | Papua New Guinea, Morobe, 25 km south southeast of Wau | 7.1 | 135.0 | VI | — | — | — |
| 23 | New Zealand, Canterbury, 14 km east northeast of Christchurch | 5.8 | 9.7 | VIII | The December 2011 Christchurch earthquake injured sixty people and damaged a few buildings. | 1 (indirect) | 60 |
| 26 | Russia, Tuva, 45 km north northeast of Saryg-Sep | 6.6 | 15.0 | VII | Many buildings were damaged and 1,600 people were evacuated in the epicentral area. | — | — |
