= Carlsberg Fault zone =

Concealed tectonic formation that runs across Copenhagen

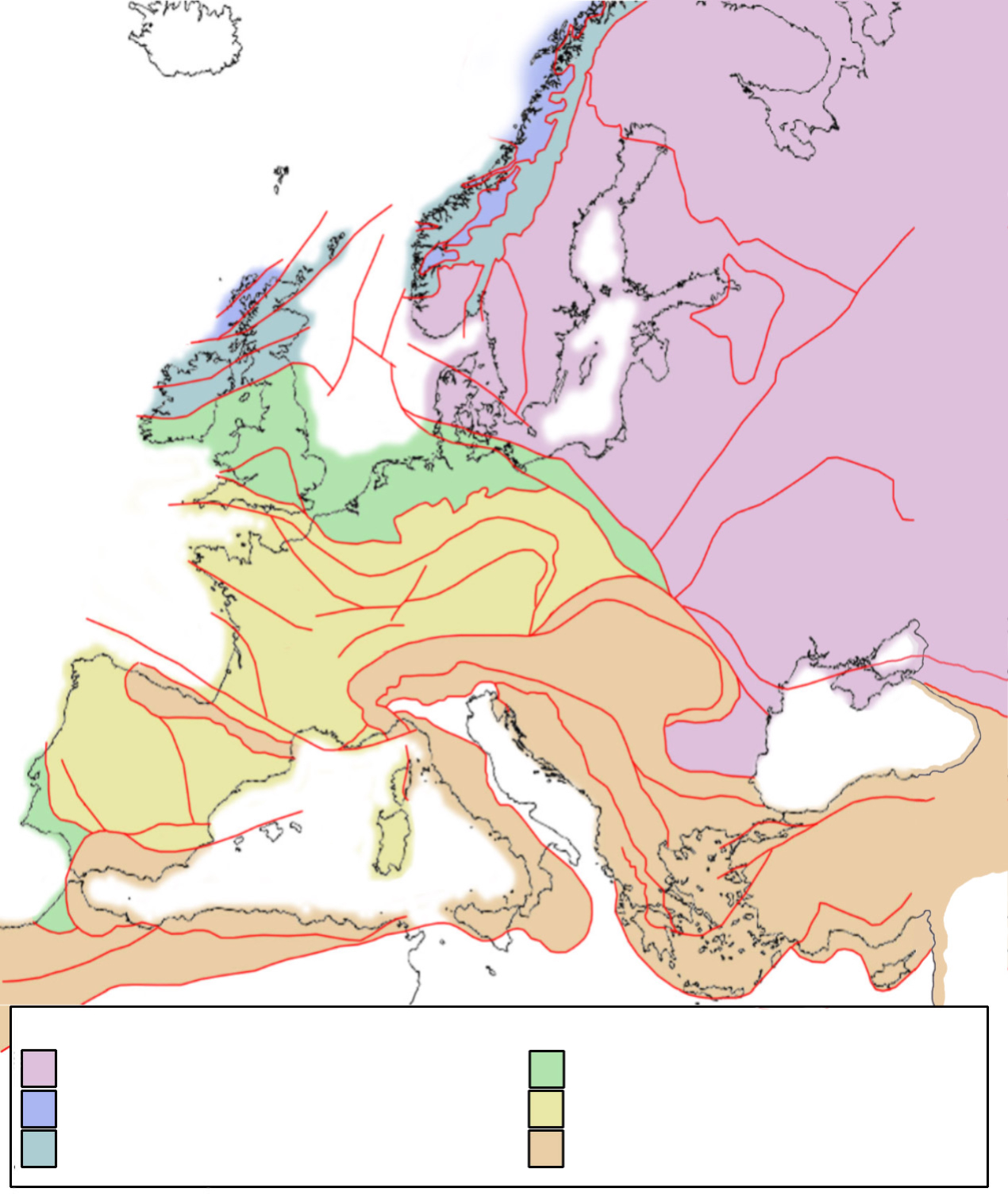
Tectonic map of Europe

The Carlsberg Fault zone is a concealed tectonic formation that runs across Copenhagen city centre, a side branch of the Trans-European Suture Zone. It is one of the most significant faults in the Copenhagen area being 400 to 700 meters wide and can be followed for about 30 km. It runs just east of the Frederiksberg Gardens in Copenhagen. The Frederiksberg Municipality collects about half of its water from the fault zone.

The Carlsberg Fault is located in a NNW-SSE striking fault system in the border zone between the Danish Basin and the Baltic Shield. Recent earthquakes indicate that this area is tectonically active.

It was described for the first time in 1925 at the Carlsberg Breweries.

== See also ==
- 2008 Skåne County earthquake
