= 2011 Aceh Singkil Regency earthquakes =

Earthquakes in Indonesia

2011 Aceh Singkil earthquake
- Location within Sumatra Location within Indonesia
- UTC time: 2011-09-05 17:55:12
- ISC event: 603334757
- USGS-ANSS: ComCat
- Local date: September 6, 2011
- Local time: 00:55:11 (UTC+7)
- Magnitude: 6.7 M_{w}^{(USGS)}
- Depth: 91.0 km (56.5 mi)
- Epicenter: 2.965°N 97.893°E
- Areas affected: Indonesia, Malaysia
- Max. intensity: MMI VI (Strong)
- Casualties: 10 dead

2011 Aceh Singkil earthquake that occurred 59 kilometers northeast of Singkil, Singkil, Aceh with a magnitude of 6.7 at 00:55 am on September 6, 2011 (17:55 UTC 5 September 2011). According to BMKG, this earthquake was at a depth of 78 km. However, according to the USGS, the quake was located at a depth of 91 km.

The earthquake was also felt to Selangor, Kuala Lumpur, Perak, Kedah and Penang in Malaysia. The intensity was MM III in George Town, Penang and MM II in Kuala Lumpur.

== Geology ==
This earthquake was in Semangko Section and was felt up to Banda Aceh, Binjai, Kabanjahe, Pakpak Bharat and Stabat.

== Impact ==
The earthquake caused damage from mild to severe to school buildings, government offices, places of worship, and homes in various regions. This earthquake left ten people dead.

== Statistics ==
Until the second day after the earthquake, the data obtained from the Post Disaster Porch Subulussalam record the number of damaged houses reached 2281 units (133 were severely damaged). 74 damaged schools, with details of 48 heavily damaged, 26 lightly damaged. In addition, 31 houses of worship or Musalla heavily damaged, 49 lightly damaged, and seven damaged.

A total of eight government offices were slightly damaged and three were severely damaged. Five health centers were slightly damaged, one heavily damaged, and one damaged. The home office as many as 16 units each of nine minor damage, 5 moderate damage, and 2 heavily damaged.

== Response ==
Head of Public Relations at the Bureau Secretariat Hukmas Aceh, Usamah Elmadny to Serambi reported, the panic of Government aid to earthquake victims in Aceh Singkil and Subulussalam has arrived at the scene on Wednesday (7 / 9) morning.

According to Usama quoting Social Kadis Aceh, Nasir Gurumud, the first phase of assistance to be dispatched on Tuesday night in the form of 10 000 eggs, 500 boxes of instant noodles, 1,200 cans of sardines, 300 liters of cooking oil, 1,000 pieces of shirt collar, robe 1,000 sheets, 200 package of family kits, 100 sheets of blue tarpaulin, 100 pieces of mattresses, 200 packets foodware, and 600 kilograms of salted fish has arrived in Subulussalam and have been distributed to victims, both in Subulussalam and Singkil.

On Wednesday afternoon yesterday, the team Dinsos Aceh with BPBA also moved into the disaster zone to make sure everything is insurmountable well. In that group, he participated two representatives of the Director General of Disaster Affairs of RI that will do the monitoring.

"The governor of Aceh, had been due to leave yesterday to lead the party well, but respect the existence of an important visit from the Military Attache of Singapore, as well as meetings with the Director General of Regional Autonomy Kemendagri, so he was forced to delay his departure and delegate tasks and responsibilities related to SKPA," said Osama. "The governor will continue to Singkil in 1–2 days," said Usamah.

== See also ==
- List of earthquakes in 2011
- List of earthquakes in Indonesia
