= 2011 Dalbandin earthquake =

Earthquake in Pakistan

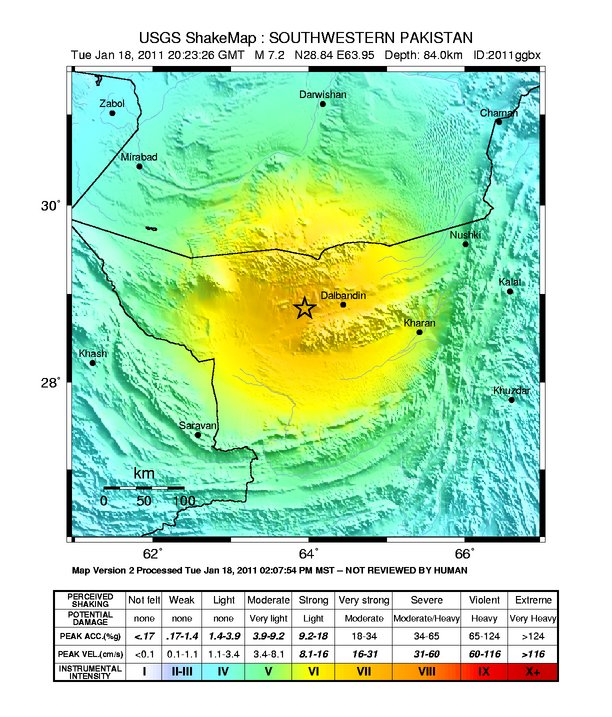

- Location within Pakistan
- UTC time: 2011-01-18 20:23:23
- ISC event: 15938045
- USGS-ANSS: ComCat
- Local date: 19 January 2011
- Local time: 01:23:23 PKT
- Magnitude: 7.2 M_{w}
- Depth: 90 km (55.9 mi)
- Epicenter: 28.75°N 64.05°E
- Type: Dip-slip
- Areas affected: Pakistan
- Total damage: Moderate
- Max. intensity: MMI VII (Very strong)
- Casualties: 3 killed, some injured

The 2011 Dalbandin earthquake occurred on 19 January at 01:23 a.m. local time with a moment magnitude of M_{w} 7.2 and a maximum Mercalli intensity of VII (Very strong). The shock occurred in a sparsely populated area of Pakistan's Balochistan province, causing moderate damage, three deaths, and some injuries.

== Earthquake ==
The tectonic environment of this region is dominated by the motions of the Arabian plate, the Indian plate, and the Eurasian plate. This earthquake occurred as a result of normal faulting within the lithosphere of the subducted Arabian plate.

== Damage ==
About 200 mud houses, including some government offices were reported damaged in the Dalbandin area of Pakistan. Two women died of heart attacks in Quetta after the earthquake, about 330 km northeast of the epicenter, where the Mercalli intensity was IV (Light).

== Intensity ==
Tremors after the earthquake reached neighboring countries including Bahrain, UAE, Oman, Iran, Afghanistan, and India. It was felt with a Mercali intensity of IV (Light) in Islamabad, Karachi, Muscat, Delhi, and III (Weak) in Kabul, Dubai, and Abu Dhabi.

== See also ==
- Chaman Fault
- List of earthquakes in 2011
- List of earthquakes in Pakistan
