= 2011 Kütahya earthquake =

Earthquake in Turkey

- UTC time: 2011-05-19 20:15:24
- ISC event: 602607377
- USGS-ANSS: ComCat
- Local date: May 19, 2011
- Local time: 23:15:24 UTC+03:00
- Magnitude: 5.8 M_{w}^{(ComCat)}
- Depth: 9.1 km (6 mi)
- Epicenter: 39.137°N 29.074°E
- Areas affected: Turkey
- Total damage: Building collapse, shattered windows
- Max. intensity: MMI VII (Very strong)
- Aftershocks: 450+ (max 4.6 M_{L})
- Casualties: 2 dead, 122 injured

The 2011 Kütahya earthquake struck near a populous region of western Turkey at 23:15 EEST (20:15 UTC) on 19 May with a moment magnitude of 5.8 and a maximum Mercalli intensity of VII (Very strong). With an epicenter just to the east of Simav, it occurred at an estimated depth of 9.1 kilometers (5.7 mi), resulting in strong shaking in much of Kütahya.

Many locals panicked and power was lost to most of Simav. A hospital in Simav reported an unknown number of injuries, and some buildings sustained damage. An elderly woman in İnegöl suffered a heart attack in the immediate aftermath of the tremor, and was later confirmed dead. In Simav, one person was killed after being struck by a concrete block. More than 450 weak aftershocks followed; the strongest registered at a magnitude of 4.6.

== Earthquake ==
The magnitude 5.8 (M_{w}) earthquake occurred inland on 19 May 2011 at 20:15 UTC at a depth of 9.1 km (5.7 mi), as a result of shallow intraplate faulting in an area of north–south tectonic extension about 80 km (50 mi) west-southwest of Kütahya city. High levels of seismic activity have been registered in the region; historically, it has been home to many destructive earthquakes. Preliminary analysis suggested the quake was triggered by a slip on an east–west trending normal fault. National seismologists identified the fault as the active Simav fault, which has previously generated earthquakes of similar intensities. Due to its magnitude, the quake was believed to have caused a surface rupture near the epicenter. Initial estimates from the United States Geological Survey placed the magnitude at 6.0 (M_{w}), though this – as well as its focal depth – was revised shortly after. Concurrently, the quake was assigned a preliminary magnitude of 5.9 (M_{L}) by the Kandilli Observatory and Earthquake Research Institute.

=== Intensity ===
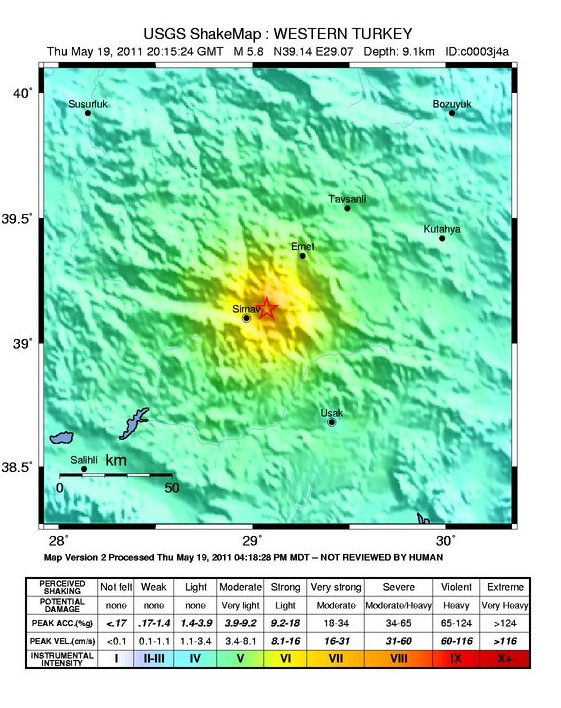
USGS ShakeMap for the event

Owing to the shallow depth, powerful shaking was reported in many areas around the epicenter. Maximum ground motion in Simav was estimated at VII (Very strong) on the Mercalli scale; Intensity VI (Strong) was also reported in the two proximate small districts of Pazarlar and Şaphane. Most of Kütahya Province, as well as some parts of adjacent provinces, reported lighter shaking (MM IV–V), with weak tremors felt as far away as Istanbul several hundred kilometers from the epicenter.

=== Related shocks ===
A light magnitude 3.8 M_{L} foreshock struck Simav at 19:59 UTC, 23 minutes before the main shock. As of 20 May 2011, over 450 minor aftershocks were reported in the region. Cumulatively, a total of 8 measured magnitude 4.0 (M_{L}) or greater; the strongest occurred near the epicenter at a magnitude of 4.6 (M_{L}) about 10 minutes after the main shock. There were no immediate reports of additional damage following the tremors.

=== Damage and casualties ===
The earthquake struck at midnight near a well-populated area; a good amount of structures around the epicenter were reported to be vulnerable to earthquake shaking. Residents in over 10 provinces exited their homes and rushed into vehicles, with some people reportedly jumping from windows and balconies in panic. Power supply was cut to most of Simav in order to prevent fires, and telephone lines in the area were down. Hundreds of structures in Samiv sustained damage, particularly ranging from deep cracks to roof collapse. Several small fires were sparked by damaged stoves in collapsed apartments, and the tremor toppled furniture in most residences.

A total of 122 people were injured; at least one person was reported to be in critical condition, and others suffered heart attacks and anxiety attacks. A man was killed after being struck in the head by a concrete block, while officials said an elderly woman in İnegöl died from cardiac. Other sources reported a third unidentified jump victim, though the validity of this claim remains uncertain.

== See also ==
- List of earthquakes in 2011
- List of earthquakes in Turkey
- 2011 Van earthquakes
