= 2008 Sulawesi earthquake =

Earthquake in Indonesia

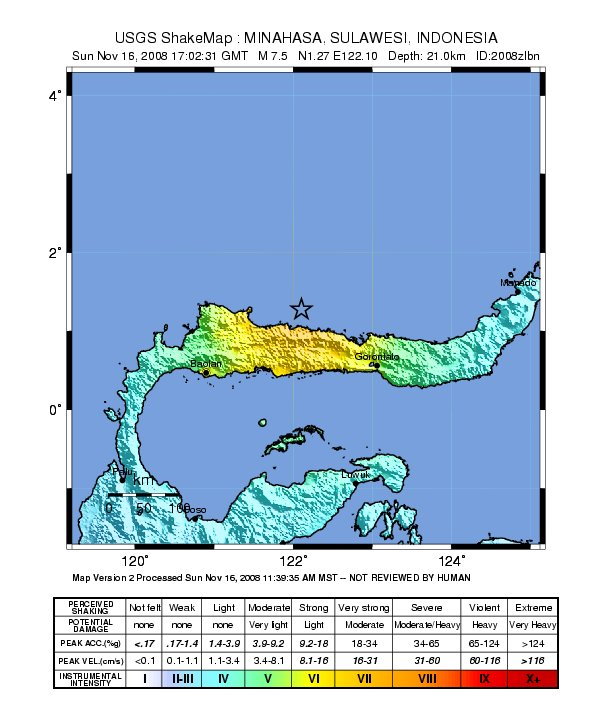

- Location within Sulawesi Location within Indonesia
- UTC time: 2008-11-16 17:02:32
- ISC event: 11453303
- USGS-ANSS: ComCat
- Local date: November 17, 2008
- Local time: 01:02
- Magnitude: 7.4 M_{w}
- Depth: 21 km (13 mi)
- Epicenter: 1.29°N 122.07°E
- Areas affected: Indonesia
- Max. intensity: MMI VII (Very strong)
- Casualties: 4 killed, 59 injured

The 2008 Sulawesi earthquake struck Sulawesi, Indonesia, on 16 November at 17:02:31 UTC. A 7.4 M_{w} earthquake, it was followed by seven aftershocks higher than 5.0 M_{w}. Tsunami warnings were issued for the region, but later cancelled. Four people were killed in the quake and 59 injured.

== Effects ==
The earthquake caused four fatalities and nearly 60 injuries. Over 700 houses were destroyed, and several buildings collapsed, one of which killed a man in the city of Gorontalo. The assessment of damage in rural areas with unreliable communication led officials to believe that the extent of the damage was greater than their initial evaluations.

== See also ==
- List of earthquakes in 2008
- List of earthquakes in Indonesia
