= 2008 Chechnya earthquake =

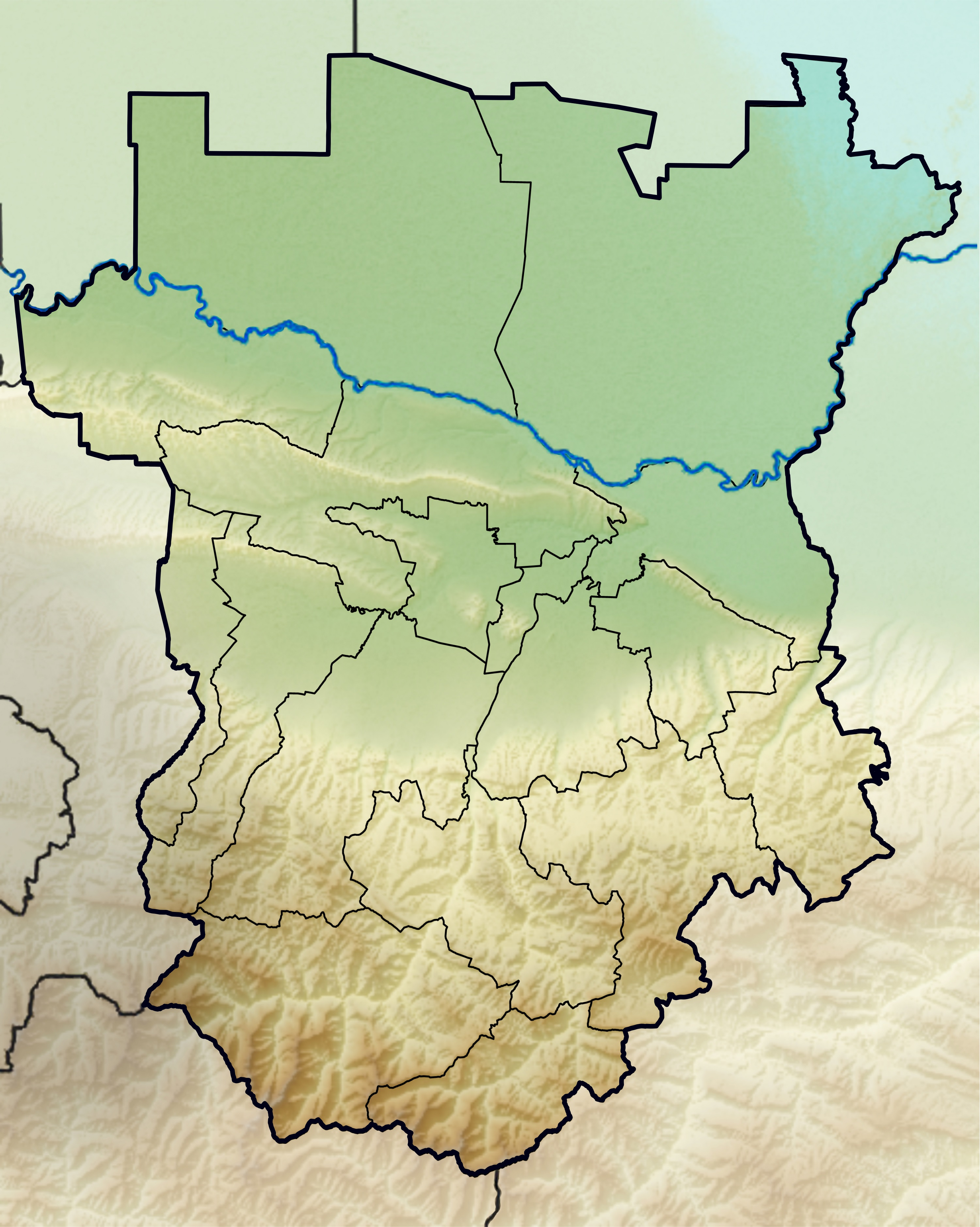
- Location within Chechnya Location within Russia
- UTC time: 2008-10-11 09:06:10
- ISC event: 13396641
- USGS-ANSS: ComCat
- Local date: October 11, 2008
- Local time: 13:06:10
- Magnitude: 5.8 M_{wc}
- Depth: 20.0 km (12.4 mi)
- Epicenter: 43.288°N 46.298°E
- Type: Dip-slip
- Areas affected: Russia; Chechnya; Dagestan; South Ossetia
- Max. intensity: MMI VII (Very strong)
- Casualties: 13 dead, 116 injured

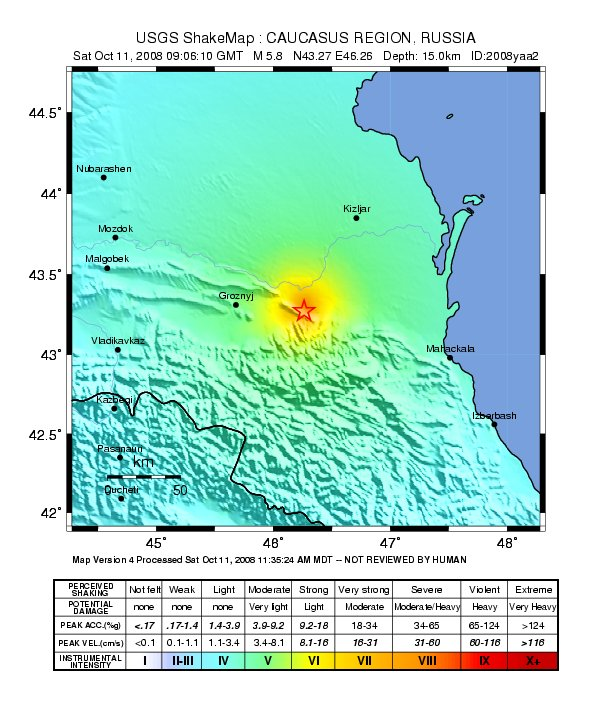
ShakeMap for the event

The 2008 Chechnya earthquake occurred October 11 at 09:06:10 UTC in Chechnya, Russia, with a M_{wc} magnitude of 5.8. At least 13 people from the districts of Gudermes, Shalinsky and Kurchaloyevsky were killed. The mainshock and a series of aftershocks were felt throughout the North Caucasus, and even in Armenia and Georgia. About 116 people were injured.

Dagestan, Ingushetia, North Ossetia and Stavropol also experienced the tremors, with a total of 16 shocks between 3 and 6 on the Richter scale. Some tremors lasted up to 30 seconds, causing serious structural damage in two Chechen districts, and left 52,000 people without power in three districts. Communications and roads in Chechnya were also disrupted.

Five-hundred families in the heavily affected town of Kurchaloy needed tent shelters, and the local hospital in that town was evacuated. There was only minimal damage in the Chechnya capital of Grozny, consisting mostly of broken windows.

Ramzan Kadyrov, the President of Chechnya said, "We have received information on damage from various districts... each and every [victim] will receive the necessary help and support."

A magnitude 5.3 aftershock struck the region approximately 16 minutes after the initial quake.

== See also ==
- List of earthquakes in 2008
- List of earthquakes in Russia
