= 2011 Yunnan earthquake =

5.4 Mw earthquake in Yunnan, China

- Location within Yunnan Location within China
- UTC time: 2011-03-10 04:58:13
- ISC event: 16298683
- USGS-ANSS: ComCat
- Local date: 10 March 2011
- Local time: 12:58 CST
- Magnitude: 5.4 M_{w}
- Depth: 10 kilometers (6.2 mi)
- Epicenter: 24.710°N 97.994°E; Yingjiang County, Yunnan, China
- Type: Strike-slip
- Areas affected: China; Burma
- Max. intensity: MMI VII (Very strong)
- Casualties: 26 deaths 313 injured (133 seriously injured)

The 2011 Yunnan earthquake was a 5.4 magnitude earthquake that occurred on 10 March 2011 at 12:58 CST, with its epicenter in Yingjiang County, Yunnan, People's Republic of China, near the Burmese border. A total of 26 people died and 313 were injured with 133 in serious condition. China's Xinhua reports that up to seven aftershocks, measuring up to a magnitude of 4.7, followed the initial quake, which caused a total of 127,000 people to be evacuated to nearby shelters. It joined over 1,000 other minor tremors that affected the region in the two preceding months. Following damage surveys, officials reported that 1,039 buildings were destroyed and 4,994 more were seriously damaged. The earthquake occurred one day before a much larger earthquake struck Japan that triggered a tsunami.

== Damage and casualties ==
The epicenter was 2 kilometers (1.2 mi) from the center of the county, which has a population of more than 270,000 people and is home to several of China's ethnic minorities. The state news agency reports that an estimate of 1,200 houses and apartments collapsed and that around 17,500 were severely damaged. The surrounding area also suffered through power outages caused by the quake and several aftershocks. It is not known if there were any casualties or damage in Burma. Although there was a power outage telecommunications continued to work after the earthquake. Close to 127,100 people were evacuated from Yingjiang County following the quake, which affected a total of 344,600 people.

China Central Television showed damaged buildings with debris around as police officers directed traffic on a chaotic street. A local reported the extent of the damage to the BBC, saying, "[half] of a supermarket building had collapsed. Three other big buildings nearby were also badly destroyed", and that "the walls of almost all the houses had collapsed."

Small tremors had been occurring in this region for two months and caused damage to many local buildings. A seismologist explained that the strength of this earthquake was enough to let damaged buildings collapse.

== Reaction ==
The Chinese media reported that 5,000 tents, 10,000 quilts and nearly 1,000 troops were being sent to the area to aid the rescue efforts. The Macao Red Cross also offered 200,000 RMB as a relief fund for the earthquake. Xinhua has described the area as a "Quake Prone belt" as there have been a thousand tremors in the area in recent months. There were multiple aftershocks as rescue efforts got underway by firefighters and other rescuers. The Chinese government allocated 55 million yuan to relief efforts on 11 March while the Ministry of Finance gave 50 million yuan for infrastructure repair. The earthquake forced the delay of a planned 180,000-kW hydroelectricity project in the Nujiang River Valley.

== See also ==
- List of earthquakes in 2011
- List of earthquakes in China
