= Nura, Kyrgyzstan =

Nura Kyrgyz: Нура
- Location within Kyrgyzstan
- Coordinates: 39°37′48″N 73°51′36″E
- Country: Kyrgyzstan
- Region: Osh
- District: Alay
- Elevation: 3,362 m (11,030 ft)

Population (2021)
  - Total: 1,101
- Time zone: UTC+6

Nura (Kyrgyz: Нура, romanized: Nura) is a village in Alay District, Osh Region of Kyrgyzstan, at the point where the A371 road from China turns northwest to go over the pass into the Alay Valley. Its population was 1,101 in 2021. It is at the mouth of a valley that goes south into some glaciated mountains on the Chinese border.

The town and border crossing of Irkeshtam is 7 km (4 mi) to the northeast.

An earthquake on October 6, 2008, hit the village, resulting in at least 75 deaths and leveling about 100 buildings. Along with Nura, which was destroyed in the quake, Qura, located near the epicenter, was also leveled.
