= 2011 Zumpango earthquake =

Earthquake in Mexico

- Location within Mexico
- UTC time: 2011-12-11 01:47:25
- ISC event: 603394181
- USGS-ANSS: ComCat
- Local date: 10 December 2011
- Local time: 19:47
- Magnitude: 6.5 M_{w}
- Depth: 64.9 km (40.3 mi)
- Epicenter: 17.99°N 99.79°E
- Type: Dip-slip (normal)
- Areas affected: Mexico
- Max. intensity: MMI VII (Very strong)
- Casualties: 3 dead, 10 injured

The 2011 Zumpango earthquake occurred at 19:47 local time on 10 December with a moment magnitude of 6.5 and a maximum Mercalli intensity of VII (Very strong). Its epicenter was located in the city Zumpango, Guerrero, roughly equidistant between the metropolitan areas of Mexico City and Acapulco. The quake was felt in Guerrero, Michoacán, Mexico State, Mexico City and Puebla.

Multiple deaths and injuries resulted from the earthquake, although the effects were minimized because the hypocenter was relatively deep at 65 kilometers (40 mi). The resulting damage was minimal, but during the panic people evacuated buildings in Mexico City.

== Impact ==
In Mexico City, a little more than 100 miles (160 km) from the epicenter, high rise buildings swayed for more than one minute as a result of the seism. Damage was reported as light though a secondary toll highway between Acapulco and Mexico City was blocked in several places due to landslides. The shaking was also responsible for knocking out power to around 82,000 people, and disrupting cell phone service in the capital. In Acapulco, 87 miles (140 km) from the epicenter, no injuries or damage were reported. It was reported by Mexico City's mayor, Marcelo Ebrard, that normal operations were continuing at Mexico City International Airport.

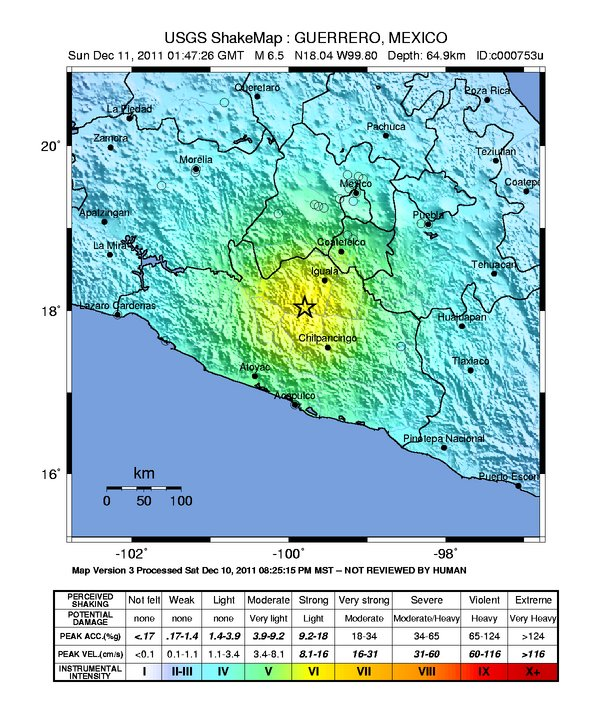
USGS shakemap for the event

== Casualties ==
Several injuries and one death was reported after rocks were dislodged from a hill and tumbled onto the Autopista del Sol (Highway of the Sun) and into a truck. The other deaths were reported as one person killed during the collapse of a house's roof in Iguala, and another was listed in Ixcateopan de Cuauhtémoc with unknown circumstances.

== Aftermath ==
An early report from the United States Geological Survey had the magnitude at 6.7 but it was later lowered to 6.5. According to the Secretariat of the Interior there were four aftershocks within the first 45 minutes of the main shock. Also stated was that since this was a moderate event a large number of aftershocks were not expected. Seven of the aftershocks were close to the epicenter and two more were in the state of Chiapas.

Although the event occurred in the coastal state of Guerrero, no tsunami warning was given for the earthquake. The National Oceanic and Atmospheric Administration stated that based on the location, magnitude, and historical tsunami records, no advisory or warning would be necessary for the west coast of the United States, British Columbia, or Alaska.

== See also ==
- Geography of Mexico
- List of earthquakes in 2011
- List of earthquakes in Mexico
