= 2011 Colorado earthquake =

- Location within Colorado
- UTC time: 2011-08-23 05:46:18
- USGS-ANSS: ComCat
- Local date: August 22, 2011
- Local time: 23:46:18 MDT
- Magnitude: 5.3 M_{w}
- Depth: 2.6 mi (4.2 km)
- Epicenter: 37.07°N 104.7°W
- Type: Dip-slip
- Areas affected: Colorado; United States
- Max. intensity: MMI VII (Very strong)

The 2011 Colorado earthquake occurred on August 22 at 11:46 PM MDT with a moment magnitude of 5.3 and a maximum Mercalli intensity of VII (Very Strong). The epicenter of the intraplate earthquake was 10 mi (20 km) west northwest of Trinidad, Colorado, and 180 mi (290 km) south of Denver, according to the United States Geological Survey (USGS). It was the largest natural earthquake to affect Colorado for more than a hundred years.

The earthquake occurred as part of a swarm of smaller quakes that started the previous day. The last time the Colorado region received a series of earthquakes was in 2001, when about a dozen smaller-sized temblors were recorded. The shock occurred as a result of normal faulting and was similar in depth, style and location to the events that made up the 2001 swarm.

== See also ==
- List of earthquakes in 2011
- List of earthquakes in the United States
- 2011 Virginia earthquake – Second M 5.0+ earthquake to hit the United States in less than a day, occurring almost 12 hours later.
