= 2008 Kyrgyzstan earthquake =

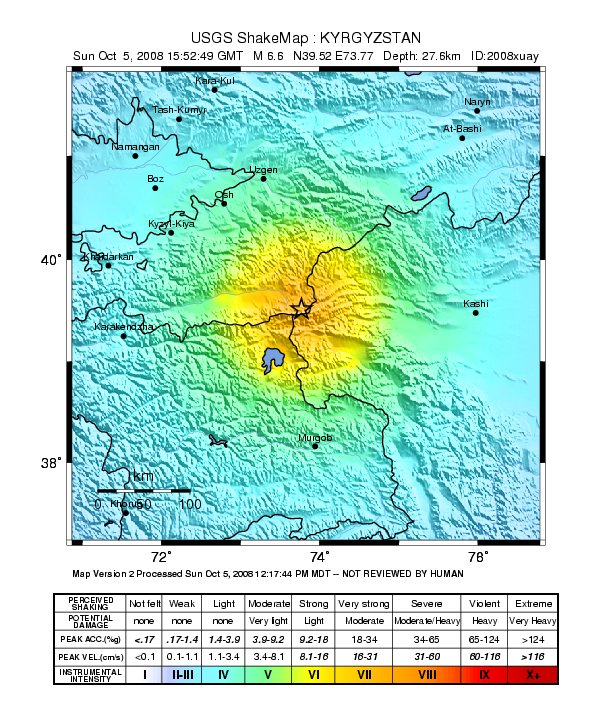
- UTC time: 2008-10-05 15:52:49
- ISC event: 13396075
- USGS-ANSS: ComCat
- Local date: October 5, 2008
- Local time: 21:52:49 KGT
- Magnitude: 6.6 M_{w}
- Depth: 27.6 kilometres (17 mi)
- Epicenter: 39°50′54″N 73°46′4.8″E
- Areas affected: Kyrgyzstan, Tajikistan, China
- Max. intensity: MMI VII (Very strong)
- Casualties: 75 dead, 150 injured

The 2008 Kyrgyzstan earthquake struck on October 5 at 21:52 local time (15:52 UTC) with a moment magnitude of 6.6, killing 75 people, including 41 children, and injuring 150 people, including 93 children. The center of the earthquake was near the town of Nura, which was destroyed in the quake. The shock destroyed dozens of buildings in the area and destroyed the nearby village of Kura. Minor damage also occurred in nearby Xinjiang Uyghur Autonomous Region. The quake was felt throughout Central Asia. A magnitude 5.7 aftershock in Xinjiang and a magnitude 5.1 aftershock in Kyrgyzstan followed the earthquake. Two more aftershocks above magnitude 5 in Kyrgyzstan and one in Xinjiang struck on October 13, UTC time. Victims were transported in military helicopters to hospitals in Osh.

The Kyrgyzstan Emergency Ministry said that few buildings remained standing in the village: "Almost all buildings in the village have been destroyed. The only buildings remaining are the properly engineered ones which were built recently: the school and a medical clinic." Kanatbek Abdrakhmatov, head of the Institute of Seismology, attributed much of the destruction due to inferior construction of the buildings, many of which were built out of clay and straw.

The injured were paid 5,000 Kyrgyzstani soms (US$ 136) and three tons of coal, and families of the dead received 50 kg of flour. Two hundred people who chose to remain in Nura were provided with 100 six-person tents. One hundred mobile homes were transported to Nura, and the village was to be rebuilt in the spring of 2009 with a completion date set for August 2009. Uzbekistan pledged the equivalent of US$200,000 in humanitarian aid, including 120 tons of cement, as well as other building materials.

In Kyrgyzstan, an official day of mourning was observed on October 7, 2008.

== See also ==
- List of earthquakes in 2008
- List of earthquakes in Kyrgyzstan
- 2011 Fergana Valley earthquake
