= 2011 Fergana Valley earthquake =

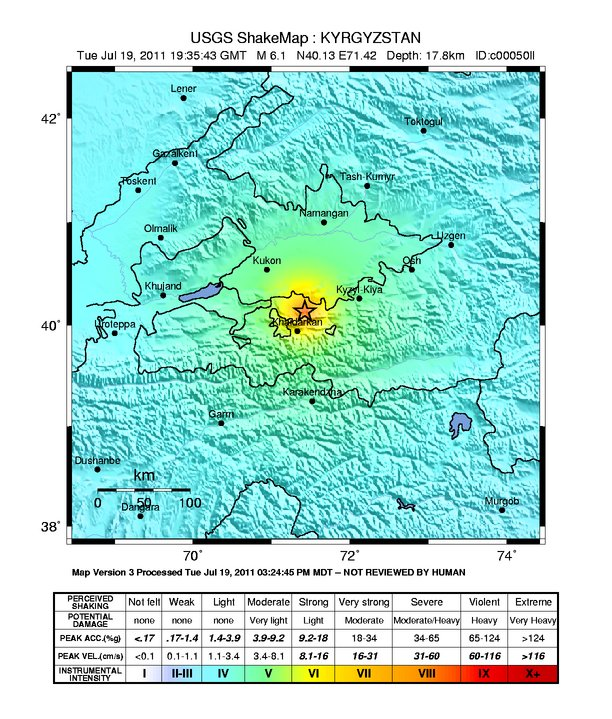
- USGS ShakeMap

- Location within Kyrgyzstan Location within Uzbekistan Location within Tajikistan
- UTC time: 2011-07-19 19:35:43
- ISC event: 16868779
- USGS-ANSS: ComCat
- Local date: July 20, 2011
- Local time: 01:35
- Magnitude: 6.1 M_{w}
- Depth: 20.0 km (12.4 mi)
- Epicenter: 40.081°N 71.410°E
- Type: Reverse
- Areas affected: Uzbekistan; Kyrgyzstan; Tajikistan
- Total damage: Limited
- Max. intensity: MMI VIII (Severe)
- Casualties: 14 dead, 86 injured

The 2011 Fergana Valley earthquake affected Uzbekistan, Kyrgyzstan and Tajikistan at 01:35 KGT (19:35 UTC) on 20 July. The dip-slip shock had a moment magnitude of 6.1 and a maximum Mercalli intensity of VIII (Severe). Its epicenter was located just inside Kyrgyzstan's border in the Fergana Valley region. Fourteen people were killed and eighty-six were injured in the earthquake.

Casualties by country
Country	Deaths	Injuries
Uzbekistan	13	86
Tajikistan	1	0
Total	14	86

== Impact ==
In Khujand, Tajikistan, one man was killed after panicking during the tremor and jumping out of a window. Fourteen people in Uzbekistan were killed, while another 86 sustained injuries, of which 35 were hospitalized. Many houses in Fergana Region were damaged, with cracked walls. Numerous small houses in Margilan were destroyed. Many residents panicked and ran into the streets. A rockfall closed a highway between Batken and Osh. Apartment blocks in the city of Fergana were evacuated. At least 800 houses were damaged. Power was briefly knocked out in Kadamzhai, Tulgone, Kyzyl-Bulun, Halmion, Ohne, Yargutane, and Tamas. A hospital in Hamza, Uzbekistan was severely damaged.

== See also ==
- List of earthquakes in 2011
- List of earthquakes in Kyrgyzstan
- 2008 Kyrgyzstan earthquake
