= List of earthquakes in 2008 =

Earthquakes in 2008
Approximate epicenters of the earthquakes in 2008
- 4.0–5.9 magnitude
- 6.0–6.9 magnitude
- 7.0–7.9 magnitude
- 8.0+ magnitude
- Strongest: 7.9 M_{w}, China
- Deadliest: 7.9 M_{w}, China 87,587 deaths
- Total fatalities: 88,011

Number by magnitude
- 9.0+: 0
- 8.0–8.9: 1
- 7.0–7.9: 12
- 6.0–6.9: 168
- 5.0–5.9: 1768

Earthquakes in 2008 resulted in about 88,011 fatalities. The 2008 Sichuan earthquake was the deadliest with 87,587 fatalities, and also the largest at 7.9 on the moment magnitude scale. Other significant earthquakes struck Pakistan, Kyrgyzstan, the Democratic Republic of Congo, Russia, Japan, Colombia, and other parts of China.

== Compared to other years ==
Number of earthquakes worldwide for 1999–2009 []
Magnitude	1999	2000	2001	2002	2003	2004	2005	2006	2007	2008	2009
8.0–9.9	0	1	1	0	1	2	1	2	4	1	1
7.0–7.9	18	15	14	13	14	14	10	9	14	12	16
6.0–6.9	117	145	122	126	139	141	139	142	178	167	143
5.0–5.9	1,057	1,334	1,212	1,170	1,212	1,511	1,694	1,726	2,090	1,786	1,912
4.0–4.9	7,004	7,968	7,969	8,479	8,455	10,880	13,893	12,843	12,081	12,294	6,817
Total	8,296	9,462	9,319	9,788	9,823	12,551	15,738	14,723	14,367	14,261	8,891

== Overall ==
=== By death toll ===
Rank	Death toll	Magnitude	Location	MMI	Depth (km)	Date
1	87,587	7.9	China, Sichuan	XI (Extreme)	19.0	May 12
2	215	6.4	Pakistan, Balochistan	VIII (Severe)	10.0	October 29
3	75	6.6	Kyrgyzstan, Osh	VII (Very strong)	27.6	October 5
4	44	5.9	(Democratic Republic of the Congo) DR Congo, Lake Kivu	VIII (Severe)	10.0	February 3
5	41	6.1	China, Sichuan	VI (Strong)	10.0	August 30
6	23	6.9	Japan, Honshu	IX (Violent)	8.0	June 13
7	13	5.8	Russia, Dagestan	VII (Very strong)	20.0	October 11
8	11	5.9	Colombia, El Calvario	VII (Very strong)	35.0	May 24
9	10	6.4	China, Tibet	VII (Very strong)	10.0	October 6

- Note: At least 10 dead

=== By magnitude ===
Rank	Magnitude	Death toll	Location	MMI	Depth (km)	Date
1	7.9	87,587	China, Sichuan	XI (Extreme)	19.0	May 12
2	7.7	0	Russia, Sea of Okhotsk	III (Weak)	632.8	July 5
3	7.4	3	Indonesia, Simeulue	VIII (Severe)	25.0	February 20
3	7.4	6	Indonesia, Sulawesi	VII (Very strong)	21.0	November 16
5	7.3	0	Russia, Sea of Okhotsk	III (Weak)	632.0	May 12
5	7.3	0	New Caledonia, Loyalty Islands	VII (Very strong)	33.0	April 9
7	7.2	0	Indonesia, Sumatra	VI (Strong)	28.0	February 25
7	7.2	0	China, Xinjiang	VIII (Severe)	15.0	March 20
9	7.1	0	Australia, Macquarie Island	V (Moderate)	16.0	April 12
10	7.0	0	South Georgia and the South Sandwich Islands	VII (Very strong)	8.0	June 30
10	7.0	0	Japan, Honshu	VIII (Severe)	22.0	July 19
10	7.0	0	New Zealand, Kermadec Islands	V (Moderate)	36.0	September 29

- Note: At least 7.0 Magnitude

== By month ==
=== January ===
January
- Strongest: 6.6 M_{w} Canada
- Deadliest: 4.6 M_{w} Algeria; 1 death 6.2 M_{w} Indonesia; 1 death
- Total fatalities: 2

Number by magnitude
- 8.0–8.9: 0
- 7.0–7.9: 0
- 6.0–6.9: 14
- 5.0–5.9: 110

- A magnitude 6.3 earthquake struck Papua New Guinea on January 1.
- A magnitude 6.0 earthquake struck Sumatra, Indonesia on January 4.
- A magnitude 6.6 earthquake struck Haida Gwaii, Canada on January 5.
- A magnitude 6.4 earthquake struck Haida Gwaii, Canada on January 5.
- A magnitude 6.2 earthquake struck Greece on January 6.
- A magnitude 5.9 earthquake struck Papua, Indonesia on January 7. Six people were injured and 22 homes were damaged.
- A magnitude 6.4 earthquake struck Tibet, China on January 9.
- A magnitude 4.6 earthquake struck Northern Algeria on January 9. One person was killed and several homes were damaged.
- A magnitude 6.1 earthquake struck Haida Gwaii, Canada on January 9.
- A magnitude 6.3 earthquake struck off the coast of Oregon on January 10.
- A magnitude 6.5 earthquake struck Fiji on January 15.
- (Indonesia) A magnitude 6.1 earthquake struck the Molucca Sea on January 20.
- A magnitude 6.0 earthquake struck Tonga on January 22.
- A magnitude 6.1 earthquake struck Tonga on January 22.
- A magnitude 6.2 earthquake struck Sumatra, Indonesia on January 22. One person died, five others were injured and several homes were damaged in Gunungsitoli.
- (Indonesia) A magnitude 6.2 earthquake struck the Banda Sea on January 30.

=== February ===
February
- Strongest: 7.4 M_{w} Indonesia
- Deadliest: 5.9 M_{w} Democratic Republic of the Congo; 44 death
- Total fatalities: 49

Number by magnitude
- 7.0–7.9: 2
- 6.0–6.9: 18
- 5.0–5.9: 146

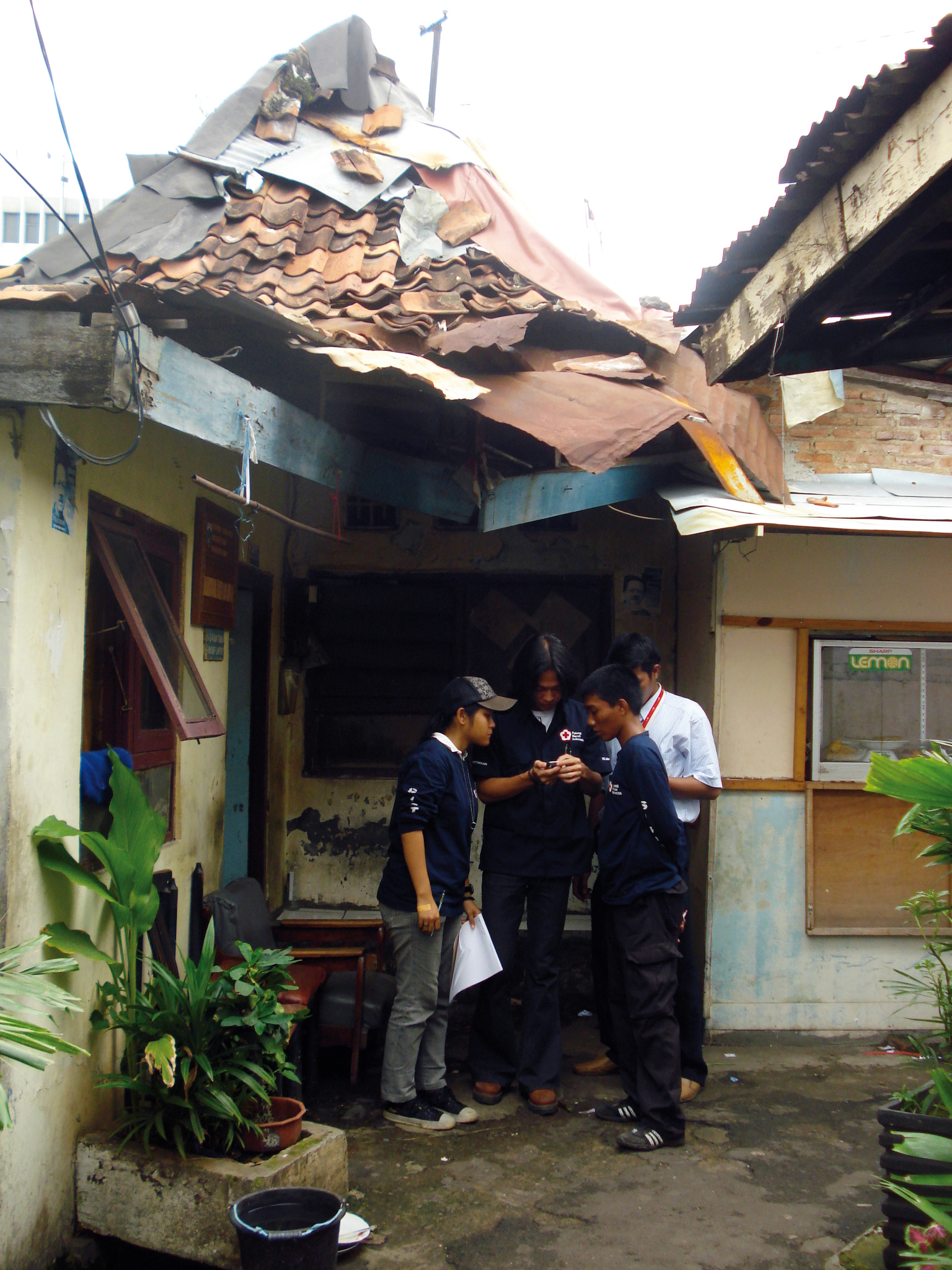
Assessing damage from the earthquake in Indonesia.

- A magnitude 5.9 earthquake struck Lake Kivu, Democratic Republic of the Congo on February 3, killing 44 people.
- A magnitude 6.3 earthquake struck Tarapaca, Chile on February 4.
- A magnitude 4.3 earthquake struck West Bengal, India on February 6, killing 1 person.
- A magnitude 6.9 earthquake occurred in the Northern Atlantic Ocean on February 8.
- (South Georgia and the South Sandwich Islands) A magnitude 6.6 earthquake struck the South Sandwich Islands on February 10.
- A magnitude 6.5 earthquake struck Oaxaca, Mexico on February 12.
- A magnitude 5.3 earthquake struck Rwanda on February 14, killing 1 person.
- A magnitude 6.9 earthquake struck Southern Greece on February 14.
- (Norway) A magnitude 6.2 earthquake struck Svalbard on February 21.
- A magnitude 6.0 earthquake struck Nevada on February 21.
- (United Kingdom) A magnitude 6.8 earthquake struck the South Shetland Islands on February 23.
- A magnitude 7.4 earthquake struck Sumatra, Indonesia on February 20, killing 3 people.
- A magnitude 7.2 earthquake struck Sumatra, Indonesia on February 25.
- (United Kingdom) A magnitude 5.2 earthquake struck Lincolnshire, Great Britain on February 27, injuring 1 person.

=== March ===
March
- Strongest: 7.2 M_{w} China
- Deadliest: -
- Total fatalities: 0

Number by magnitude
- 7.0–7.9: 1
- 6.0–6.9: 14
- 5.0–5.9: 147

- A magnitude 6.2 earthquake struck the Mentawai Islands Regency, Indonesia on March 3.
- (Russia) A magnitude 6.5 earthquake struck the Kuril Islands on March 3.
- A magnitude 6.0 earthquake struck offshore Luzon, Philippines on March 3.
- A magnitude 6.9 earthquake struck offshore Samar, Philippines on March 3.
- A magnitude 6.4 earthquake struck Vanuatu on March 12.
- A magnitude 6.3 earthquake struck Vanuatu on March 12.
- (South Africa) A magnitude 6.0 earthquake struck the Prince Edward Islands on March 13.
- (Japan) A magnitude 6.0 earthquake struck offshore the Ogasawara Islands on March 14.
- A magnitude 6.0 earthquake struck offshore Simeulue, Indonesia on March 15.
- (New Zealand) A magnitude 6.2 earthquake struck the Kermadec Islands on March 18.
- A magnitude 6.1 earthquakes struck offshore Mindanao, Philippines on March 20.
- A magnitude 7.2 earthquake struck Xinjiang, China on March 20.
- (Alaska) A magnitude 6.2 earthquake struck the Aleutian Islands on March 22.
- A magnitude 6.2 earthquake struck the Tarapacá Region, Chile on March 24.
- A magnitude 6.3 earthquake struck offshore Simeulue, Indonesia on March 29.

=== April ===
April
- Strongest: 7.3 M_{w} New Caledonia
- Deadliest: -
- Total fatalities: 0

Number by magnitude
- 7.0–7.9: 2
- 6.0–6.9: 19
- 5.0–5.9: 163

- A magnitude 6.4 earthquake struck New Caledonia on April 9.
- A magnitude 6.3 earthquake struck New Caledonia on April 9.
- A magnitude 7.3 earthquake struck New Caledonia on April 9.
- A magnitude 6.3 earthquake struck New Caledonia on April 9.
- A magnitude 6.1 earthquake struck New Caledonia on April 11.
- (Australia) A magnitude 7.1 earthquake struck Macquarie Island on April 12.
- (South Georgia and the South Sandwich Islands) A magnitude 6.0 earthquake struck the South Sandwich Islands on April 14.
- A magnitude 6.1 earthquake struck offshore Guatemala on April 15.
- (Alaska) A magnitude 6.4 earthquake struck the Aleutian Islands on April 15.
- (Alaska) A magnitude 6.6 earthquake struck the Aleutian Islands on April 16.
- (United States) A magnitude 5.4 earthquake struck Illinois on April 18.
- A magnitude 6.3 earthquake struck Fiji on April 18.
- A magnitude 6.1 earthquake struck Maluku, Indonesia on April 19.
- A magnitude 6.3 earthquake struck New Caledonia on April 19.
- A magnitude 6.0 earthquake struck Maluku, Indonesia on April 19.
- A magnitude 6.0 earthquake struck Taiwan on April 23.
- A magnitude 5.2 earthquake struck Brazil on April 23
- A magnitude 6.5 earthquake occurred in the south Atlantic Ocean on April 24.
- A swarm of earthquakes, the largest being a magnitude 4.7 on April 26, struck Nevada from April 15 to April 26.
- (New Zealand) A magnitude 6.1 earthquake struck Auckland Island on April 26.
- (South Georgia and the South Sandwich Islands) A magnitude 6.1 earthquake struck the South Sandwich Islands on April 28.
- A magnitude 6.4 earthquake struck New Caledonia on April 28.
- A magnitude 6.1 earthquake struck New Caledonia on April 28.

=== May ===
May
- Strongest: 7.9 M_{w} China
- Deadliest: 7.9 M_{w} China; 87,587 death
- Total fatalities: 87,606

Number by magnitude
- 7.0–7.9: 1
- 6.0–6.9: 12
- 5.0–5.9: 175

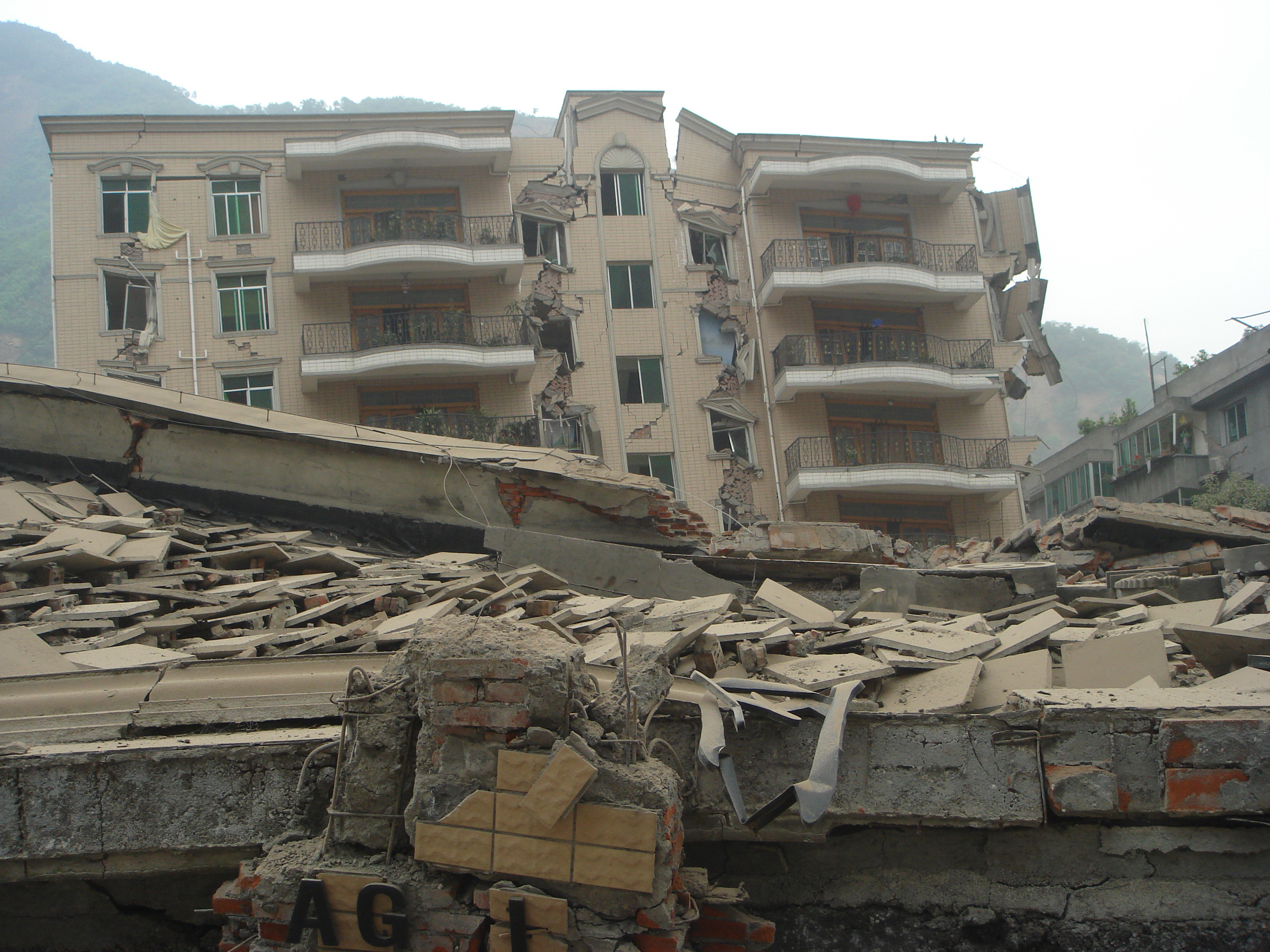
A building collapsed in Beichuan, China.

- (Alaska) A magnitude 6.6 earthquake struck the Aleutian Islands on May 2.
- A magnitude 6.8 earthquake struck Japan on May 7, injuring 6 people.
- A magnitude 6.7 earthquake struck Guam on May 9.
- A magnitude 7.9 earthquake struck Sichuan, China on May 12, killing 87,587 people and causing widespread damage.
- A magnitude 5.9 earthquake struck Colombia on May 24, killing 11 people.
- A magnitude 6.1 earthquake struck Sichuan, China on May 25, killing 8 people.
- A magnitude 6.1 earthquake struck Iceland on May 29, injuring 30 people.

=== June ===
June
- Strongest: 7.0 M_{w} South Georgia and the South Sandwich Islands
- Deadliest: 6.9 M_{w} Japan; 13 death
- Total fatalities: 23

Number by magnitude
- 7.0–7.9: 1
- 6.0–6.9: 15
- 5.0–5.9: 166

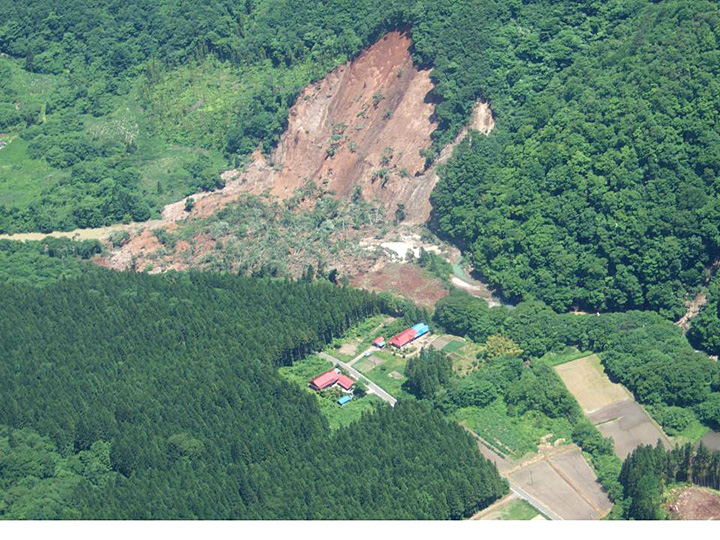
A landslide on the Sako River caused by the earthquake in Japan.

- A magnitude 5.5 earthquake struck Northern Algeria on June 6, killing one person.
- A magnitude 6.4 earthquake struck Greece on June 8, killing 2 people.
- A magnitude 6.9 earthquake struck Honshu, Japan on June 13, killing 13 people.
- A magnitude 4.8 earthquake struck Sichuan, China, killing 2 people.
- A magnitude 6.1 earthquake struck Tonga on June 26.
- (India) A magnitude 6.6 earthquake struck the Andaman Islands on June 27.
- (South Georgia and the South Sandwich Islands) A magnitude 7.0 earthquake struck the South Sandwich Islands on June 30.

=== July ===
July
- Strongest: 7.7 M_{w} Russia
- Deadliest: 6.2 M_{w} Peru; 1 death 6.4 M_{w} Greece; 1 death 6.8 M_{w} Japan; 1 death 5.7 M_{w} China; 1 death
- Total fatalities: 4

Number by magnitude
- 7.0–7.9: 2
- 6.0–6.9: 12
- 5.0–5.9: 124

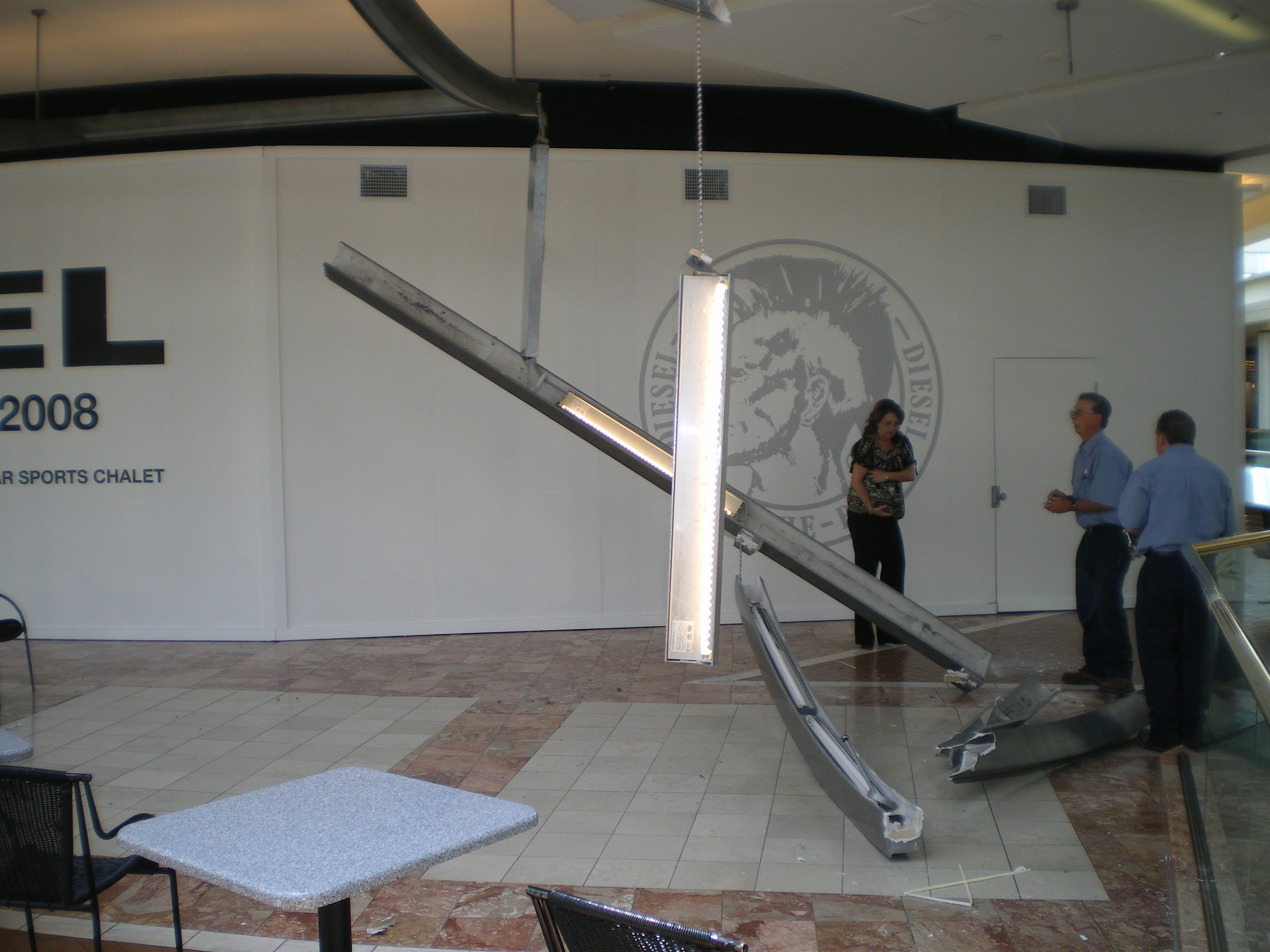
Damage in a shopping center in California, United States.

- (Russia) A magnitude 7.7 earthquake struck Kamchatka on July 5.
- A magnitude 6.2 earthquake struck Southern Peru on July 8, killing one person.
- A magnitude 6.4 earthquake struck Greece on July 15, killing one person.
- A magnitude 7.0 earthquake struck offshore Eastern Honshu, Japan on July 19.
- (Solomon Islands) A magnitude 6.6 earthquake struck the Santa Cruz Islands on July 19.
- A magnitude 6.8 earthquake struck Eastern Honshu, Japan on July 23, killing one person.
- A magnitude 5.7 earthquake struck Sichuan, China on July 24, killing one person.
- (United States) A magnitude 5.5 earthquake struck Southern California on July 29.

=== August ===
August
- Strongest: 6.7 M_{w} China
- Deadliest: 5.7 M_{w} China; 43 death
- Total fatalities: 54

Number by magnitude
- 6.0–6.9: 16
- 5.0–5.9: 153

- (Indonesia) A magnitude 6.3 earthquake struck the Banda Sea on August 4.
- A magnitude 6.0 earthquake struck Sichuan, China on August 5, killing 4 people.
- A magnitude 6.5 earthquake struck offshore Antarctica on August 9.
- A magnitude 6.3 earthquake struck offshore Antarctica on August 9.
- (India) A magnitude 6.2 earthquake struck the Andaman Islands on August 10.
- A magnitude 6.0 earthquake occurred in the South Atlantic Ocean on August 11.
- A magnitude 6.0 earthquake struck the Philippines on August 15.
- A magnitude 6.1 earthquake struck Samoa on August 19.
- A magnitude 6.0 earthquake struck Yingjiang, China on August 21, killing 5 people.
- A magnitude 6.0 earthquake struck offshore Rodrigues, Mauritius on August 22.
- A magnitude 6.7 earthquake struck Tibet, China on August 25.
- A magnitude 6.4 earthquake struck Peru on August 26.
- A magnitude 6.3 earthquake struck Irkutsk, Russia on August 27.
- A magnitude 6.3 earthquake occurred in the South Atlantic Ocean on August 28.
- A magnitude 6.4 earthquake struck Papua New Guinea on August 31.
- A magnitude 5.7 earthquake struck Sichuan, China on August 30, killing 43 people.
- A magnitude 5.5 earthquake struck Sichuan, China on August 31, killing 2 people.

=== September ===
September
- Strongest: 7.0 M_{w} New Zealand
- Deadliest: 6.1 M_{w} Iran; 1 death
- Total fatalities: 10

Number by magnitude
- 7.0–7.9: 1
- 6.0–6.9: 11
- 5.0–5.9: 138

- A magnitude 6.9 earthquake struck Vanuatu on September 8.
- A magnitude 5.2 earthquake struck Southern Sumatra, Indonesia on September 9.
- A magnitude 6.1 earthquake struck Iran on September 10, killing 7 people.
- A magnitude 6.6 earthquake struck Halmahera, Indonesia on September 11.
- A magnitude 6.8 earthquake struck Hokkaido, Japan on September 11.
- A magnitude 5.0 earthquake struck Maharashtra, India on September 16, killing 1 person.
- (New Zealand) A magnitude 7.0 earthquake struck the Kermadec Islands on September 29.

=== October ===
October
- Strongest: 6.7 M_{w} Kyrgyzstan
- Deadliest: 6.4 M_{w} Pakistan; 225 death

Number by magnitude
- 7.0–7.9: 0
- 6.0–6.9: 9
- 5.0–5.9: 198

- (Kyrgyzstan) Nura (6.6, October 5)
- (China) Damxung (6.4, October 6)
- (Russia) Chechnya (5.8, October 11)
- (Pakistan) Balochistan (6.4, October 29)

=== November ===
November

- (Indonesia) Sulawesi (7.3, November 16)

=== December ===
December

- (Sweden) Skåne County (4.3, December 16)
- (Chile) Papudo (6.8, December 18)
- (Italy) Parma (5.2, December 23)

== See also ==
- List of 21st-century earthquakes
