= 2008 Scania earthquake =

Earthquake in Sweden

2008 Skåne County earthquake
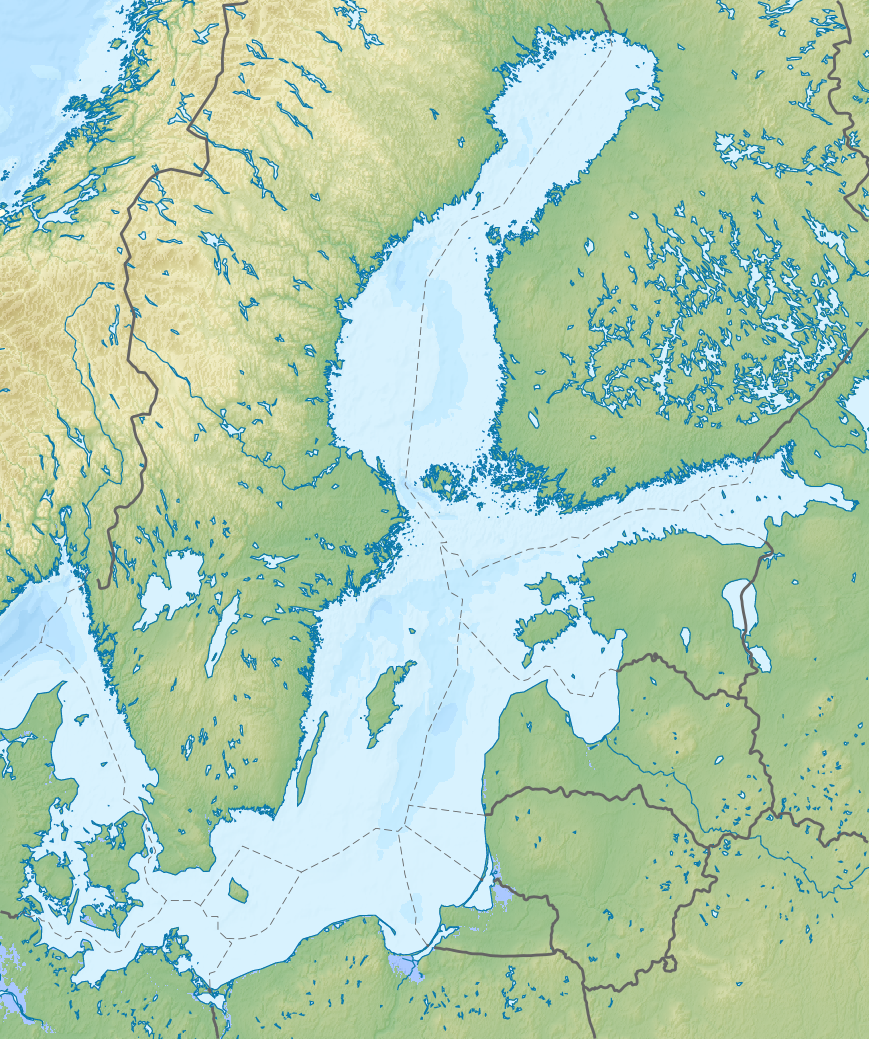
- Location within Baltic Sea
- UTC time: 2008-12-16 05:20:01
- ISC event: 13402913
- USGS-ANSS: ComCat
- Local date: 16 December 2008
- Local time: 06:20:01
- Magnitude: 4.3 M_{w}
- Depth: 24.8 km (15.4 mi)
- Epicenter: 55.56°N 13.6°E
- Areas affected: Götaland, Sweden; Zealand, Denmark
- Max. intensity: MMI V (Moderate)
- Casualties: none

The 2008 Scania earthquake occurred at 06.20am CET (05.20 UTC) on 16 December and affected the southern part of Sweden and eastern parts of Denmark. The epicenter was 5 km southwest of Sjöbo and 60 km east of Malmö in Scania. The earthquake was considered "moderately strong" with a moment magnitude calculated at 4.2–4.3 M_{w}. Strong shaking was reported widely in Sweden from Skåne to Östergötland, in Denmark, and in northern Poland. The Skåne region is known for extremely low seismic activity, with only three small earthquakes (each less than 2.8) detected between 1970 and 2008, and only 14 earthquakes since 1375. Roadways in Sweden and Denmark were reported with cracks but investigations did not determine if any were caused by the earthquake.

== See also ==
- List of earthquakes in 2008
- Geology of Sweden
