= List of earthquakes 2011–2020 =

Earthquakes in 2011–2020
- Strongest: (Japan) Japan; 9.1 M_{w}
- Deadliest: (Japan) Japan; 9.1 M_{w} 20,896
- Total fatalities: 43,077

Number by magnitude
- 9.0+: 1
- 8.0–8.9: 9
- 7.0–7.9: 135
- 6.0–6.9: 1,320
- 5.0–5.9: 81,848

The following is a list of significant earthquakes for the period 2011–2020, listing earthquakes of magnitude 7 and above, or which caused fatalities. Deaths due to earthquake-caused tsunamis are included.

For lists of earthquakes by country, which may include smaller and less destructive events than those listed here, see Lists of earthquakes by country.

== 2011 ==
Date	Time (UTC)	Place	Lat.	Long.	Fatalities	Magnitude	Comments	Source
January 1, 2011	09:56	Santiago del Estero, Argentina	-26.758	-63.103	0	7.0	M_{w} (USGS) Centred 160 km NE of Santiago del Estero, Argentina, at a depth of 576.8 km.	
January 2, 2011	20:20	Araucania, Chile see 2011 Temuco earthquake	-38.354	-73.275	0	7.1	M_{w} (USGS) Centred 70 km NW of Temuco, Araucania, Chile, at a depth of 25.1 km.	
January 13, 2011	16:16	Loyalty Islands, New Caledonia	-20.622	168.459	0	7.0	M_{w} (USGS) Centred 120 km NNE of Tadine, Loyalty Islands, New Caledonia, at a depth of 9 km.	
January 18, 2011	20:23	Balochistan, Pakistan see 2011 Dalbandin earthquake	28.732	63.928	3	7.2	M_{w} (USGS) Centred 50 km WSW of Dalbandin, Pakistan, at a depth of 68 km.	
February 4, 2011	13:53	Myanmar–India border region	24.618	94.680	1	6.2	M_{w} (USGS) Centred 62.5 km east of Wangjing, India, at a depth of 85.0 km. The fatality took place in Myanmar.	
February 21, 2011	23:51	South Island of New Zealand see 2011 Christchurch earthquake	-43.583	172.680	185	6.1	M_{w} (USGS) Centred 6 km SSE of Christchurch, New Zealand, at a depth of 5.9 km.	
March 9, 2011	02:45	Near the east coast of Honshu, Japan	38.440	142.840	0	7.3	M_{w} (USGS) Centred 168 km east of Sendai, Honshu, Japan, at a depth of 32 km.	
March 10, 2011	04:58	Myanmar–China border region see 2011 Yunnan earthquake	24.727	97.597	26	5.5	M_{w} (USGS) Centred 95 km SE of Myitkyina, Myanmar, at a depth of 10 km. Most damage took place in China.	
March 11, 2011	05:46	Near the east coast of Honshu, Japan see 2011 Tohoku earthquake and tsunami	38.297	142.372	18,184 dead 2,668 missing	9.1	M_{w} (USGS) Centred 129 km east of Sendai, Honshu, Japan, at a depth of 30 km.	
March 11, 2011	06:15	Near the east coast of Honshu, Japan see 2011 Tohoku earthquake and tsunami	36.281	141.111	18,184 dead 2,668 missing	7.9	M_{w} (USGS) Centred 57 km east of Mito, Honshu, Japan, at a depth of 42 km.	
March 11, 2011	06:25	Off the east coast of Honshu, Japan see 2011 Tohoku earthquake and tsunami	38.106	144.553	18,184 dead 2,668 missing	7.1	M_{w} (USGS) Centred 322 km east of Sendai, Honshu, Japan, at a depth of 19.7 km.	
March 24, 2011	13:55	Myanmar see 2011 Myanmar earthquake	20.687	99.822	150	6.9	M_{w} (USGS) Centred 89 km north of Chiang Rai, Thailand, at a depth of 8 km.	
April 7, 2011	14:32	Near the east coast of Honshu, Japan see April 2011 Miyagi earthquake	38.253	141.640	4	7.1	M_{w} (USGS) Centred 66 km east of Sendai, Honshu, Japan, at a depth of 49 km.	
April 11, 2011	08:16	Eastern Honshu, Japan see April 2011 Fukushima earthquake	37.007	140.477	4	6.6	M_{w} (USGS) Centred 36 km west of Iwaki, Honshu, Japan, at a depth of 10km.	
May 11, 2011	16:47	Spain see 2011 Lorca earthquake	37.699	-1.673	9	5.1	M_{w} (USGS) Centred 50 km SW of Murcia, Spain, at a depth of 1 km.	
May 19, 2011	20:15	Western Turkey see 2011 Kütahya earthquake	39.137	29.074	2	5.8	M_{w} (USGS) Centred 53 km NNW of Uşak, Turkey, at a depth of 9.1 km.	
June 13, 2011	02:20	South Island of New Zealand see June 2011 Christchurch earthquake	-43.580	172.740	1	6.0	M_{w} (USGS) Centred 13 km NNE of Christchurch, New Zealand, at a depth of 9 km.	
June 24, 2011	03:09	Fox Islands, Aleutian Islands, Alaska, United States	52.008	-171.859	0	7.2	M_{w} (USGS) Centred 64 km SW of Amukta Island, Alaska, United States, at a depth of 62.6 km.	
June 29, 2011	23:21	Eastern Honshu, Japan	36.064	137.735	1	4.7	M_{w} (USGS) Centred 76 km SSW from Nagano, Honshu, Japan, at a depth of 20.5 km.	
July 6, 2011	19:03	Kermadec Islands region, New Zealand	-29.312	-176.204	0	7.6	M_{w} (USGS) Centred 163 km east of Raoul Island, Kermadec Islands, New Zealand, at a depth of 20 km.	
July 10, 2011	00:57	Off the east coast of Honshu, Japan	38.040	143.287	0	7.0	M_{w} (USGS) Centred 212 km east of Sendai, Honshu, Japan, at a depth of 23 km.	
July 19, 2011	19:35	Kyrgyzstan see 2011 Fergana Valley earthquake	40.151	71.426	14	6.1	M_{w} (USGS) Centred 42 km SW of Fergana, Uzbekistan, at a depth of 16 km. Most damage took place in Uzbekistan.	
August 20, 2011	16:55	Vanuatu	-18.260	168.069	0	7.1	M_{w} (USGS) Centred 63 km SSW of Port Vila, Efate, Vanuatu, at a depth of 40.6 km.	
August 20, 2011	18:19	Vanuatu	-18.287	168.132	0	7.0	M_{w} (USGS) Centred 69 km SSW of Port Vila, Efate, Vanuatu, at a depth of 28.5 km.	
September 3, 2011	22:55	Vanuatu	-20.585	169.696	0	7.0	M_{w} (USGS) Centred 122 km SSE of Isangel, Tanna, Vanuatu, at a depth of 132.4 km.	
September 5, 2011	17:55	Northern Sumatra, Indonesia see 2011 Aceh Singkil Regency earthquakes	2.958	97.916	10	6.6	M_{w} (USGS) Centred 100 km SW of Medan, Sumatra, Indonesia, at a depth of 91 km.	
September 15, 2011	19:31	Fiji region	-21.559	-179.369	0	7.3	M_{w} (USGS) Centred 120 km SSW of Ndoi Island, Fiji, at a depth of 626.1 km.	
September 18, 2011	12:40	India–Nepal border region see 2011 Sikkim earthquake	27.723	88.064	111	6.9	M_{w} (USGS) Centred 68 km NW of Gangtok, Sikkim, India, at a depth of 19.7 km. Most damage took place in India.	
September 19, 2011	18:34	Guatemala	14.332	-90.142	3	5.8	M_{w} (USGS) Centred 53 km SE of GUATEMALA, Guatemala, at a depth of 9 km.	
October 21, 2011	17:57	Kermadec Islands region, New Zealand	-28.998	-176.183	0	7.4	M_{w} (USGS) Centred 169 km east of Raoul Island, Kermadec Islands, New Zealand, at a depth of 32.9 km.	
October 23, 2011	10:41	Eastern Turkey see 2011 Van earthquake	38.691	43.497	604	7.1	M_{w} (USGS) Centred 16 km NNE of Van, Turkey, at a depth of 16 km.	
October 28, 2011	18:54	Near the coast of central Peru	-14.515	-76.009	1	6.9	M_{w} (USGS) Centred 51 km SSW of Ica, Peru, at a depth of 23.9 km.	
October 29, 2011	00:43	Sikkim, India	27.449	88.684	2	3.5	M_{L} (NDI).	
November 9, 2011	19:23	Eastern Turkey see 2011 Van earthquake	38.429	43.229	40	5.6	M_{w} (USGS) Centred 16 km south of Van, Turkey, at a depth of 5 km.	
December 11, 2011	01:47	Guerrero, Mexico see 2011 Zumpango earthquake	18.038	-99.796	3	6.5	M_{w} (USGS) Centred 42 km SW of Iguala, Guerrero, Mexico, at a depth of 64.9 km.	
December 14, 2011	05:04	Eastern New Guinea region, Papua New Guinea	-7.518	146.767	0	7.1	M_{w} (USGS) Centred 89 km SSW of Lae, New Guinea, Papua New Guinea, at a depth of 121.2 km.	

== 2012 ==
Date	Time (UTC)	Place	Lat.	Long.	Fatalities	Magnitude	Comments	Source
January 10, 2012	18:36	Off the west coast of northern Sumatra, Indonesia	2.452	93.209	0	7.2	M_{w} (USGS) Centred 423 km SW of Banda Aceh, Sumatra, Indonesia, at a depth of 20.5 km.	
February 2, 2012	13:34	Vanuatu	-17.766	167.134	0	7.1	M_{w} (USGS) Centred 124 km west of PORT–VILA, Efate, Vanuatu, at a depth of 23.1 km.	
February 6, 2012	03:49	Negros–Cebu region, Philippines see 2012 Visayas earthquake	9.964	123.246	51 dead 62 missing	6.7	M_{w} (USGS) Centred 72 km north of the Dumaguete, Negros, Philippines, at a depth of 11 km.	
March 14, 2012	12:05	Near the east coast of Honshu, Japan see 2012 Chiba earthquake	35.687	140.695	1	6.0	M_{w} (USGS) Centred 5.2 km SE of Asahi, Japan, at a depth of 10.0 km.	
March 20, 2012	18:02	Oaxaca, Mexico see 2012 Guerrero–Oaxaca earthquake	16.662	-98.188	2	7.4	M_{w} (USGS) Centred 136 km SSW of Huajuapan de León, Oaxaca, Mexico, at a depth of 20 km.	
March 25, 2012	22:37	Maule, Chile see 2012 Constitución earthquake	-35.183	-71.792	1	7.1	M_{w} (USGS) Centred 27 km NNW of Talca, Maule, Chile, at a depth of 34.8 km.	
April 11, 2012	08:38	Off the west coast of northern Sumatra, Indonesia see 2012 Indian Ocean earthquakes	2.311	93.063	10	8.6	M_{w} (USGS) Centred 434 km SW of Banda Aceh, Sumatra, Indonesia, at a depth of 22.9 km.	
April 11, 2012	10:43	Off the west coast of northern Sumatra, Indonesia see 2012 Indian Ocean earthquakes	0.773	92.452	10	8.2	M_{w} (USGS) Centred 618 km SSW of Banda Aceh, Sumatra, Indonesia, at a depth of 16.4 km.	
April 17, 2012	03:50	Offshore Valparaíso, Chile	-32.701	-71.484	2	6.7	M_{w} (USGS) Centred 42 km NNE of Valparaíso, Valparaíso, Chile, at a depth of 37 km.	
May 7, 2012	04:40	Azerbaijan	41.541	46.766	2	5.6	M_{w} (USGS) Centred 14 km SE of Zaqatala (Zakataly), Azerbaijan, at a depth of 23.3 km.	
May 12, 2012	23:28	Tajikistan	38.612	70.354	1	5.7	M_{w} (USGS) Centred 44km SE of Darband, Tajikistan, at a depth of 10.0km.	
May 20, 2012	02:03	Northern Italy see 2012 Northern Italy earthquakes	44.800	11.192	7	6.0	M_{w} (USGS) Centred 36 km NNW of Bologna, Italy, at a depth of 5.1 km.	
May 22, 2012	00:00	Bulgaria see 2012 Pernik earthquake	42.686	23.009	1	5.6	M_{w} (USGS) Centred 24 km west of SOFIA, Bulgaria, at a depth of 9.4 km.	
May 29, 2012	07:00	Northern Italy see 2012 Northern Italy earthquakes	44.814	11.079	20	5.8	M_{w} (USGS) Centred 40 km NNW of Bologna, Italy, at a depth of 9.6 km.	
June 11, 2012	05:29	Hindu Kush region, Afghanistan see 2012 Afghanistan earthquakes	36.082	69.316	75	5.7	M_{w} (USGS) Centred 161 km SW of Faizabad, Afghanistan, at a depth of 15 km.	
June 24, 2012	07:59	Sichuan–Yunnan border region, China	27.767	100.768	4	5.5	M_{w} (USGS) Centred 53 km WSW of Qiaowa, China, at a depth of 9.3 km.	
July 20, 2012	12:11	Jiangsu, China see 2012 Yangzhou earthquake	32.990	119.645	1	4.9	M_{w} (USGS) Centred 10 km SE of Wangying, China, at a depth of 13.9 km.	
July 25, 2012	00:27	Simeulue, Indonesia	2.657	96.126	1	6.4	M_{w} (USGS) Centred 28 km NW of Sinabang, Indonesia, at a depth of 22 km.	
August 11, 2012	12:23	Northwestern Iran see 2012 East Azerbaijan earthquakes	38.322	46.888	306	6.4	M_{w} (USGS) Centred 20 km WSW of Ahar, Iran, at a depth of 9.9 km.	
August 14, 2012	02:59	Sea of Okhotsk	49.784	145.126	0	7.7	M_{w} (USGS) Centred 158 km ENE of Poronaysk, Russia, at a depth of 625.9 km.	
August 18, 2012	09:41	Sulawesi, Indonesia	-1.343	120.103	6	6.3	M_{w} (USGS) Centred 56 km SSE of Palu, Indonesia, at a depth of 19.9 km.	
August 27, 2012	04:37	Offshore El Salvador see 2012 El Salvador earthquake	12.278	-88.528	0	7.3	M_{w} (USGS) Centred 111 km south of Puerto El Triunfo, El Salvador, at a depth of 20.3 km.	
August 31, 2012	12:47	(Philippines) Philippine Islands region see 2012 Samar earthquake	10.838	126.704	1	7.6	M_{w} (USGS) Centred 94 km east of Sulangan, Philippines, at a depth of 34.9 km.	
September 5, 2012	14:42	Costa Rica see 2012 Costa Rica earthquake	10.086	-85.305	2	7.6	M_{w} (USGS) Centred 10 km NE of Hojancha, Costa Rica, at a depth of 40 km.	
September 7, 2012	03:19	Sichuan–Yunnan–Guizhou region, China see 2012 Yunnan earthquakes	27.541	103.973	81	5.6	M_{w} (USGS) Centred 8 km SSE of Jiaokui, China, at a depth of 10 km.	
September 7, 2012	04:16	Sichuan–Yunnan–Guizhou region, China see 2012 Yunnan earthquakes	27.582	103.990	81	5.6	M_{w} (USGS) Centred 2 km SW of Jiaokui, China, at a depth of 9.8 km.	
September 30, 2012	16:31	Colombia	1.916	-76.355	0	7.3	M_{w} (USGS) Centred 9 km WNW of Isnos, Colombia, at a depth of 168.3 km.	
October 25, 2012	23:05	Southern Italy	39.855	16.044	1	5.3	M_{w} (USGS) Centred 5 km west of Morano Calabro, Italy, at a depth of 3.8 km.	
October 28, 2012	03:04	Queen Charlotte Islands region, Canada see 2012 Haida Gwaii earthquake	52.769	-131.927	0	7.7	M_{w} (USGS) Centred 139 km south of Masset, Canada, at a depth of 20.1 km.	
November 7, 2012	16:35	Offshore Guatemala see 2012 Guatemala earthquake	14.083	-91.916	39	7.4	M_{w} (USGS) Centred 24 km south of Champerico, Guatemala, at a depth of 41.6 km.	
November 11, 2012	01:12	Myanmar see 2012 Shwebo earthquake	23.014	95.883	26 dead 12 missing	6.8	M_{w} (USGS) Centred 117 km north of Mandalay, Myanmar, at a depth of 9.8 km.	
December 5, 2012	17:08	Eastern Iran see 2012 Zohan earthquake	33.490	59.554	8 dead 1 missing	5.6	M_{w} (USGS) Centred 73 km NNE of Birjand, Iran, at a depth of 5.6 km.	
December 7, 2012	08:18	Off the east coast of Honshu, Japan see 2012 Kamaishi earthquake	37.889	144.090	3	7.3	M_{w} (USGS) Centred 245 km SE of Kamaishi, Japan, at a depth of 36.1 km.	
December 10, 2012	16:53	Banda Sea	-6.540	129.815	0	7.1	M_{w} (USGS) Centred 229 km NW of Saumlaki, Indonesia, at a depth of 159.3 km.	

== 2013 ==
Date	Time (UTC)	Place	Lat.	Long.	Fatalities	Magnitude	Comments	Source
January 5, 2013	08:58	Southeastern Alaska, United States see 2013 Craig earthquake	55.238	-134.777	0	7.5	M_{w} (USGS) Centred 102 km west of Craig, Alaska, United States, at a depth of 9.9 km.	
January 21, 2013	22:22	Northern Sumatra, Indonesia	4.961	96.083	1	6.1	M_{w} (USGS) Centred 34 km SSW of Reuleuet, Indonesia, at a depth of 16.6 km.	
January 30, 2013	20:15	(Chile) Atacama, Chile see 2013 Vallenar earthquake	-28.181	-70.800	1	6.8	M_{w} (USGS) Centred 44 km north of Vallenar, Chile, at a depth of 45.7 km.	
February 6, 2013	01:12	Santa Cruz Islands, Solomon Islands see 2013 Solomon Islands earthquake	-10.738	165.138	13 dead 5 missing	8.0	M_{w} (USGS) Centred 81 km west of Lata, Solomon Islands, at a depth of 28.7 km.	
February 6, 2013	01:23	Santa Cruz Islands, Solomon Islands see 2013 Solomon Islands earthquake	-11.254	164.932	13 dead 5 missing	7.1	M_{w} (USGS) Centred 114 km WSW of Lata, Solomon Islands, at a depth of 10.1 km.	
February 6, 2013	01:54	Santa Cruz Islands, Solomon Islands see 2013 Solomon Islands earthquake	-10.479	165.772	13 dead 5 missing	7.0	M_{w} (USGS) Centred 25 km NNW of Lata, Solomon Islands, at a depth of 9.8 km.	
February 8, 2013	15:26	Santa Cruz Islands, Solomon Islands see 2013 Solomon Islands earthquake	-10.932	166.021	0	7.1	M_{w} (USGS) Centred 31 km SE of Lata, Solomon Islands, at a depth of 21 km.	
March 27, 2013	02:03	Taiwan see March 2013 Nantou earthquake	23.840	121.135	1	6.0	M_{w} (USGS) Centred 48 km WSW from Hualien, Taiwan, at a depth of 20.7 km.	
April 6, 2013	04:42	Papua, Indonesia	-3.526	138.466	0	7.0	M_{w} (USGS) Centred 238 km east of Enarotali, Indonesia, at a depth of 68 km.	
April 9, 2013	11:52	Southern Iran see 2013 Bushehr earthquake	28.500	51.591	37	6.4	M_{w} (USGS) Centred 89 km SE of Bushehr, Iran, at a depth of 10.0 km.	
April 16, 2013	10:44	Iran–Pakistan border region see 2013 Saravan earthquake	28.107	62.053	35	7.7	M_{w} (USGS) Centred 83 km east of Khash, Iran, at a depth of 82.0 km. Most damage took place in Pakistan.	
April 19, 2013	03:05	Kuril Islands, Russia	46.182	150.796	0	7.2	M_{w} (USGS) Centred 250 km ENE of Kuril'sk, Russia, at a depth of 122.3 km.	
April 20, 2013	00:02	Western Sichuan, China see 2013 Lushan earthquake	30.284	102.956	193 dead 24 missing	6.6	M_{w} (USGS) Centred 52 km WSW of Linqiong, China, at a depth of 12.3 km.	
April 24, 2013	09:25	Hindu kush region, Afghanistan see 2013 Laghman earthquake	34.517	70.207	18	5.6	M_{w} (USGS) Centred 11 km south of Mehtar Lam, Afghanistan, at a depth of 62.1 km.	
May 1, 2013	06:57	Eastern Kashmir	33.100	75.838	2	5.4	M_{w} (USGS) Centred 17 km NE of Bhadarwah, India, at a depth of 9.8 km.	
May 11, 2013	02:08	Southern Iran	26.712	57.886	1	6.1	M_{w} (USGS) Centred 93 km ESE of Minab, Iran, at a depth of 14.0 km.	
May 23, 2013	17:19	South of the Fiji Islands	-23.025	-177.109	0	7.4	M_{w} (USGS) Centred 282 km SW of Vaini, Tonga, at a depth of 171.4 km.	
May 24, 2013	05:44	(Russia) Sea of Okhotsk see 2013 Okhotsk Sea earthquake	54.874	153.281	0	8.3	M_{w} (USGS) Centred 362 km WSW of Esso, Russia, at a depth of 608.9 km.	
June 2, 2013	05:43	Taiwan see June 2013 Nantou earthquake	23.794	121.133	4	6.2	M_{w} (USGS) Centred 25 km SE of Buli, Taiwan, at a depth of 17.0 km.	
July 2, 2013	07:37	Northern Sumatra, Indonesia see 2013 Aceh earthquake	4.698	96.687	35 dead 8 missing	6.1	M_{w} (USGS) Centred 55 km south of Bireun, Indonesia, at a depth of 10.0 km.	
July 7, 2013	18:35	New Ireland region, Papua New Guinea	-3.923	153.920	0	7.3	M_{w} (USGS) Centred 115 km ENE of Taron, Papua New Guinea, at a depth of 386.3 km.	
July 15, 2013	14:03	(South Georgia and the South Sandwich Islands) South Sandwich Islands region	-60.868	-25.144	0	7.3	M_{w} (USGS) Centred 218 km SSE of Bristol Island, South Sandwich Islands, at a depth of 31.0 km.	
July 21, 2013	23:45	Gansu, China see 2013 Dingxi earthquake	34.499	104.243	95	5.9	M_{w} (USGS) Centred 13 km east of Chabu, China, at a depth of 9.8 km.	
August 30, 2013	16:25	Andreanof Islands, Aleutian Islands, Alaska, United States	51.610	-175.361	0	7.0	M_{w} (USGS) Centred 94 km ESE of Adak, Alaska, United States, at a depth of 33.5 km.	
August 31, 2013	00:04	Sichuan–Yunnan border region, China	28.229	99.370	5	5.8	M_{w} (USGS) Centred 0 km south of Benzilan, China, at a depth of 9.8 km.	
September 7, 2013	00:13	Guatemala	14.606	-92.121	1	6.4	M_{w} (USGS) Centred 7 km SSE of Ciudad Tecun Uman, Guatemala, at a depth of 66.0 km.	
September 24, 2013	11:29	Pakistan see 2013 Balochistan earthquakes	26.971	65.520	825	7.7	M_{w} (USGS) Centred 63 km NNE of Awaran, Pakistan, at a depth of 15.0 km.	
September 25, 2013	16:42	Near the coast of southern Peru	-15.839	-74.509	3	7.1	M_{w} (USGS) Centred 46 km SSE of Acari, Peru, at a depth of 40.0 km.	
September 28, 2013	07:34	Pakistan see 2013 Balochistan earthquakes	27.263	65.587	22	6.8	M_{w} (USGS) Centred 96 km NNE of Awaran, Pakistan, at a depth of 14.8 km.	
October 15, 2013	00:12	Bohol, Philippines see 2013 Bohol earthquake	9.880	124.117	222 dead 8 missing	7.1	M_{w} (USGS) Centred 4 km SE of Sagbayan, Philippines, at a depth of 19.0 km.	
October 22, 2013	05:40	Northern Sumatra, Indonesia	5.103	95.971	1	5.4	M_{w} (USGS) Centred 31 km south of Sigli, Indonesia, at a depth of 48.3 km.	
October 25, 2013	17:10	Off the east coast of Honshu, Japan	37.149	144.679	0	7.1	M_{w} (USGS) Centred 328 km east of Namie, Japan, at a depth of 26.1 km.	
November 17, 2013	09:04	Scotia Sea	-60.274	-46.401	0	7.7	M_{w} (USGS) Centred 893 km SW of Grytviken, South Georgia and the South Sandwich Islands, at a depth of 10.0 km.	
November 25, 2013	06:27	Falkland Islands region	-53.945	-55.003	0	7.0	M_{w} (USGS) Centred 314 km SE of Stanley, Falkland Islands, at a depth of 11.8 km.	
November 28, 2013	13:51	Southern Iran see 2013 Borazjan earthquake	29.320	51.310	7	5.8	M_{w} (USGS) Centred 10 km ENE of Borazjan, Iran, at a depth of 8.0 km.	

== 2014 ==
Date	Time (UTC)	Place	Lat.	Long.	Fatalities	Magnitude	Comments	Source
January 2, 2014	03:13	Southern Iran	27.150	54.448	1	5.2	M_{w} (USGS) Centred 60 km south of Lar, Iran, at a depth of 8.0 km.	
April 1, 2014	23:46	Near the coast of Tarapacá, Chile see 2014 Iquique earthquake	-19.642	-70.817	6	8.2	M_{w} (USGS) Centred 95 km NW of Iquique, Chile, at a depth of 20.1 km.	
April 3, 2014	02:43	Near the coast of Tarapacá, Chile see 2014 Iquique earthquake	-20.518	-70.498	0	7.7	M_{w} (USGS) Centred 49 km SW of Iquique, Chile, at a depth of 31.1 km.	
April 10, 2014	23:27	Nicaragua see April 2014 Nicaragua earthquake	12.514	-86.379	2	6.1	M_{w} (USGS) Centred 16 km SW of Valle San Francisco, Nicaragua, at a depth of 13.0 km.	
April 11, 2014	07:07	Bougainville Island region, Papua New Guinea	-6.625	155.064	1	7.1	M_{w} (USGS) Centred 57 km SW of Panguna, Papua New Guinea, at a depth of 50.0 km.	
April 12, 2014	20:14	Solomon Islands	-11.315	162.211	0	7.6	M_{w} (USGS) Centred 100 km SSE of Kirakira, Solomon Islands, at a depth of 29.3 km.	
April 13, 2014	12:36	Solomon Islands	-11.451	162.069	0	7.4	M_{w} (USGS) Centred 111 km south of Kirakira, Solomon Islands, at a depth of 35.0 km.	
April 18, 2014	14:27	Guerrero, Mexico see 2014 Guerrero earthquake	17.397	-100.972	0	7.2	M_{w} (USGS) Centred 33 km ESE of Petatlán, Mexico, at a depth of 24.0 km.	
April 19, 2014	13:27	Bougainville Island region, Papua New Guinea	-6.720	154.932	0	7.5	M_{w} (USGS) Centred 75 km SW of Panguna, Papua New Guinea, at a depth of 30.9 km.	
May 5, 2014	11:08	Thailand see 2014 Mae Lao earthquake	19.656	99.670	1	6.1	M_{w} (USGS) Centred 13 km NNW of Phan, Thailand, at a depth of 6.0 km.	
May 8, 2014	22:51	Pakistan see 2014 Pakistan earthquake	26.387	68.358	2	4.5	M_{w} (USGS) Centred 8 km SSE of Daur, Pakistan, at a depth of 14.7 km.	
May 21, 2014	16:21	Bay of Bengal	18.201	88.038	2	6.0	M_{w} (USGS) Centred 276km SE of Konark, India, at a depth of 47.2km.	
June 13, 2014	13:32	Eastern Kashmir	33.292	75.581	2	5.0	M_{b} (USGS) Centred 16km north of Doda, India, at a depth of 42.7km.	
June 23, 2014	20:53	Rat Islands, Aleutian Islands, Alaska, United States see 2014 Aleutian Islands earthquake	51.797	178.760	0	7.9	M_{w} (USGS) Centred 24 km SE of Little Sitkin Island, Alaska, United States, at a depth of 107.5 km.	
July 7, 2014	11:23	Offshore Chiapas, Mexico see 2014 Mexico–Guatemala earthquake	14.724	-92.461	8	6.9	M_{w} (USGS) Centred 4 km west of Puerto Madero, Mexico, at a depth of 53.0 km.	
July 29, 2014	10:46	Veracruz, Mexico	17.982	-95.653	1	6.3	M_{w} (USGS) Centred 2 km southeast of Santa Teresa, Mexico, at a depth of 107.0 km.	
August 1, 2014	04:11	Northern Algeria	36.851	3.161	6	5.6	M_{w} (USGS) Centred 11 km NNW of Bordj el Kiffan, Algeria, at a depth of 10.0 km.	
August 3, 2014	08:30	Yunnan, China see 2014 Ludian earthquake	27.189	103.409	617 dead 112 missing	6.2	M_{w} (USGS) Centred 11 km west of Wenping, China, at a depth of 12.0 km.	
August 5, 2014	10:22	South Africa see 2014 Orkney earthquake	-26.972	26.709	1	5.4	M_{w} (USGS) Centred 3 km ENE of Orkney, South Africa, at a depth of 4.1 km.	
August 12, 2014	19:58	Ecuador see 2014 Ecuador earthquake	-0.018	-78.322	4	5.1	M_{w} (USGS) Centred 22 km WSW of Cayambe, Ecuador, at a depth of 11.9 km.	
August 24, 2014	10:20	Northern California, United States see 2014 South Napa earthquake	38.215	-122.312	1	6.0	M_{w} (USGS) Centred 6 km NW of American Canyon, California, United States, at a depth of 11.1 km.	
September 28, 2014	02:35	Central Peru see 2014 Peru earthquake	-13.814	-71.744	8	4.9	M_{w} (USGS) Centred 19 km SW of Urcos, Peru, at a depth of 43.2 km.	
October 7, 2014	13:49	Yunnan, China see 2014 Jinggu earthquake	23.386	100.487	1	6.0	M_{w} (USGS) Centred 22 km WSW of Weiyuan, China, at a depth of 10.9 km.	
October 9, 2014	02:14	Southern East Pacific Rise	-32.108	-110.811	0	7.0	M_{w} (USGS) Centred 565 km SSW of Hanga Roa, Chile, at a depth of 16.5 km.	
October 14, 2014	03:51	Offshore El Salvador see October 2014 Nicaragua earthquake	12.526	-88.123	4	7.3	M_{w} (USGS) Centred 74 km south of Intipucá, El Salvador, at a depth of 40.0 km.	
November 1, 2014	18:57	Fiji region	-19.698	-177.794	0	7.1	M_{w} (USGS) Centred 141 km NE of Ndoi Island, Fiji, at a depth of 434.4 km.	
November 15, 2014	02:31	Molucca Sea	1.928	126.547	0	7.1	M_{w} (USGS) Centred 156 km NW of Kota Ternate, Indonesia, at a depth of 35.0 km.	
November 22, 2014	08:55	Western Sichuan, China see 2014 Kangding earthquake	30.343	101.720	5	5.9	M_{w} (USGS) Centred 39 km NW of Kangding, China, at a depth of 14.6 km.	
December 6, 2014	10:20	Yunnan, China	23.358	100.533	1	5.6	M_{w} (USGS) Centred 19 km SW of Weiyuan, China, at a depth of 10.0 km.	
December 7, 2014	21:16	offshore Guatemala	13.672	-91.473	1	6.1	M_{w} (USGS) Centred 61 km SSW of Nueva Concepcion, Guatemala, at a depth of 32.0 km.	

== 2015 ==
Date	Time (UTC)	Place	Lat.	Long.	Fatalities	Magnitude	Comments	Source
February 13, 2015	18:59	Northern Mid–Atlantic Ridge	52.669	-31.924	0	7.1	M_{w} (USGS) Centred 1165 km SE of Nanortalik, Greenland, Denmark, at a depth of 13.8 km.	
February 21, 2015	21:21	Bosnia and Herzegovina	44.51	18.92	4	3.7	M_{L} (EMSC) Centred 10 km S of Priboj, Bosnia and Herzegovina, at a depth of 2.0 km. All fatalities were underground miners.	
February 27, 2015	13:45	(Indonesia) Flores Sea	-7.288	122.532	0	7.0	M_{w} (USGS) Centred 131 km north of Nebe, Indonesia, at a depth of 552.3 km.	
March 14, 2015	06:13	Henan-Anhui border region, China	33.150	115.800	2	4.6	M_{b} (USGS) Centred 27 km north of Fuyang, China, at a depth of 10.0 km.	
March 29, 2015	23:48	New Britain region, Papua New Guinea	-4.760	152.556	0	7.5	M_{w} (USGS) Centred 55 km SE of Kokopo, Papua New Guinea, at a depth of 40.0 km.	
April 15, 2015	07:39	Nei Mongol-Ningxia border region, China	39.753	106.703	1	5.4	M_{w} (USGS) Centred 36 km WNW of Wuhai, China, at a depth of 10.0 km.	
April 20, 2015	01:42	Taiwan region	24.194	122.327	1	6.4	M_{w} (USGS) Centred 66 km SE of Su'ao, Taiwan, at a depth of 29.0 km.	
April 25, 2015	06:11	Nepal see April 2015 Nepal earthquake	28.147	84.708	9,018	7.8	M_{w} (USGS) Centred 34 km ESE of Lamjung, Nepal, at a depth of 15.0 km.	
May 2, 2015	05:35	Nepal	28.314	84.658	4	4.9	M_{b} (USGS) Centred 67 km E of Pokhara, Nepal, at a depth of 10.0 km.	
May 5, 2015	01:44	New Britain region, Papua New Guinea	-5.465	151.886	0	7.5	M_{w} (USGS) Centred 130 km SSW of Kokopo, Papua New Guinea, at a depth of 42.0 km.	
May 7, 2015	07:10	Bougainville region, Papua New Guinea	-7.226	154.551	0	7.1	M_{w} (USGS) Centred 144 km SW of Panguna, Papua New Guinea, at a depth of 23.2 km.	
May 12, 2015	07:05	Nepal see May 2015 Nepal earthquake	27.837	86.077	218	7.3	M_{w} (USGS) Centred 18 km SE of Kodari, Nepal, at a depth of 15.0 km.	
May 16, 2015	11:34	Nepal	27.560	86.073	2	5.5	M_{w} (USGS) Centred 45 km SSE of Kodari, Nepal, at a depth of 7.0 km. Both fatalities occurred in Bihar, India.	
May 30, 2015	11:23	Ogasawara Islands, Japan region	27.831	140.493	0	7.8	M_{w} (USGS) Centred 189 km WNW of Chichi–shima, Japan, at a depth of 677.6 km.	
June 4, 2015	23:15	Sabah, Malaysia see 2015 Sabah earthquake	5.982	116.539	18	6.0	M_{w} (USGS) Centred 14 km WNW of Ranau, Malaysia, at a depth of 10.0 km.	
June 17, 2015	12:51	Southern Mid–Atlantic Ridge	-35.362	-17.392	0	7.0	M_{w} (USGS) Centred 494 km WNW of Edinburgh of the Seven Seas, Saint Helena, at a depth of 10.0 km.	
July 3, 2015	01:07	Southern Xinjiang, China see 2015 Pishan earthquake	37.460	78.125	3	6.4	M_{w} (USGS) Centred 95 km SE of Yilkiqi, China, at a depth of 20.0 km.	
July 3, 2015	06:43	Leyte, Philippines	10.169	125.891	1	6.1	M_{w} (USGS) Centred 23 km NW of Santa Monica, Philippines, at a depth of 32.0 km.	
July 18, 2015	02:27	Santa Cruz Islands, Solomon Islands	-10.444	165.172	0	7.0	M_{w} (USGS) Centred 78 km WNW of Lata, Solomon Islands, at a depth of 10.0 km.	
July 24, 2015	20:59	Pakistan see 2015 Islamabad earthquake	33.884	73.225	3	5.1	M_{b} (USGS) Centred 15 km west of Murree, Pakistan, at a depth of 19.2 km.	
July 27, 2015	21:41	Papua, Indonesia	-2.683	138.508	1	7.0	M_{w} (USGS) Centred 230 km west of Abepura, Indonesia, at a depth of 48.0 km.	
August 7, 2015	01:25	Lac Kivu region, Democratic Republic of the Congo see 2015 South Kivu earthquake	-2.141	28.897	1	5.8	M_{w} (USGS) Centred 37 km north of Cyangugu, Rwanda, at a depth of 11 km.	
September 3, 2015	17:57	Rajasthan, India	27.377	75.494	1	4.0	M_{b} (USGS) Centred 7 km west of Ringas, India, at a depth of 14.2 km.	
September 16, 2015	22:54	Offshore Coquimbo, Chile see 2015 Illapel earthquake	-31.570	-71.654	14 dead 6 missing	8.3	M_{w} (USGS) Centred 46 km west of Illapel, Chile, at a depth of 25.0 km.	
September 16, 2015	23:18	Coquimbo, Chile see 2015 Illapel earthquake	-31.587	-71.431	0	7.0	M_{w} (USGS) Centred 25 km west of Illapel, Chile, at a depth of 30.9 km.	
October 17, 2015	11:33	Salta, Argentina	-25.467	-64.484	1	5.8	M_{w} (USGS) Centred 19 km ESE of El Galpón, Argentina, at a depth of 17.0 km.	
October 20, 2015	21:52	Vanuatu	-14.842	167.306	0	7.1	M_{w} (USGS) Centred 35 km NE of Port–Olry, Vanuatu, at a depth of 127.1 km.	
October 26, 2015	09:09	Hindu kush region, Afghanistan see October 2015 Hindu Kush earthquake	36.526	70.362	398	7.5	M_{w} (USGS) Centred 45 km east of Farkhar, Afghanistan, at a depth of 231.0 km. Most damage took place in Pakistan.	
November 7, 2015	06:58	Mérida, Venezuela	8.477	-71.365	1	5.3	M_{w} (USGS) Centred 4 km SSE of Lagunillas, Venezuela, at a depth of 13.5 km.	
November 17, 2015	07:10	Greece	38.755	20.552	2	6.5	M_{w} (USGS) Centred 14 km WNW of Nidri, Greece, at a depth of 11.1 km.	
November 22, 2015	18:16	Hindu Kush region, Afghanistan	36.434	71.423	2	5.7	M_{w} (USGS) Centred 29 km SSW of Ashkasham, Afghanistan, at a depth of 102.0 km. Both fatalities is from Pakistan.	
November 22, 2015	20:38	Mérida, Venezuela	8.531	-71.395	1	5.3	M_{w} (USGS) Centred 2 km NNW of Lagunillas, Venezuela, at a depth of 28.1 km.	
November 23, 2015	20:41	Guerrero, Mexico	17.077	-98.800	2	5.5	M_{w} (USGS) Centred 29 km NNW of San Luis Acatlán, Mexico, at a depth of 42.5 km.	
November 24, 2015	22:45	Peru–Brazil border region	-10.548	-70.904	0	7.6	M_{w} (USGS) Centred 169 km WNW of Iberia, Peru, at a depth of 600.6 km.	
November 24, 2015	22:50	Central Peru	-10.048	-71.023	0	7.6	M_{w} (USGS) Centred 210 km south of Tarauacá, Brazil, at a depth of 611.7 km.	
December 4, 2015	22:25	Southeast Indian Ridge	-47.617	85.091	0	7.1	M_{w} (USGS) Centred 1023 km ENE of Heard Island, Heard Island and McDonald Islands, at a depth of 35.0 km.	
December 7, 2015	07:50	Tajikistan see 2015 Tajikistan earthquake	38.258	72.767	2	7.2	M_{w} (USGS) Centred 105 km west of Murghob, Tajikistan, at a depth of 26.0 km.	
December 17, 2015	19:49	Near the coast of Chiapas, Mexico	15.802	-93.633	2	6.6	M_{w} (USGS) Centred 4 km west of Manuel Ávila Camacho, Mexico, at a depth of 85.0 km.	
December 25, 2015	19:14	Hindu kush region, Afghanistan see December 2015 Hindu Kush earthquake	36.500	71.132	4	6.3	M_{w} (USGS) Centred 41 km WSW of Ashkasham, Afghanistan, at a depth of 203.4 km. Most damage took place in Pakistan.	

== 2016 ==
Date	Time (UTC)	Place	Lat.	Long.	Fatalities	Magnitude	Comments	Source
January 3, 2016	23:05	Manipur, India region see 2016 Imphal earthquake	24.807	93.651	11	6.7	M_{w} (USGS) Centred 30 km west of Imphal, India, at a depth of 55.0 km.	
January 16, 2016	23:22	Seram, Indonesia	-3.873	127.229	1	5.6	M_{w} (USGS) Centred 107 km west of Ambon, Indonesia, at a depth of 4.1 km.	
January 24, 2016	10:30	Southern Alaska, United States see 2016 Old Iliamna earthquake	59.605	-153.341	0	7.1	M_{w} (USGS) Centred 87 km WSW of Anchor Point, Alaska, United States, at a depth of 123.4 km.	
January 25, 2016	04:22	Strait of Gibraltar see 2016 Alboran Sea earthquake	35.649	-3.682	1	6.3	M_{w} (USGS) Centred 50 km NNE of Al Hoceima, Morocco, at a depth of 12.0 km. The fatality took place in Spain's north African enclave.	
January 30, 2016	03:25	Near the east coast of the Kamchatka Peninsula, Russia	54.007	158.506	0	7.2	M_{w} (USGS) Centred 91 km north of Yelizovo, Russia, at a depth of 161.0 km.	
February 5, 2016	16:20	Nepal	27.878	85.338	1	5.2	M_{b} (USGS) Centred 19 km north of Kathmandu, Nepal, at a depth of 23.5 km. The fatality took place in India.	
February 5, 2016	19:57	Taiwan see 2016 Taiwan earthquake	22.939	120.593	117	6.4	M_{w} (USGS) Centred 24 km SSE of Yujing, Taiwan, at a depth of 23.0 km.	
March 2, 2016	12:49	Southwest of Sumatra, Indonesia see 2016 Sumatra earthquake	-4.908	94.275	0	7.8	M_{w} (USGS) Centred 659 km SW of Muara Siberut, Indonesia, at a depth of 24.0 km.	
April 10, 2016	10:28	Hindu kush region, Afghanistan see 2016 Afghanistan earthquake	36.492	71.156	6	6.6	M_{w} (USGS) Centred 39 km WSW of Ashkasham, Afghanistan, at a depth of 210.4 km. Most damage took place in Pakistan.	
April 13, 2016	13:55	Myanmar see April 2016 Myanmar earthquake	23.133	94.900	2	6.9	M_{w} (USGS) Centred 74 km SE of Mawlaik, Myanmar, at a depth of 134.8 km.	
April 14, 2016	12:26	Kyushu, Japan see 2016 Kumamoto earthquakes	32.788	130.704	277	6.2	M_{w} (USGS) Centred 3 km west of Kumamoto–shi, Japan, at a depth of 9.0 km.	
April 15, 2016	16:25	Kyushu, Japan see 2016 Kumamoto earthquakes	32.793	130.749	277	7.0	M_{w} (USGS) Centred 0 km ENE of Kumamoto–shi, Japan, at a depth of 10.0 km.	
April 16, 2016	23:58	Near the coast of Ecuador see 2016 Ecuador earthquake	0.352	-79.926	676 dead 8 missing	7.8	M_{w} (USGS) Centred 27 km SSE of Muisne, Ecuador, at a depth of 20.6 km.	
April 28, 2016	19:33	Vanuatu	-16.041	167.380	0	7.0	M_{w} (USGS) Centred 2 km north of Norsup, Vanuatu, at a depth of 24.0 km.	
May 18, 2016	16:46	Near the coast of Ecuador	0.498	-79.612	1	6.9	M_{w} (USGS) Centred 24 km NW of Rosa Zárate, Ecuador, at a depth of 30.0 km.	
May 24, 2016	17:43	Yemen	14.089	45.329	4	4.9	M_{b} (USGS) Centred 28 km west northwest of Al Bayda, Yemen, at a depth of 10.0 km.	
May 28, 2016	09:46	(South Georgia and the South Sandwich Islands) South Sandwich Islands region	-56.203	-26.893	0	7.2	M_{w} (USGS) Centred 58 km NNE of Visokoi Island, South Georgia and the South Sandwich Islands, at a depth of 72.7 km.	
June 1, 2016	22:56	Mentawai Islands region, Indonesia	-2.097	100.665	1	6.6	M_{w} (USGS) Centred 79 km west of Sungaipenuh, Indonesia, at a depth of 50.0 km.	
July 10, 2016	09:31	Northern Sumatra, Indonesia	0.031	100.090	1	5.1	M_{b} (USGS) Centred 48 km northwest of Bukittinggi, Indonesia, at a depth of 8.1 km.	
July 11, 2016	02:11	Near the coast of Ecuador	0.581	-79.638	2	6.3	M_{w} (USGS) Centred 33 km NW of Rosa Zárate, Ecuador, at a depth of 21.0 km.	
July 29, 2016	21:18	Pagan region, Northern Mariana Islands	18.515	145.529	0	7.7	M_{w} (USGS) Centred 31 km SSW of Agrihan, Northern Mariana Islands, at a depth of 212.4 km.	
August 1, 2016	04:46	Azerbaijan	39.958	47.975	1	5.0	M_{w} (USGS) Centred 12 km NW of Imishli, Azerbaijan, at a depth of 16.0 km. The fatality is an Iranian.	
August 12, 2016	01:26	Southeast of the Loyalty Islands, New Caledonia	-22.495	173.111	0	7.2	M_{w} (USGS) Centred 109 km east of Île Hunter, New Caledonia, at a depth of 10.0 km.	
August 15, 2016	02:59	Southern Peru	-15.657	-72.005	5	5.5	M_{w} (USGS) Centred 39 km north of Lluta, Peru, at a depth of 20.0 km.	
August 19, 2016	07:32	(South Georgia and the South Sandwich Islands) South Georgia Island region	-55.279	-31.874	0	7.4	M_{w} (USGS).	
August 24, 2016	01:36	Central Italy see August 2016 Central Italy earthquake	42.714	13.172	299	6.2	M_{w} (USGS) Centred 10 km SE of Norcia, Italy, at a depth of 10.0 km.	
August 24, 2016	10:34	Myanmar see August 2016 Myanmar earthquake	20.919	94.579	4	6.8	M_{w} (USGS) Centred 25 km west of Chauk, Myanmar, at a depth of 84.1 km.	
August 29, 2016	04:29	North of Ascension Island	-0.041	-17.826	0	7.1	M_{w} (USGS).	
September 2, 2016	16:37	Off the east coast of the North Island of New Zealand see 2016 Te Araroa earthquake	-37.359	179.146	0	7.0	M_{w} (USGS) Centred 175 km NE of Gisborne, New Zealand, at a depth of 19.0 km.	
September 10, 2016	12:27	Lake Victoria region, Tanzania see 2016 Tanzania earthquake	-1.030	31.560	23	5.9	M_{w} (USGS) Centred 22 km NE of Nsunga, Tanzania, at a depth of 40.0 km.	
September 22, 2016	20:24	Pakistan	26.149	68.152	1	4.6	M_{w} (USGS) Centred 11 km north of Sann, Pakistan, at a depth of 10.0 km.	
September 23, 2016	16:11	Burundi	-2.611	29.107	7	4.8	M_{w} (USGS) Centred 26 km ESE of Cyangugu, Rwanda, at a depth of 10.0 km. Most damage took place in Democratic Republic of the Congo.	
September 28, 2016	16:48	Nicaragua	12.446	-86.534	1	5.5	M_{w} (USGS) Centred 19 km NE of La Paz Centro, Nicaragua, at a depth of 7.5 km.	
October 1, 2016	08:04	Pakistan	34.949	73.631	2	5.4	M_{w} (USGS) Centred 48 km NNW of Athmuqam, Pakistan, at a depth of 43.4 km.	
October 16, 2016	13:04	off the coast of Northern Peru	-7.009	-80.125	1	5.0	M_{b} (USGS) Centred 28 km southwest of Pimentel, Peru, at a depth of 40.7 km.	
October 17, 2016	07:14	Xizang–Qinghai border region, China	32.906	94.880	1	5.9	M_{w} (USGS) Centred 135 km NE of Dartang, China, at a depth of 23.3 km.	
October 26, 2016	19:18	Central Italy see October 2016 Central Italy earthquakes	42.934	13.043	3	6.1	M_{w} (USGS) Centred 3 km west of Visso, Italy, at a depth of 10.0 km.	
October 30, 2016	06:40	Central Italy see October 2016 Central Italy earthquakes	42.855	13.088	3	6.6	M_{w} (USGS) Centred 6 km north of Norcia, Italy, at a depth of 10.0 km.	
November 13, 2016	11:02	South Island of New Zealand see 2016 Kaikōura earthquake	-42.757	173.077	2	7.8	M_{w} (USGS) Centred 56 km NNE of Amberley, New Zealand, at a depth of 22.0 km.	
November 24, 2016	18:43	Off the coast of Central America	11.960	-88.836	1	7.0	M_{w} (USGS) Centred 149 km SSW of Puerto El Triunfo, El Salvador, at a depth of 10.3 km.	
November 25, 2016	14:24	Southern Xinjiang, China	39.238	74.047	1	6.6	M_{w} (USGS) Centred 49 km ENE of Karakul, Tajikistan, at a depth of 12.6 km.	
November 27, 2016	23:35	Nepal	27.845	86.525	1	5.4	M_{b} (USGS) Centred 19 km WNW of Namche Bazar, Nepal, at a depth of 10.0 km.	
November 29, 2016	20:09	Poland	51.627	16.157	8	4.3	M_{b} (USGS) Centred 3 km NNW of Grębocice, Poland, at a depth of 5.0 km. All fatalities are underground miners.	
December 1, 2016	22:40	Southern Peru	-15.321	-70.823	1	6.3	M_{w} (USGS) Centred 43 km NE of Huarichancara, Peru, at a depth of 10.0 km.	
December 6, 2016	22:03	Northern Sumatra, Indonesia see 2016 Aceh earthquake	5.281	96.108	104	6.5	M_{w} (USGS) Centred 19 km SE of Sigli, Indonesia, at a depth of 8.2 km.	
December 8, 2016	17:38	Solomon Islands see 2016 Solomon Island earthquake	-10.676	161.330	1	7.8	M_{w} (USGS) Centred 69 km WSW of Kirakira, Solomon Islands, at a depth of 41.0 km.	
December 17, 2016	10:51	New Ireland region, Papua New Guinea	-4.509	153.450	0	7.9	M_{w} (USGS) 46 km east of Taron, Papua New Guinea, at a depth of 103.2 km.	
December 19, 2016	07:11	Near the coast of Ecuador	0.816	-79.740	3	5.4	M_{w} (USGS) 14 km SSW of Propicia, Ecuador, at a depth of 10.0 km.	
December 25, 2016	14:22	Offshore Los Lagos, Chile see 2016 Chiloé earthquake	-43.416	-73.880	0	7.6	M_{w} (USGS) 39 km SSW of Puerto Quellón, Chile, at a depth of 34.6 km.	
December 29, 2016	22:30	Sumbawa region, Indonesia	-9.028	118.664	1	6.3	M_{w} (USGS) Centred 58 km south southeast of Dompu, Indonesia, at a depth of 79.0 km.	

== 2017 ==
Date	Time (UTC)	Place	Lat.	Long.	Fatalities	Magnitude	Comments	Source
January 3, 2017	09:09	India–Bangladesh border region see 2017 Tripura earthquake	24.016	92.006	3	5.5	M_{b} (USGS) Centred 19 km NE of Ambasa, India, at a depth of 36.2 km.	
January 6, 2017	02:33	Southern Iran	28.205	53.116	4	5.3	M_{b} (USGS) Centred 53 km SW of Jahrom, Iran, at a depth of 10.0 km.	
January 10, 2017	06:13	Celebes Sea	4.463	122.575	0	7.3	M_{w} (USGS) Centred 188 km SSE of Tabiauan, Philippines, at a depth of 612.7 km.	
January 18, 2017	10:14	Central Italy see January 2017 Central Italy earthquakes	42.601	13.241	34	5.7	M_{b} (USGS) Centred 5 km WSW of Amatrice, Italy, at a depth of 10.0 km.	
January 22, 2017	04:30	Bougainville region, Papua New Guinea see 2017 Papua New Guinea earthquake	-6.214	155.122	5	7.9	M_{w} (USGS) Centred 41 km WNW of Panguna, Papua New Guinea, at a depth of 136.0 km.	
February 10, 2017	14:03	Mindanao, Philippines see 2017 Surigao earthquake	9.907	125.452	8	6.5	M_{w} (USGS) Centred 10 km north of Mabua, Philippines, at a depth of 15.0 km.	
March 5, 2017	00:08	Mindanao, Philippines	9.831	125.496	1	5.7	M_{w} (USGS) Centred 5 km north of Surigao, Philippines, at a depth of 10.2 km.	
March 13, 2017	14:19	Myanmar	17.415	96.011	2	5.1	M_{b} (USGS) Centred 34 km SE of Tharyarwady, Myanmar, at a depth of 10.0 km.	
April 5, 2017	06:09	Northeastern Iran	35.800	60.436	2	6.1	M_{w} (USGS) Centred 63 km NNW of Torbat–e Jam, Iran, at a depth of 13.0 km.	
April 10, 2017	23:53	El Salvador	13.753	-89.160	1	4.8	M_{b} (USGS) Centred 2 km NNW of Soyapango, El Salvador, at a depth of 10.0 km.	
May 10, 2017	21:58	(China) Tajikistan–Xinjiang border region	37.659	75.253	8	5.4	M_{b} (USGS) Centred 126 km ESE of Murghob, Tajikistan, at a depth of 10.0 km. All fatalities took place in Xinjiang, China.	
May 13, 2017	18:01	Turkmenistan–Iran border region	37.853	57.268	2	5.8	M_{w} (USGS) Centred 42 km north of Bojnurd, Iran, at a depth of 12.5 km. All fatalities took place in Iran.	
May 25, 2017	09:55	Lake Victoria region, Tanzania	-3.054	32.893	1	4.4	M_{b} (USGS) Centred 21 km WSW of Misasi, Tanzania, at a depth of 10.0 km.	
June 12, 2017	12:28	(Greece) Near the coast of western Turkey see 2017 Lesbos earthquake	38.932	26.364	1	6.3	M_{w} (USGS) Centred 4 km south of Plomarion, Greece, at a depth of 10.4 km.	
June 14, 2017	07:29	Guatemala see 2017 Guatemala earthquake	14.982	-91.988	5	6.9	M_{w} (USGS) Centred 5 km NNE of San Pablo, Guatemala, at a depth of 94.0 km.	
June 17, 2017	23:39	Western Greenland, Denmark	71.640	-52.344	4	4.2	M_{s} (USGS) Centred 107 km north of Uummannaq, Greenland, Denmark, at a depth of 0.0 km.	
July 6, 2017	08:03	Leyte, Philippines see 2017 Leyte earthquake	11.114	124.633	4	6.5	M_{w} (USGS) Centred 3 km NNE of Masarayao, Philippines, at a depth of 6.5 km.	
July 17, 2017	23:34	Komandorskiye Ostrova, Russia region see 2017 Komandorski Islands earthquake	54.466	168.822	0	7.7	M_{w} (USGS) Centred 199 km ESE of Nikol'skoye, Russia, at a depth of 11.7 km.	
July 18, 2017	02:05	Near the coast of southern Peru	-16.402	-73.603	1	6.4	M_{w} (USGS) Centred 98 km WNW of Camaná, Peru, at a depth of 44.1 km.	
July 20, 2017	22:31	Dodecanese Islands, Greece see 2017 Aegean Sea earthquake	36.923	27.415	2	6.6	M_{w} (USGS) Centred 11 km ENE of Kos, Greece, at a depth of 7.0 km.	
August 2, 2017	07:15	Region Metropolitana, Chile	-33.209	-70.636	1	5.5	M_{w} (USGS) Centred 25 km ENE of Lampa, Chile, at a depth of 88.2 km.	
August 8, 2017	13:19	Sichuan–Gansu border region, China see 2017 Jiuzhaigou earthquake	33.193	103.855	24	6.5	M_{w} (USGS) Centred 36 km WSW of Yongle, China, at a depth of 9.0 km.	
August 11, 2017	21:45	Near the coast of southern Peru	-16.298	-73.474	1	5.6	M_{w} (USGS) Centred 89 km WNW of Camaná, Peru, at a depth of 41.0 km.	
August 21, 2017	18:57	(Italy) Tyrrhenian Sea see 2017 Ischia earthquake	40.780	13.945	2	4.2	M_{b} (USGS) Centred 4 km north of Ischia, Italy, at a depth of 9.3 km.	
August 22, 2017	22:26	Leyte, Philippines	11.014	124.736	2	5.0	M_{b} (USGS) Centred 8 km NNE of Talisayan, Philippines, at a depth of 10.0 km.	
September 8, 2017	04:49	Offshore Chiapas, Mexico see 2017 Chiapas earthquake	15.022	-93.899	98	8.2	M_{w} (USGS) Centred 101 km SSW of Tres Picos, Mexico, at a depth of 47.4 km.	
September 19, 2017	18:14	Puebla, Mexico see 2017 Central Mexico earthquake	18.584	-98.399	370	7.1	M_{w} (USGS) Centred 5 km ENE of Raboso, Mexico, at a depth of 51.0 km.	
September 23, 2017	12:53	Oaxaca, Mexico	16.737	-94.946	6	6.1	M_{w} (USGS) Centred 18 km SSE of Matías Romero, Mexico, at a depth of 9.0 km.	
October 31, 2017	11:50	Seram, Indonesia	-3.740	127.766	1	6.1	M_{w} (USGS) Centred 39 km WSW of Hila, Indonesia, at a depth of 18.5 km.	
November 12, 2017	18:18	Iran–Iraq border region see 2017 Iran–Iraq earthquake	34.905	45.956	630	7.3	M_{w} (USGS) Centred 30 km south of Halabjah, Iraq, at a depth of 19.0 km. Most damage took place in Iran.	
November 13, 2017	02:28	Costa Rica see 2017 Costa Rica earthquake	9.526	-84.505	3	6.5	M_{w} (USGS) Centred 16 km SE of Jacó, Costa Rica, at a depth of 19.8 km.	
November 18, 2017	16:07	Halmahera, Indonesia	2.382	128.144	1	5.9	M_{w} (USGS) Centred 73 km NNE of Tobelo, Indonesia, at a depth of 20.3 km.	
November 19, 2017	22:43	Loyalty Islands, New Caledonia	-21.334	168.683	0	7.0	M_{w} (USGS) Centred 86 km ENE of Tadine, New Caledonia, at a depth of 10.0 km.	
December 15, 2017	16:47	Java, Indonesia see 2017 Java earthquake	-7.734	108.023	4	6.5	M_{w} (USGS) Centred 0 km ESE of Cipatujah, Indonesia, at a depth of 91.9 km.	
December 20, 2017	19:57	Northern Iran	35.654	50.949	2	4.9	M_{b} (USGS) Centred 2 km WSW of Malard, Iran, at a depth of 10.0 km.	
December 26, 2017	21:24	Northern Iran	35.692	50.900	1	4.0	M_{b} (USGS) Centred 7 km WNW of Malard, Iran, at a depth of 10.0 km.	

== 2018 ==
Date	Time (UTC)	Place	Lat.	Long.	Fatalities	Magnitude	Comments	Source
January 10, 2018	02:51	North of Honduras see 2018 Swan Islands earthquake	17.474	-83.519	0	7.5	M_{w} (USGS) Centred 44 km east of Great Swan Island, Honduras, at a depth of 10.0 km.	
January 14, 2018	09:18	Near the coast of southern Peru see 2018 Peru earthquake	-15.776	-74.744	2	7.1	M_{w} (USGS) Centred 40 km SSW of Acarí, Peru, at a depth of 36.3 km.	
January 23, 2018	06:34	Java, Indonesia see 2018 West Java earthquake	-7.196	105.918	2	6.0	M_{w} (USGS) Centred 40 km south of Binuangeun, Indonesia, at a depth of 43.9 km.	
January 23, 2018	09:31	Gulf of Alaska, United States see 2018 Gulf of Alaska earthquake	56.046	-149.073	0	7.9	M_{w} (USGS) Centred 280 km SE of Kodiak, Alaska, United States, at a depth of 25.0 km.	
January 31, 2018	07:07	Hindu Kush region, Afghanistan	36.543	70.816	2	6.1	M_{w} (USGS) Centred 35 km south of Jarm, Afghanistan, at a depth of 191.2 km. Most damage took place in Pakistan.	
January 31, 2018	23:13	Ecuador	-1.756	-77.694	1	5.2	M_{b} (USGS) Centred 27 km ESE of Palora, Ecuador, at a depth of 18.7 km.	
February 6, 2018	15:50	Taiwan see 2018 Hualien earthquake	24.174	121.653	17	6.4	M_{w} (USGS) Centred 22 km NNE of Hualien, Taiwan, at a depth of 10.6 km.	
February 16, 2018	23:39	Oaxaca, Mexico see 2018 Oaxaca earthquake	16.646	-97.653	14	7.2	M_{w} (USGS) Centred 37 km NE of Pinotepa de Don Luis, Mexico, at a depth of 24.7 km.	
February 25, 2018	17:44	New Guinea, Papua New Guinea see 2018 Papua New Guinea earthquake	-6.149	142.766	160	7.5	M_{w} (USGS) Centred 89 km SSW of Porgera, Papua New Guinea, at a depth of 35.0 km.	
March 4, 2018	19:56	New Guinea, Papua New Guinea	-6.307	142.620	11	6.0	M_{w} (USGS) Centred 112 km SW of Porgera, Papua New Guinea, at a depth of 10.0 km.	
March 6, 2018	14:13	New Guinea, Papua New Guinea	-6.294	142.607	25	6.7	M_{w} (USGS) Centred 112 km SW of Porgera, Papua New Guinea, at a depth of 10.0 km.	
April 7, 2018	05:48	New Guinea, Papua New Guinea	-5.841	142.490	4	6.3	M_{w} (USGS) Centred 88 km WSW of Porgera, Papua New Guinea, at a depth of 10.0 km.	
April 18, 2018	06:28	Java, Indonesia	-7.246	109.622	3	4.6	M_{b} (USGS) Centred 23 km SSE of Buaran, Indonesia, at a depth of 2.4 km.	
June 5, 2018	18:40	Azerbaijan	41.529	46.795	1	5.3	M_{w} (USGS) Centred 11 km WNW of Çinarlı, Azerbaijan, at a depth of 22.6 km.	
June 12, 2018	09:35	Colombia	1.032	-77.259	2	4.9	M_{w} (USGS) Centred 16 km ESE of Tangua, Colombia, at a depth of 10.0 km.	
June 17, 2018	22:58	Near the south coast of western Honshu, Japan see 2018 Osaka earthquake	34.829	135.638	4	5.5	M_{w} (USGS) Centred 2 km NNW of Hirakata, Japan, at a depth of 13.2 km.	
July 21, 2018	07:58	Southern Sumatra, Indonesia	-0.965	100.771	1	5.2	M_{w} (USGS) Centred 8 km south of Sirukam, Indonesia, at a depth of 10.0 km.	
July 28, 2018	22:47	Lombok region, Indonesia see July 2018 Lombok earthquake	-8.274	116.491	20	6.4	M_{w} (USGS) Centred 5 km north of Lelongken, Indonesia, at a depth of 6.4 km.	
August 5, 2018	11:46	Lombok region, Indonesia see 5 August 2018 Lombok earthquake	-8.263	116.439	513	6.9	M_{w} (USGS) Centred 0 km south of Loloan, Indonesia, at a depth of 31.0 km.	
August 9, 2018	05:25	Lombok region, Indonesia	-8.394	116.208	6	5.9	M_{w} (USGS) Centred 3 km SE of Todo, Indonesia, at a depth of 10.0 km.	
August 19, 2018	00:19	Fiji region see 2018 Fiji earthquake	-18.178	-178.111	0	8.2	M_{w} (USGS) Centred 280 km NNE of Ndoi Island, Fiji, at a depth of 563.4 km.	
August 19, 2018	04:10	Lombok region, Indonesia	-8.325	116.577	2	6.3	M_{w} (USGS) Centred 6 km NE of Sembalunlawang, Indonesia, at a depth of 7.9 km.	
August 19, 2018	14:56	Lombok region, Indonesia see 19 August 2018 Lombok earthquake	-8.324	116.626	14	6.9	M_{w} (USGS) Centred 2 km south of Belanting, Indonesia, at a depth of 25.6 km.	
August 21, 2018	21:31	Offshore Sucre, Venezuela see 2018 Venezuela earthquakes	10.855	-62.883	5	7.3	M_{w} (USGS) Centred 30 km NE of Río Caribe, Venezuela, at a depth of 154.3 km.	
August 24, 2018	09:04	Peru–Brazil border region	-11.042	-70.817	0	7.1	M_{w} (USGS) Centred 138 km WNW of Iberia, Peru, at a depth of 609.5 km.	
August 25, 2018	22:13	Western Iran	34.663	46.277	3	6.0	M_{w} (USGS) Centred 26 km SW of Javanrud, Iran, at a depth of 10.0 km.	
August 29, 2018	03:51	Southeast of the Loyalty Islands, New Caledonia	-22.066	170.050	0	7.1	M_{w} (USGS) Centred 209 km west of Île Hunter, New Caledonia, at a depth of 26.7 km.	
September 5, 2018	18:07	Hokkaido, Japan region see 2018 Hokkaido Eastern Iburi earthquake	42.671	141.933	41	6.6	M_{w} (USGS) Centred 27 km east of Tomakomai, Japan, at a depth of 33.4 km.	
September 6, 2018	15:49	Fiji	-18.475	179.345	0	7.9	M_{w} (USGS) Centred 102 km ESE of Suva, Fiji, at a depth of 670.7 km.	
September 7, 2018	06:23	Southeastern Iran	28.342	59.315	1	5.5	M_{b} (USGS) Centred 126 km SE of Bam, Iran, at a depth of 33.4 km.	
September 12, 2018	04:50	Assam, India	26.374	90.165	1	5.3	M_{w} (USGS) Centred 7 km NE of Sapatgram, India, at a depth of 10.0 km.	
September 28, 2018	06:59	Minahasa, Sulawesi, Indonesia	-0.401	119.771	1	6.1	M_{w} (USGS) Centred 55 km NNW of Palu, Indonesia, at a depth of 5.0 km.	
September 28, 2018	10:02	Minahasa, Sulawesi, Indonesia see 2018 Sulawesi earthquake and tsunami	-0.256	119.846	4,340 dead 667 missing	7.5	M_{w} (USGS) Centred 70 km north of Palu, Indonesia, at a depth of 20.0 km.	
October 7, 2018	00:11	Haiti region see 2018 Haiti earthquake	20.041	-72.975	18	5.9	M_{w} (USGS) Centred 19 km NW of Ti Port–de–Paix, Haiti, at a depth of 11.7 km.	
October 10, 2018	18:44	(Indonesia) Bali Sea	-7.456	114.453	4	6.0	M_{w} (USGS) Centred 39 km NNE of Sumberanyar, Indonesia, at a depth of 9.0 km.	
October 10, 2018	20:48	New Britain region, Papua New Guinea	-5.678	151.198	0	7.0	M_{w} (USGS) Centred 117 km east of Kimbe, Papua New Guinea, at a depth of 40.3 km.	
November 14, 2018	23:01	Sulawesi, Indonesia	-2.916	119.435	7	5.6	M_{w} (USGS) Centred 6 km ENE of Mamasa, Indonesia, at a depth of 8.7 km.	
November 25, 2018	16:37	Iran–Iraq border region see 2018 Sarpol–e Zahab earthquake	34.304	45.740	1	6.3	M_{w} (USGS) Centred 20 km SSW of Sarpol–e Zahab, Iran, at a depth of 10.0 km.	
November 30, 2018	17:29	Southern Alaska, United States see 2018 Anchorage earthquake	61.346	-149.955	0	7.1	M_{w} (USGS) Centred 14km NNW of Anchorage, Alaska, United States, at a depth of 46.7km.	
December 5, 2018	04:18	(New Caledonia) Southeast of the Loyalty Islands	-21.969	169.446	0	7.5	M_{w} (USGS) Centred 168 km ESE of Tadine, New Caledonia, at a depth of 10.0 km.	
December 11, 2018	02:26	(South Georgia and the South Sandwich Islands) South Sandwich Islands region	-58.598	-26.466	0	7.1	M_{w} (USGS) Centred 48 km north of Bristol Island, South Sandwich Islands, at a depth of 164.7 km.	
December 20, 2018	17:01	Komandorskiye Ostrova, Russia region	55.100	164.699	0	7.3	M_{w} (USGS) Centred 83 km west of Nikol'skoye, Russia, at a depth of 16.6 km.	
December 29, 2018	03:39	Mindanao, Philippines	5.974	126.828	0	7.0	M_{w} (USGS) Centred 83 km ESE of Pondaguitan, Philippines, at a depth of 60.1 km.	

== 2019 ==
Date	Time (UTC)	Place	Lat.	Long.	Fatalities	Magnitude	Comments	Source
January 12, 2019	08:58	Poland	51.572	16.132	1	3.6	M_{L} (USGS) Centred 3 km SW of Grębocice, Poland, at a depth of 10.0 km. The fatality is an underground miner.	
January 20, 2019	01:32	Near the coast of Coquimbo, Chile	-30.074	-71.423	2	6.7	M_{w} (USGS) Centred 15 km SSW of Coquimbo, Chile, at a depth of 53.0 km.	
January 22, 2019	22:35	Poland	50.108	18.432	1	3.9	M_{b} (USGS) Centred 0 km ESE of Gaszowice, Poland, at a depth of 5.4 km. The fatality is an underground miner.	
January 26, 2019	12:32	Colombia	2.990	-75.769	1	5.6	M_{w} (USGS) Centred 13 km WNW of Santa María, Colombia, at a depth of 10.0 km.	
February 22, 2019	10:17	Peru–Ecuador border region	-2.199	-77.023	1	7.5	M_{w} (USGS) Centred 115 km ESE of Palora, Ecuador, at a depth of 132.4 km.	
February 25, 2019	05:15	Eastern Sichuan, China	29.498	104.632	2	4.9	M_{b} (USGS) Centred 21 km NW of Zigong, China, at a depth of 10.0 km.	
March 1, 2019	08:50	Southern Peru	-14.713	-70.155	1	7.0	M_{w} (USGS) Centred 23 km NNE of Azángaro, Peru, at a depth of 267.0 km.	
March 17, 2019	07:07	Lombok region, Indonesia see 2019 Lombok earthquake	-8.418	116.521	6	5.6	M_{w} (USGS) Centred 18 km WNW of Labuan Lombok, Indonesia, at a depth of 10.0 km.	
March 21, 2019	09:15	Lake Rukwa region, Tanzania	-7.878	32.085	1	5.5	M_{w} (USGS) Centred 52 km east of Sumbawanga, Tanzania, at a depth of 22.0 km.	
April 12, 2019	11:40	Sulawesi, Indonesia	-1.852	122.553	1	6.8	M_{w} (USGS) Centred 102 km SSW of Luwuk, Indonesia, at a depth of 17.5 km.	
April 18, 2019	05:01	Taiwan see 2019 Hualien earthquake	23.989	121.693	1	6.1	M_{w} (USGS) Centred 9 km east of Hualien, Taiwan, at a depth of 20.0 km.	
April 22, 2019	09:11	Luzon, Philippines see 2019 Luzon earthquake	14.924	120.497	18	6.1	M_{w} (USGS) Centred 0 km ESE of Gutad, Philippines, at a depth of 20.0 km.	
May 6, 2019	21:19	Eastern New Guinea region, Papua New Guinea	-6.975	146.449	0	7.1	M_{w} (USGS) Centred 33 km NW of Bulolo, Papua New Guinea, at a depth of 146.0 km.	
May 14, 2019	12:58	New Britain region, Papua New Guinea	-4.081	152.569	0	7.5	M_{w} (USGS) Centred 45 km NE of Kokopo, Papua New Guinea, at a depth of 10.0 km.	
May 26, 2019	07:41	Northern Peru see 2019 Peru earthquake	-5.796	-75.298	2	8.0	M_{w} (USGS) Centred 75 km SSE of Lagunas, Peru, at a depth of 109.9 km.	
May 30, 2019	09:03	El Salvador	13.243	-89.272	1	6.6	M_{w} (USGS) Centred 27 km SSE of La Libertad, El Salvador, at a depth of 65.1 km.	
June 15, 2019	22:55	Kermadec Islands, New Zealand	-30.805	-178.095	0	7.2	M_{w} (USGS) Centred 103 km NE of L'Esperance Rock, New Zealand, at a depth of 34.4 km.	
June 17, 2019	14:55	Eastern Sichuan, China see 2019 Sichuan earthquake	28.405	104.957	13	5.8	M_{w} (USGS) Centred 19 km south of Changning, China, at a depth of 10.0 km.	
June 24, 2019	02:53	(Indonesia) Banda Sea	-6.389	129.220	0	7.3	M_{w} (USGS) Centred 288 km NW of Saumlaki, Indonesia, at a depth of 208.3 km.	
July 4, 2019	17:33	Southern California, United States see 2019 Ridgecrest earthquakes	35.705	-117.506	1	6.4	M_{w} (USGS) Centred 12 km SW of Searles Valley, California, United States, at a depth of 10.7 km.	
July 5, 2019	18:41	Poland	51.517	16.172	1	4.7	M_{b} (USGS) Centred 6 km west of Rudna, Poland, at a depth of 11.2 km. The fatality is an underground miner.	
July 6, 2019	03:19	Southern California, United States see 2019 Ridgecrest earthquakes	35.770	-117.599	0	7.1	M_{w} (USGS) Centred 18 km west of Searles Valley, California, United States, at a depth of 8.0 km.	
July 8, 2019	07:00	Western Iran	31.775	49.542	1	5.7	M_{b} (USGS) Centred 28 km SE of Masjed Soleyman, Iran, at a depth of 10.0 km.	
July 9, 2019	12:37	Mindanao, Philippines	6.802	125.169	1	5.6	M_{w} (USGS) Centred 2 km WSW of Dolo, Philippines, at a depth of 24.0 km.	
July 14, 2019	09:10	Halmahera, Indonesia see 2019 North Maluku earthquake	-0.529	128.093	14	7.3	M_{w} (USGS) Centred 102 km NNE of Laiwui, Indonesia, at a depth of 10.0 km.	
July 26, 2019	23:37	Batan Islands region, Philippines see 2019 Batanes earthquake	20.807	121.986	9	6.0	M_{w} (USGS) Centred 15 km east of Itbayat, Philippines, at a depth of 10.0 km.	
August 2, 2019	12:03	Southwest of Sumatra, Indonesia see 2019 Sunda Strait earthquake	-7.267	104.825	8	6.9	M_{w} (USGS) Centred 102 km WSW of Tugu Hilir, Indonesia, at a depth of 52.8 km.	
August 7, 2019	21:28	Taiwan	24.475	121.947	1	5.9	M_{w} (USGS) Centred 16 km SE of Su'ao, Taiwan, at a depth of 10.0 km.	
September 7, 2019	22:42	Sichuan–Chongqing border region, China	29.573	105.064	1	5.1	M_{w} (USGS) Centred 1 km south of Neijiang, China, at a depth of 10.0 km.	
September 24, 2019	11:01	Pakistan see 2019 Pakistani earthquake	33.106	73.766	40	5.6	M_{b} (USGS) Centred 3 km south of New Mirpur, Pakistan, at a depth of 10.0 km.	
September 25, 2019	23:46	Seram, Indonesia see 2019 Ambon earthquake	-3.450	128.347	41	6.5	M_{w} (USGS) Centred 10 km south of Kairatu, Indonesia, at a depth of 18.2 km.	
September 26, 2019	10:59	Western Turkey see 2019 Istanbul earthquake	40.890	28.173	1	5.7	M_{w} (USGS) Centred 20 km ESE of Marmaraereğlisi, Turkey, at a depth of 10.0 km.	
September 26, 2019	16:36	Southern Chile–Argentina border region	-40.815	-71.999	1	6.1	M_{w} (USGS) Centred 30 km west of Villa La Angostura, Argentina, at a depth of 129.0 km.	
September 29, 2019	15:57	Off the coast of Maule, Chile	-35.473	-73.162	1	6.7	M_{w} (USGS) Centred 69 km WSW of Constitución, Chile, at a depth of 11.0 km.	
October 3, 2019	13:01	Poland	50.210	18.826	1	2.8	M_{L} (USGS) Centred 3 km SE of Paniówki, Poland, at a depth of 5.0 km. The fatality is an underground miner.	
October 6, 2019	05:25	Pakistan	32.891	73.662	1	3.6	M_{b} (USGS) Centred 7 km SW of Jhelum, Pakistan, at a depth of 10.0 km.	
October 10, 2019	04:39	Seram, Indonesia	-3.650	128.216	1	5.0	M_{b} (USGS) Centred 4 km WSW of Passo, Indonesia, at a depth of 54.4 km.	
October 16, 2019	11:37	Mindanao, Philippines see 2019 Cotabato earthquakes	6.712	125.005	7	6.4	M_{w} (USGS) Centred 7 km ENE of Columbio, Philippines, at a depth of 14.1 km.	
October 29, 2019	01:04	Mindanao, Philippines see 2019 Cotabato earthquakes	6.802	125.040	24 dead 3 missing	6.6	M_{w} (USGS) Centred 14 km east of Bual, Philippines, at a depth of 15.3 km.	
October 31, 2019	01:11	Mindanao, Philippines see 2019 Cotabato earthquakes	6.908	125.153	24 dead 3 missing	6.5	M_{w} (USGS) Centred 1 km south of Kisante, Philippines, at a depth of 10.0 km.	
November 7, 2019	22:47	Northwestern Iran see 2019 East Azerbaijan earthquake	37.808	47.558	7	5.9	M_{w} (USGS) Centred 57 km NE of Hashtrud, Iran, at a depth of 10.0 km.	
November 12, 2019	10:10	Seram, Indonesia	-3.610	128.299	2	5.0	M_{b} (USGS) Centred 5 km ENE of Passo, Indonesia, at a depth of 49.8 km.	
November 10, 2019	16:17	Molucca Sea	1.629	126.414	1	7.1	M_{w} (USGS) Centred 138 km east of Bitung, Indonesia, at a depth of 33.0 km.	
November 25, 2019	01:18	China–Vietnam border region	22.960	106.711	1	5.0	M_{w} (USGS) Centred 43 km SE of Xinjing, China, at a depth of 10.0 km.	
November 26, 2019	02:54	Albania see 2019 Albania earthquake	41.521	19.559	52	6.4	M_{w} (USGS) Centred 16 km WSW of Mamurras, Albania, at a depth of 20.0 km.	
December 15, 2019	06:11	Mindanao, Philippines see 2019 Davao del Sur earthquake	6.708	125.188	13	6.8	M_{w} (USGS) Centred 6 km south of Magsaysay, Philippines, at a depth of 22.4 km.	

== 2020 ==
Date	Time (UTC)	Place	Lat.	Long.	Fatalities	Magnitude	Comments	Source
January 7, 2020	08:24	Puerto Rico region see 2020 Puerto Rico earthquakes	17.916	-66.813	3	6.4	M_{w} (USGS) Centred 8km south of Indios, Puerto Rico, United States, at a depth of 10.0km.	
January 10, 2020	22:26	Puerto Rico region see 2020 Puerto Rico earthquakes	17.935	-66.883	1	5.2	M_{L} (USGS) Centred 4 km SSW of Indios, Puerto Rico, United States, at a depth of 9.0 km.	
January 19, 2020	13:27	Southern Xinjiang, China see 2020 Kashgar earthquake	39.831	77.106	1	6.0	M_{w} (USGS) Centred 86 km ENE of Arzak, China, at a depth of 6.3 km.	
January 24, 2020	17:55	Eastern Turkey see 2020 Elazığ earthquake	38.390	39.081	41	6.7	M_{w} (USGS) Centred 9 km NNE of Doğanyol, Turkey, at a depth of 11.9 km.	
January 28, 2020	19:10	Cuba region see 2020 Caribbean earthquake	19.440	-78.755	0	7.7	M_{w} (USGS) Centred 125 km NNW of Lucea, Jamaica, at a depth of 10.0 km.	
February 13, 2020	10:33	Kuril Islands, Russia	45.631	148.929	0	7.0	M_{w} (USGS) Centred 93 km ENE of Kuril'sk, Russia, at a depth of 144.0 km.	
February 23, 2020	05:53	Turkey–Iran border region see 2020 Iran–Turkey earthquakes	38.504	44.405	10	5.7	M_{w} (USGS) Centred 25km SE of Saray, Turkey, at a depth of 6.4km.	
March 22, 2020	05:24	Slovenia–Croatia border region see 2020 Zagreb earthquake	45.897	15.966	1	5.4	M_{w} (USGS) Centred 3km SW of Kašina, Croatia, at a depth of 10.0km.	
March 25, 2020	02:49	East of the Kuril Islands, Russia	48.969	157.691	1	7.5	M_{w} (USGS) Centred 221km SSE of Severo–Kuril'sk, Russia, at a depth of 55.4km.	
May 7, 2020	20:18	Northern Iran	35.745	52.025	2	4.6	M_{b} (USGS) Centred 4km NW of Damavand, Iran, at a depth of 10.0km.	
May 18, 2020	13:48	Sichuan–Yunnan–Guizhou region, China	27.296	103.281	4	5.2	M_{w} (USGS) Centred 26km WNW of Wenping, China, at a depth of 10.0km.	
June 7, 2020	05:27	Near the coast of northern Peru	-9.547	-78.676	1	4.5	M_{b} (USGS) Centred 52km SSW of Chimbote, Peru, at a depth of 57.2km.	
June 14, 2020	14:24	Eastern Turkey	39.376	40.710	1	5.9	M_{w} (USGS) Centred 16km ESE of Yedisu, Turkey, at a depth of 10.0km.	
June 18, 2020	12:49	South of the Kermadec Islands, New Zealand	-33.294	-177.838	0	7.4	M_{w} (USGS) Centred 684.2km NW of Ōpōtiki, Bay of Plenty, New Zealand, at a depth of 10.0km.	
June 23, 2020	15:29	Near the coast of Oaxaca, Mexico see 2020 Oaxaca earthquake	15.916	-95.953	10	7.4	M_{w} (USGS) Centred 13km ESE of Santa María Xadani, Mexico, at a depth of 20.0km.	
July 17, 2020	02:50	Eastern New Guinea region, Papua New Guinea	-7.843	147.766	1	7.0	M_{w} (USGS) Centred 114km NNW of Popondetta, Papua New Guinea, at a depth of 79.8km.	
July 22, 2020	06:12	Alaska Peninsula, United States see July 2020 Alaska Peninsula earthquake	55.030	-158.522	0	7.8	M_{w} (USGS) Centred 105km SSE of Perryville, Alaska, United States, at a depth of 28.0km.	
August 18, 2020	00:03	Samar, Philippines see 2020 Masbate earthquake	12.021	124.123	2	6.6	M_{w} (USGS) Centred 13km east of San Pedro, Philippines, at a depth of 10.0km.	
August 29, 2020	19:01	Northern Iran	36.405	54.399	1	4.0	M_{b} (USGS) Centred 26km north of Damghan, Iran, at a depth of 10.0km.	
October 19, 2020	20:54	South of Alaska, United States see October 2020 Alaska Peninsula earthquake	54.617	-159.635	0	7.6	M_{w} (USGS) Centred 97km SE of Sand Point, Alaska, United States, at a depth of 35.4km.	
October 27, 2020	19:43	Sulawesi, Indonesia	-2.243	119.093	1	5.4	M_{w} (USGS) Centred 53km NNE of Mamuju, Indonesia, at a depth of 22.0km.	
October 30, 2020	11:51	Dodecanese Islands, Greece see 2020 Aegean Sea earthquake	37.918	26.790	119	7.0	M_{w} (USGS) Centred 15km NNE of Néon Karlovásion, Greece, at a depth of 21.0km. Most damage took place in Turkey.	
December 29, 2020	11:19	Croatia region see 2020 Petrinja earthquake	45.422	16.255	7	6.4	M_{w} (USGS) Centred 3km WSW of Petrinja, Croatia, at a depth of 10.0km.	

All times are UTC, unless otherwise stated
ML = Richter magnitude scale
Mw = Moment magnitude
M_{b} = Body wave magnitude
HRV = Harvard University (Global CMT)
USGS = United States Geological Survey

== See also ==
- List of earthquakes 2001–2010
- List of earthquakes 2021–present
