= Ellis Park Stadium disaster =

2001 South African crowd crush

Coordinates: 26°11′51.07″S 28°3′38.76″E

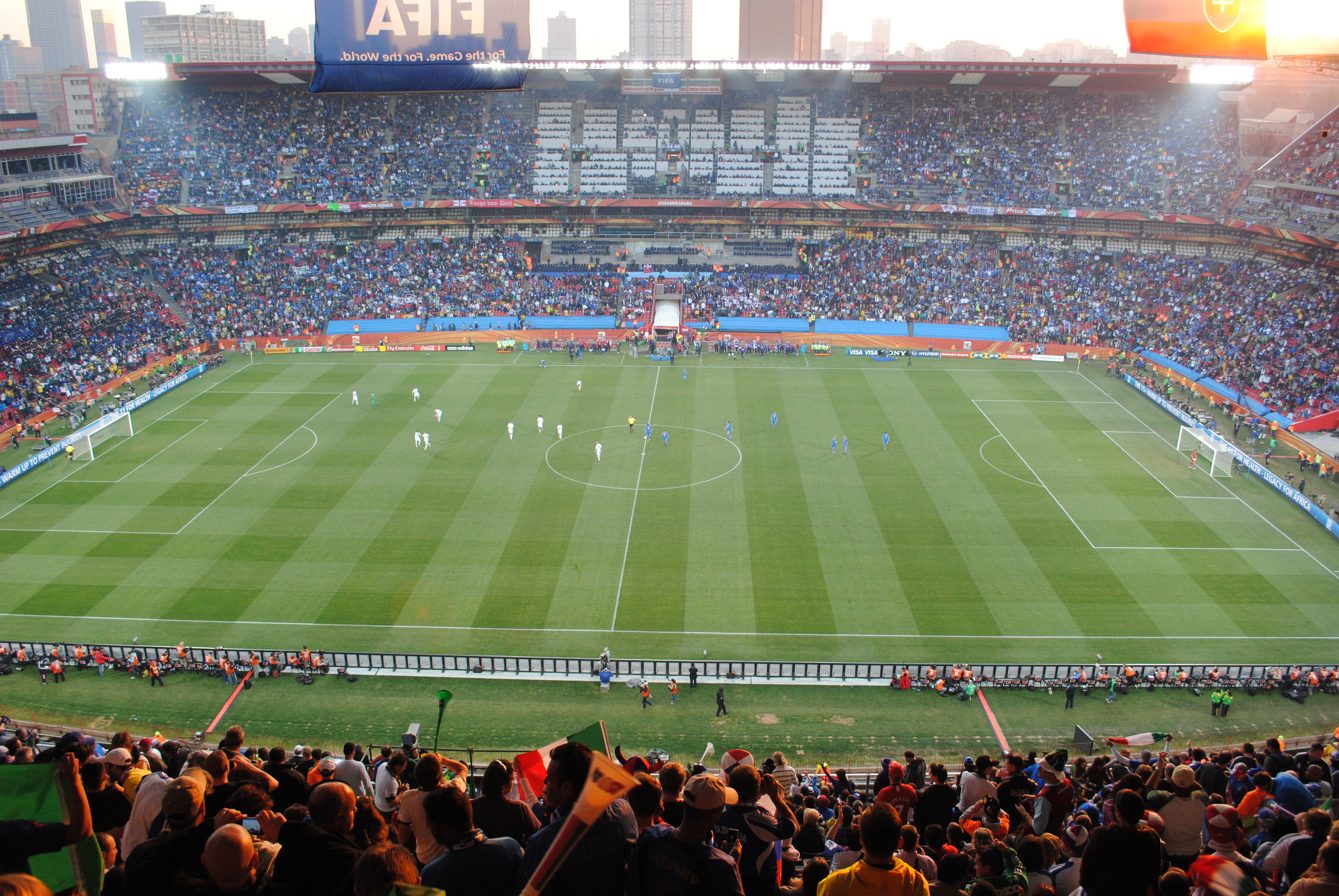
- Ellis Park Stadium, the site of the disaster, seen in 2010
- Date: 11 April 2001
- Location: Johannesburg, Gauteng, South Africa
- Deaths: 43

The Ellis Park Stadium disaster was a crowd crush that occurred on 11 April 2001, claiming the lives of 43 people, surpassing the Oppenheimer Stadium disaster as one of the most severe sporting accidents in South African history. Spectators poured into the Ellis Park Stadium in the city of Johannesburg, Gauteng, South Africa, for the local Soweto derby association football match between Kaizer Chiefs and Orlando Pirates. There was a 60,000-capacity crowd in the stadium, but reports suggest a further 30,000 more fans were trying to gain entry to the stadium. Reports also suggest that 120,000 fans were admitted into the stadium. An Orlando Pirates equaliser sparked a further surge by the fans trying to gain entry as they scrambled to see what had happened. The match was stopped after approximately 34 minutes of play when authorities received a high volume of reported injuries.

== Incident ==
As the crowd surged to gain seats and see the pitch, they overspilled into press boxes, and 43 people were crushed to death. Reportedly inexperienced security guards firing tear gas at the stampeding fans exacerbated the situation, and potentially contributed to some of the deaths. The South African Police Services denied these claims. The final inquiry into the incident concluded that a major cause was security personnel alleged to have taken bribes to admit fans without tickets into the stadium and poor crowd control.

When it became apparent what had happened, the match was halted and the crowd was dispersed. The bodies were laid out on the pitch for identification and medical attention, but none were revived. This was the worst sporting accident in South African history, surpassing the Oppenheimer Stadium disaster in 1991. This was similar to the Ellis Park Stadium disaster as it involved the same two teams. Forty-two people died then in a stampede after a large number of fans were admitted to Oppenheimer Stadium in Orkney, a mining town some 200 kilometres (120 mi) from Johannesburg.
