= List of earthquakes in South Africa =

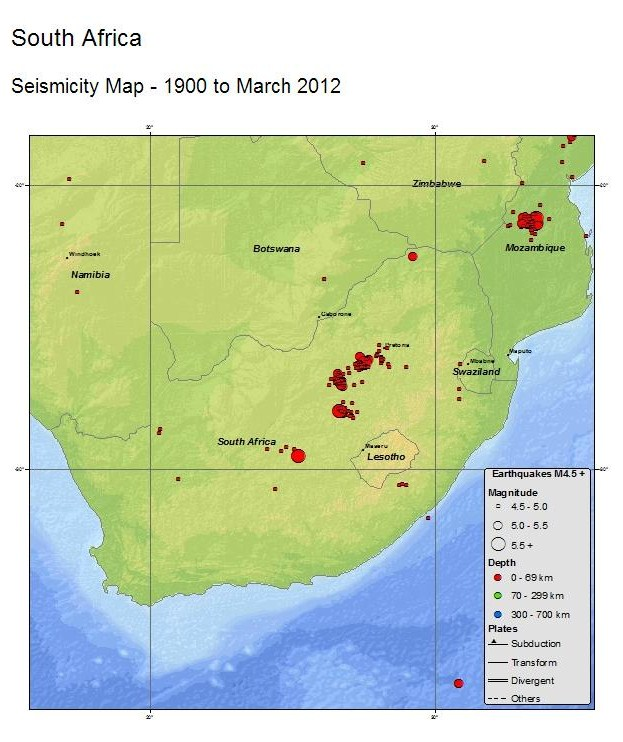
USGS seismicity map for South Africa

The following is a list of notable earthquakes or tremors that have been detected within South Africa.

According to Professor Andrzej Kijko from the University of Pretoria's Natural Hazard Centre, mining can activate natural faults. He believes that 95% of South Africa's earthquakes are caused by mining, especially around the areas of Klerksdorp, Welkom and Carletonville. According to earth science consultant Dr Chris Hartnady, "This part of Africa is in the vicinity of the African Rift system, which is being pulled apart by a few millimetres annually." He says "earthquakes are caused by a slip on a fault line and the release of stored elastic energy" and mining activity can trigger earthquakes.

== Earthquake data ==
For earthquakes prior to the modern era, the magnitude and epicentre location are only approximate, and were calculated based on available reports from the time.

=== 1800s ===
Date	Time (SAST)	Epicentre	Region	$M_L$	$M_w$	Depth	Deaths	Notes
1809-12-04	22:00+	Cape Town	Cape Colony				?	

=== 1900s ===
Date	Time (SAST)	Epicentre	Region	$M_L$	$M_w$	Depth	Deaths	Notes
1912-02-20	15:03:06	28.633°S 27.846°E, 28km N of Maputsoe	Free State		6.1		?	
1919-10-31	17:36:40	27.359°S 30.521°E, 38km S of Driefontein	Transvaal		6.3		?	
1932-12-31	08:30:56	29.313°S 33.117°E, 120 km ESE of Richards Bay	Natal		6.8		?	As of 2025 the strongest earthquake near South Africa since 1900.
1969-09-29	22:03:30	33.268°S 19.386°E, near Tulbagh, 13km NNE of Ceres	Cape Province	6.3	6.3		12	The 1969 Tulbagh earthquake remains the most destructive earthquake in South African history. It was stronger than that of the 1809 Cape Town earthquake which destroyed a local Milnerton farm.
1970-04-14		Tulbagh-Ceres-Wolseley area	Cape Province	5.7				Second quake
1976-12-08		Welkom	Free State	5.2			4	Miners.
1990-09-26		Welkom	Free State	4.2			2	

=== 2000s ===
Date	Time (SAST)	Epicentre	Region	$M_L$	Depth	Deaths	Notes
9 March 2005		Stilfontein,	North West	5.3		2	Miners were killed underground.
28 May 2013		Near Mbabane	Eswatini	4.0			The earthquake was felt in Newcastle and lasted about six seconds.
22 June 2013	07:08	Thabazimbi	Limpopo	3.9	9 km		The earthquake was felt up in the Thabazimbi area.
7 July 2013	16:52	Barberton	Mpumalanga	4.7	5 km		The earthquake was felt in the Barberton area.
11 November 2013		University of Johannesburg, Johannesburg	Gauteng	4.0			The earthquake was felt as far as parts of northern and southern Johannesburg and lasted for around 10–15 seconds.
2 December 2013	21:18	~25 km south of Bela-Bela	Limpopo	4.8	5 km		The earthquake was felt as far as Parkhurst and Randburg in Johannesburg, Hartebeespoort Dam in North West, Witbank and KwaMhlanga in Mpumalanga, and Soshanguve near Pretoria.
15 June 2014	18:16	Near Orkney	North West	4.9	5 km		The earthquake was felt up to Potchefstroom.
5 August 2014	12:22	Near Orkney	North West	5.5	5.0 km		The earthquake was felt as far as parts of Botswana and Durban, it lasted for around 90 sec. The local Council for Geoscience measured the earthquake at 5.5 on the Richter scale, while the United States Geological Survey (USGS) recorded a moment magnitude of 5.4.
22 August 2014	1:14	Near Orange Farm	Gauteng	3.8	10 km		The second earthquake in South Africa in less than three weeks. No reports of injuries. The Council for Geoscience (CGS) in South Africa reported an earthquake of 3.8 with two aftershocks occurring within minutes of each other of 3.2 and 2.0 respectively.
31 October 2019	13:20	Near Port Shepstone	KwaZulu-Natal	4.3	10 km		The CGS reported an earthquake of a preliminary value of 3.7 on the local magnitude scale. However, the USGS has it logged as 4.3
26 September 2020	19:10	1600 km SE of South Africa	Western Cape	6.1	10 km		USGS report. Mistakenly reported to have been felt in Cape Town. See below earthquake.
26 September 2020	20:41	12 km W of Paarl	Western Cape	2.7	5 km		Felt by residents in Cape Town area. CGS report. USGS report.
27 September 2020	09:12	Durbanville Area, Cape Town	Western Cape	2.6	5 km		Felt by residents in Cape Town area. CGS report. USGS report.
17 November 2020	00:27	41 km S of Saldanha	Western Cape	3.5	5 km		Felt by residents in Cape Town area. CGS report. USGS report.
30 July 2021	06:30	Johannesburg	Gauteng	3.6	10 km		Felt by residents in Johannesburg. CGS report. USGS report.
5 November 2022	14:32	23 km from Umvoti Local Municipality	KwaZulu-Natal	4.6	9 km		Felt by residents in Durban area.
11 June 2023	02:38	2 kilometers from Alberton.	Gauteng	5.0	10 km		Felt by residents across the city of Johannesburg and the region as a whole.
22 December 2024	02:51	284 kilometers SW of Upington.	Northern Cape	5.3	10 km		Felt as far away as Namibia and Cape Town. 2 aftershocks: 3.0 and 3.4 $M_L$.

== See also ==
- Geology of South Africa
