= 1960 South African census =

South African census of 1960

1960 National Census
- 6 September 1960

General information
- Country: Union of South Africa

Results
- Total population: 15,994,000 (▲26.2%)
- Most populous region: Transvaal
- Least populous region: Orange Free State

The National Census of 1960 was the 5th comprehensive national census of the Union of South Africa. It undertook to enumerate every person present in South Africa on the census night of 6 September 1960.

== Results ==
=== Demographics ===
==== Population by Race and Province, 1960 ====
Sources: Statesman's Year-Book 1967–1968; Europa Year Book 1969

Province Pop. Group	Cape of Good Hope	Natal	Transvaal	Orange; Free State	Total	Percent
Black	3,011,080	2,199,920	4,633,378	1,083,886	10,928,264	68.3%
White	1,003,207	340,235	1,468,305	276,745	3,088,492	19.3%
Coloured	1,330,089	45,253	108,007	25,909	1,509,258	9.4%
Indian	18,477	394,854	63,787	7	477,125	3.0%
Total	5,362,853	2,980,262	6,273,477	1,386,547	16,003,139	100.0%
% of S. Africa	33.5%	18.6%	39.2%	8.7%	100%	

Population change in South Africa by province
Province	1951 Census	1960 Census	Difference	Percentage difference
Cape of Good Hope	4,227,000	5,360,000	1,133,000	26.80%▲
Natal	2,415,000	2,977,000	562,000	23.27%▲
Transvaal	4,813,000	6,271,000	1,458,000	30.29%▲
Orange Free State	1,017,000	1,366,000	349,000	34.32%▲
Total	12,671,000	15,994,000	3,323,000	26.23%▲

Population change in South Africa by race
Race (census term)	1951 Census	1960 Census	Difference	Percentage difference
Black African (Bantu)	8,560,000	10,928,000	2,368,000	27.66%▲
Coloured	1,103,000	1,509,000	406,000	36.81%▲
Asian or Indian (Asiatic)	367,000	477,000	110,000	29.97%▲
White	2,642,000	3,080,000	438,000	16.58%▲
Total	12,671,000	15,994,000	3,323,000	26.23%▲

=== City rankings ===
Statistics collected during the Apartheid era are regarded as unreliable with regard to measuring African populations. This is because the Native Areas Amendment Bill and the Group Areas Act tended to skew official statistics and underestimate the number of people living in urban areas.

Largest urban areas: total population
City/Town	Province	Population
Johannesburg	Transvaal	1,152,525
Cape Town	Cape of Good Hope	807,211
Durban	Natal	681,492
Pretoria	Transvaal	422,590
Port Elizabeth	Cape of Good Hope	290,693
Germiston	Transvaal	214,393
Bloemfontein	Orange Free State	145,273
Springs	Transvaal	141,943
Benoni	Transvaal	140,790
Pietermaritzburg	Natal	128,598
East London	Cape of Good Hope	116,056
Welkom	Orange Free State	97,614
Roodepoort	Transvaal	95,211
Krugersdorp	Transvaal	89,947
Kimberley	Cape of Good Hope	79,031
Vereeniging	Transvaal	78,835
Brakpan	Transvaal	77,777
Boksburg	Transvaal	71,029
Carletonville	Transvaal	56,246
Uitenhage	Cape of Good Hope	48,755
Klerksdorp	Transvaal	43,726
Kroonstad	Orange Free State	42,438
Potchefstroom	Transvaal	41,927
Paarl	Cape of Good Hope	41,540
Randfontein	Transvaal	41,499
Vanderbijlpark	Transvaal	41,415
Virginia	Orange Free State	40,359
Nigel	Transvaal	34,008
Queenstown	Cape of Good Hope	33,182
Grahamstown	Cape of Good Hope	32,611
Worcester	Cape of Good Hope	32,274
Pietersburg	Transvaal	28,071
Westonaria	Transvaal	26,640
Witbank	Transvaal	25,881
Bethlehem	Orange Free State	24,125
Ladysmith	Natal	22,955
Orkney	Cape of Good Hope	22,425
Stellenbosch	Cape of Good Hope	22,955
Oudtshoorn	Cape of Good Hope	22,229
Odendaalsrus	Orange Free State	21,268
Rustenburg	Cape of Good Hope	21,016
Upington	Cape of Good Hope	20,366

== See also ==
- South African National Census of 2001
- Demographics of South Africa
