= Oppenheimer Stadium disaster =

1991 crowd crush in South Africa

Coordinates: 26.946°S 26.711°E

The Oppenheimer Stadium disaster, or Orkney Disaster, was a crowd crush that occurred on 13 January 1991, in which 42 people died, at the Oppenheimer Stadium in the city of Orkney (200 kilometres (120 mi) from Johannesburg) in South Africa's North West province. It was the second-worst sporting incident in South African history.

On 13 January 1991, there was a preseason friendly association football match between Kaizer Chiefs and Orlando Pirates F.C. The stadium had a capacity of 23,000, but approximately 30,000 spectators were admitted and were not segregated by team affiliation. The referee upheld a goal scored by Chiefs, and supporters of Pirates objected. Pirates fans threw cans and fruit at Chiefs fans. There were reports that some individuals were armed with knives and attacked opposing supporters. Spectators attempting to leave the disturbances were trampled or fatally crushed against perimeter fencing.

The worst sporting incident in South Africa, the Ellis Park Stadium disaster in 2001, involved fans of the same two teams.
