= 2014 Orkney earthquake =

Magnitude 5.5 earthquake near Orkney, Klerksdorp, South Africa

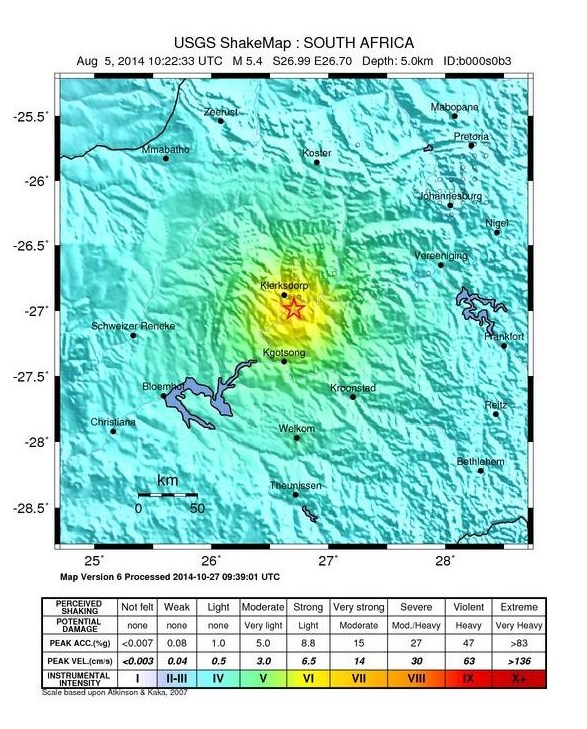
- USGS ShakeMap illustrating the intensity of the earthquake

- Location within South Africa
- UTC time: 2014-08-05 10:22:33
- ISC event: 610571677
- USGS-ANSS: ComCat
- Local date: 5 August 2014
- Local time: 12:22:33 SAST (UTC+02:00)
- Magnitude: 5.5 M_{L}
- Depth: 5.0 km (3.1 mi)
- Epicenter: 26.9717°S 26.7094°E
- Areas affected: South Africa, also felt in Botswana, Swaziland, Lesotho and Mozambique
- Max. intensity: MMI VI (Strong)
- Foreshocks: 4.9 M_{W} at 16:16:25 SAST on 15 June 2014
- Aftershocks: 3.8 M_{L} at 16:58:42 SAST on 5 August 2014
- Casualties: 1 dead 34 injured

The 2014 Orkney earthquake occurred at 12:22:33 SAST on 5 August, with the epicentre near Orkney, a gold mining town in the Klerksdorp district in the North West province of South Africa. The shock was assigned a magnitude of 5.5 on the Richter scale by the Council for Geoscience (CGS) in South Africa, making it the biggest earthquake in South Africa since the 1969 Tulbagh earthquake, which had a magnitude of 6.3 on the Richter scale. The United States Geological Survey (USGS) estimated a focal depth of 5.0 km (3.1 mi). The CGS reported 84 aftershocks on 5 August and 31 aftershocks on 6 August, with a magnitude of 1.0 to 3.8 on the Richter scale. According to the CGS, the earthquake is the biggest mining-related earthquake in South African history.

== Cause ==
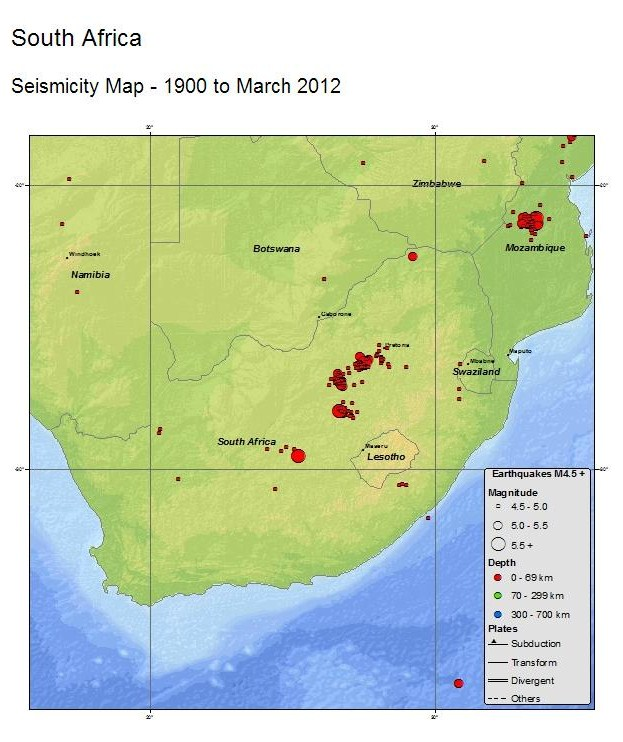
USGS seismicity map for South Africa

=== Historical seismicity ===
While earthquakes are uncommon in South Africa in general, the earthquake occurred in a mining belt where earthquakes are relatively common. The CGS had described a 2005 earthquake with a magnitude of 5.3 on the Richter scale in the same area as Orkney as "the largest mining-related earthquake in South Africa". The earthquake occurred on 9 March 2005 at DRDGOLD's Hartebeesfontein mine in Stilfontein, killing two miners underground and resulting in the closure of the mine. An investigation by the mining regulator following the incident found that it was caused by mining and further seismic events would occur while mining continued. The report on the investigation recommended improvements in seismic monitoring among other things, and some of the recommendations had been implemented before the 2014 earthquake. The USGS recorded a 4.9 moment magnitude earthquake on 15 June 2014 in the same area, which earth science consultant Dr Chris Hartnady believes may have been a foreshock.

=== Expert opinions ===
While both mining activity and natural faults could be causative factors, it is difficult to establish a precise cause. According to Professor Andrzej Kijko from the University of Pretoria's Natural Hazard Centre, mining can activate natural faults. He believes that more than 90% of South Africa's earthquakes are caused by mining, especially around the areas of Klerksdorp, Carletonville and Welkom. According to Hartnady, "This part of Africa is in the vicinity of the East African Rift system, which is being pulled apart by a few millimetres annually." He says "earthquakes are caused by a slip on a fault line and the release of stored elastic energy" and mining activity could have triggered the earthquake. Kijko and Hartnady believe that – unlike the 1969 Tulbagh earthquake – this event was a mining-related earthquake which is a relatively more common occurrence than a natural earthquake in South Africa. Professor Ray Durrheim, a seismologist at Wits University, said seismic events will continue while there is mining activity in the area, and even long afterwards. He said the flooding of inactive mines could also compound pressure on geological faults, triggering further seismic events. According to Durrheim, the link between mining and earthquakes lies "on a continuum, from where it's purely induced by mining activities to where you are triggering a natural earthquake".

=== Council for Geoscience ===
According to Michelle Grobbelaar from the CGS, "There's a rule of thumb that if you experience an earthquake with a certain magnitude in the past, you can always expect an earthquake of a similar magnitude in that same area." Grobbelaar and Denver Birch, also from the CGS, said that the cause of the earthquake was difficult to determine given that it occurred in a mining area and the lack of historical seismic data for the area. Ian Saunders from the CGS confirmed that a team would be sent to the area for further investigation, and Eldridge Kgaswane from the CGS said they should be able to determine the cause within a month. According to Kgaswane, "The fact that the deepest mine shafts are shallower than the epicentre doesn't mean mining can be ruled out as a cause. Blasting in the vicinity of a big fault could have activated seismic activity." On 18 August 2014 at a Council for Scientific and Industrial Research (CSIR) seminar in Pretoria, the CGS confirmed that the earthquake was caused by mining-related activity, making it the biggest ever mining-related earthquake recorded in South Africa.

== Impact ==
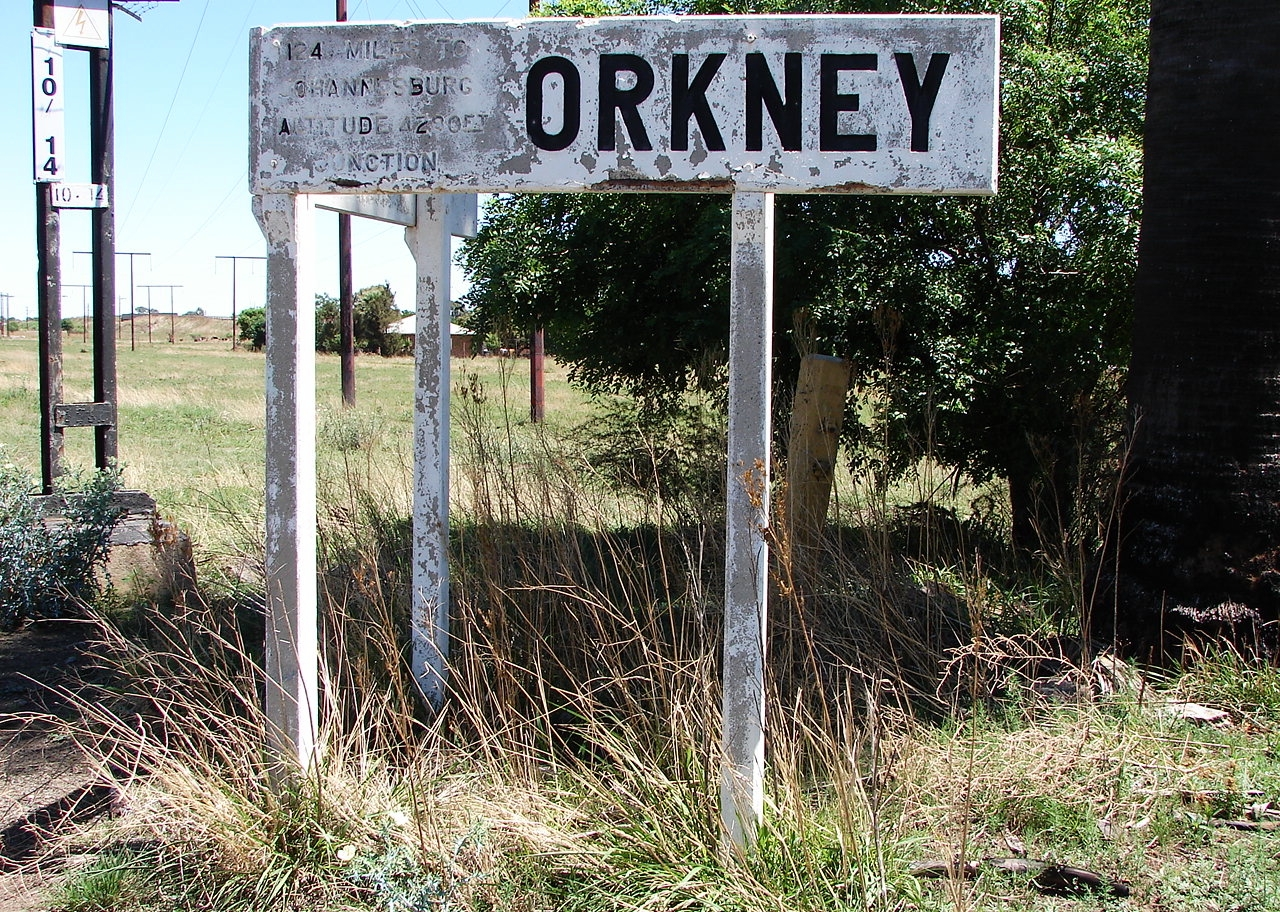
Orkney, North West

The earthquake occurred at 12:22:33 SAST on 5 August 2014, with the epicentre near Orkney, a gold mining town in the Klerksdorp district in the North West province of South Africa. The shock was assigned a magnitude of 5.5 on the Richter scale by the Council for Geoscience (CGS) in South Africa, making it the biggest earthquake in South Africa since the 1969 Tulbagh earthquake, which had a magnitude of 6.3 on the Richter scale. The United States Geological Survey (USGS) estimated a focal depth of 5.0 km (3.1 mi). The CGS reported 84 aftershocks on 5 August and 31 aftershocks on 6 August, with a magnitude of 1.0 to 3.8 on the Richter scale.

=== Areas affected ===
The earthquake was felt as far as 600 km (370 mi) from Orkney. It was felt in neighbouring countries Botswana, Swaziland, Lesotho and Mozambique. The two tallest buildings in Bloemfontein, the former CR Swart Building and the Lebohang building, as well as tall buildings and University of Pretoria halls in Pretoria and offices of the South African Revenue Service in Durban were evacuated. According to Michelle Grobbelaar, manager of the CGS's seismology unit, the earthquake was felt in Durban because "the beach sand tends to amplify the ground motion". Buildings in Maputo in Mozambique were also evacuated. The Meteorological Services of Zimbabwe confirmed that Zimbabwe was not affected by the earthquake.

=== Casualties ===
There was a single fatality, 31-year-old Mosotho man Leshomo Makhaola, who died when a wall of an old mining house collapsed on him in Kanana, North West. An ER24 spokesperson said that miners had reportedly been trapped in 11 mine shafts at a mine in Orkney; however, subsequent inspections revealed that the miners at that location were safe. All 3,300 AngloGold Ashanti miners underground at its Great Noligwa and Moab Khotsong mines near Orkney had been brought to the surface by 19:30 SAST on 5 August, including 34 who had been injured. All 34 miners were treated for minor injuries, including lacerations, contusions and a broken leg, and discharged from hospital on 6 August. AngloGold Ashanti management had proceeded with the evacuation after their temporarily interrupted power supply was mostly restored, mine management had contacted the mine crew underground by telephone and mine engineers had ensured that the shaft infrastructure was in working order. AngloGold Ashanti emergency medical staff had treated injured miners, and counsellors had treated some employees for shock. Mining operations at their Great Noligwa and Moab Khotsong mines were subsequently suspended pending safety checks.

=== Damage ===
There was extensive damage to buildings in Orkney and the surrounding areas, partly due to inadequate building construction vulnerable to earthquake damage. The Khuma township near Stilfontein was one of the worst affected areas, with more than 600 homes damaged by the earthquake. An aftershock occurred in Khuma in the afternoon of 5 August while residents were assessing the damage to their homes. Three clinics in the North West province were damaged, leading to the closure of two of them. Two schools were damaged and some pupils were unable to attend classes as the classrooms were too badly damaged.

In the days following the earthquake, most of South Africa's major banks and insurance companies had begun receiving insurance claims. By 6 August 2014, ABSA had received 200 claims, Standard Bank had received 129 claims and Mutual & Federal had received 11 claims. A survey of 17 insurance companies done by finance website Justmoney showed that 5 out of the 17 companies surveyed would reject insurance claims related to the earthquake if it was proven to be mining-related. In a response to the Survey, ABSA, who was on the list of 5, affirmed that they have received approximately 1100 claims and were in the process of finalising them.

== Response ==
The CGS warned that aftershocks were expected in the days following the earthquake and they could possibly continue for months. They recommended that buildings be evacuated in the event of an aftershock. The mining regulator's chief inspector of mines David Msiza asked mining companies in affected areas, including Klerksdorp, Carletonville and Rustenburg, to undertake underground inspections to ensure no miners were trapped and the working conditions were safe for miners. AngloGold Ashanti denied responsibility for the earthquake, saying it occurred away from its mining infrastructure.

Premier of North West Supra Mahumapelo promised residents that all who were affected by the earthquake would receive help. Mahumapelo said that counselling, social relief and temporary accommodation were being provided, and that the buildings and infrastructure damaged in the earthquake might take years to repair. The North West provincial government started the North West Disaster Relief Fund to help residents affected by the earthquake. Teams were sent to investigate damage to parts of the Dr Kenneth Kaunda District Municipality by the municipality. The Cabinet of South Africa sent its condolences to the family of the man who was killed by the earthquake.

On 30 September 2014, the Inkatha Freedom Party expressed its concern for the residents of Khuma as repairs to their homes were delayed and had not yet commenced. Provincial government spokesperson, Bonolo Mohlakoana said that construction was delayed partly due to a lack of structural engineers, which were needed to assess the structural damage caused to the houses. Several families affected by the earthquake moved to a community centre while waiting for their houses to be repaired after affected families were instructed to move to safer locations.

== See also ==
- List of earthquakes in 2014
- List of earthquakes in South Africa
