= 1969 Tulbagh earthquake =

Earthquake in South Africa

- Location within South Africa
- UTC time: 1969-09-29 20:03:30
- ISC event: 805003
- USGS-ANSS: ComCat
- Local date: 29 September 1969
- Local time: 22:03 SAST
- Magnitude: 6.3 M_{w}
- Depth: 15 km (9 mi)
- Epicenter: 33.268°S 19.386°E
- Type: Strike-slip
- Max. intensity: MMI VIII (Severe)
- Landslides: Many rockslides
- Casualties: 12 dead

The 1969 Tulbagh earthquake occurred at 20:03:33 UTC on 29 September. It had a magnitude of 6.3 M_{w} and a maximum felt intensity of VIII (Severe) on the Modified Mercalli intensity scale. It caused widespread damage in the towns of Ceres, Tulbagh and Wolseley and led to 12 deaths. The earthquake was a result of strike-slip faulting along a NW-SE trending near vertical fault plane, as shown by the focal mechanism and the distribution of aftershocks.

== Tectonic setting ==
The Western Cape lies on the Cape Fold Belt, which is characterised by many thrust faults. Some of these thrust faults were reactivated during Cretaceous rifting as extensional faults, such as the Worcester Fault, which comes to the surface close to the epicentral area, but does not appear to be active.

== Earthquake ==
The earthquake was estimated to have a magnitude of 6.3 M_{L}. The ISC-GEM catalogue records it as 6.3 M_{w}. The focal mechanism shows that the earthquake was a result of strike-slip faulting, either sinistral movement on a NW-SE trending fault or dextral movement on a NE-SW trending fault. As the zone of aftershocks was elongated in a NW-SE direction, the NW-SE plane is regarded as the fault responsible. There is no evidence of a surface fault trace and it has not been possible to tie the earthquake to movement on a known fault structure. However, faults of similar orientation are known from nearby areas.

=== Aftershocks ===
The main-shock was followed by a long series of aftershocks. The largest aftershock occurred nearly six months later on April 14, 1970, and had a magnitude of 5.7 M_{w}.

== Damage ==
Damage was particularly severe in the towns of Ceres, Tulbagh, Wolseley and Prince Alfred Hamlet. There was also significant damage in Porterville and Worcester and the villages of Gouda, Saron and Hermon.

The earthquake severely affected Church Street in Tulbagh, which was renowned for its 18th to 20th-century buildings in Cape Dutch, Victorian and Edwardian styles.

== Aftermath ==
The buildings in Church Street were restored, initially by the National Committee for the Restoration of Historic Buildings in Tulbagh and its Environment, and later by the Tulbagh Valley Heritage Foundation.

== See also ==
- List of earthquakes in 1969
- List of earthquakes in South Africa
