= Ono-i-Lau =

Island group in Fiji

Coordinates: 20°39′S 178°44′W

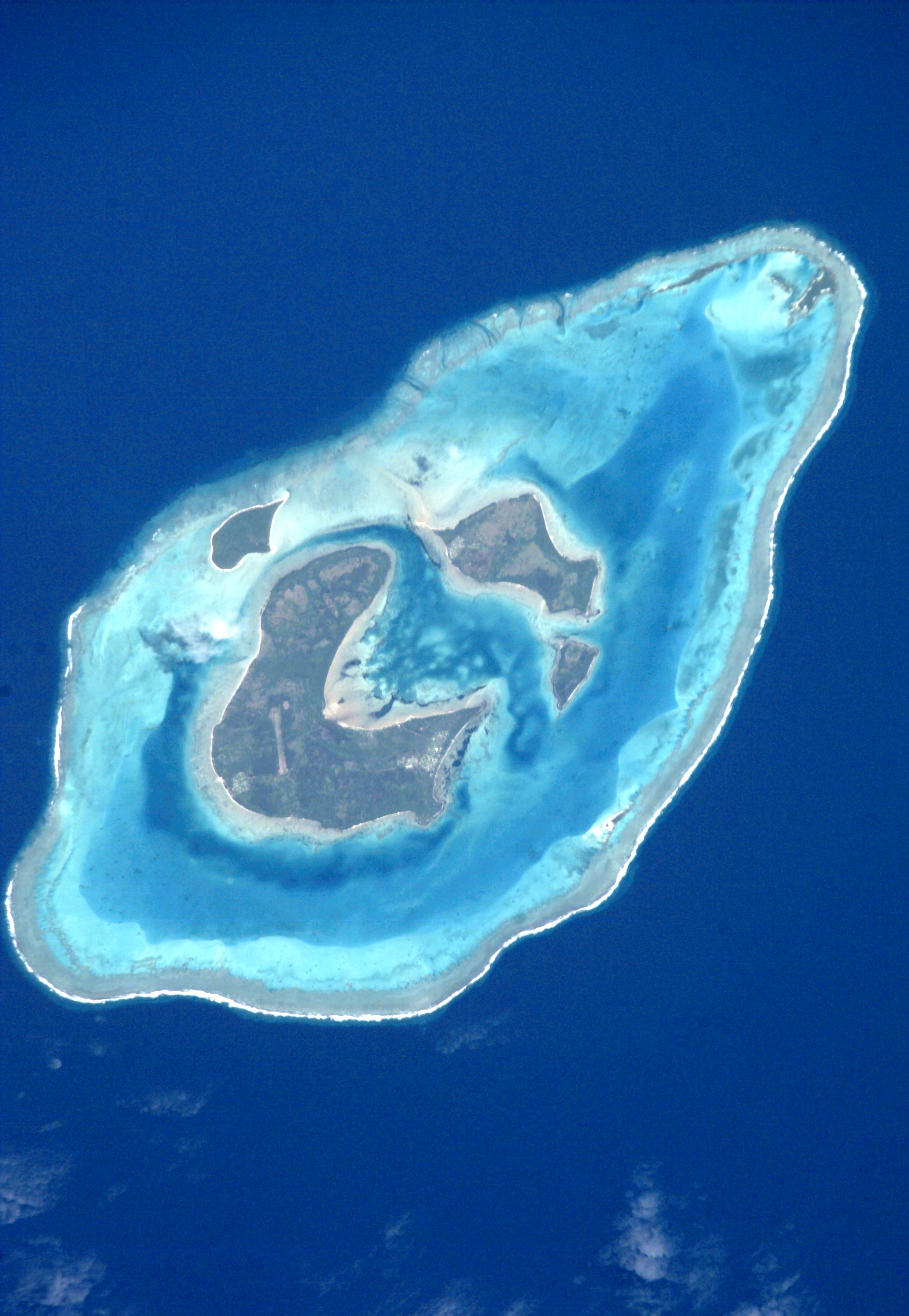
- NASA picture of Ono-i-Lau

- Location within Fiji

Geography
- Location: Koro Sea; South Pacific Ocean
- Archipelago: Southern Lau Islands
- Highest elevation: 113 m (371 ft)

Administration
- Fiji
- Division: Eastern Division
- Province: Lau
- District: Ono
- Area covered: 7.9 km^{2} (3.1 sq mi)

Demographics
- Population: 524 (2017)

Ono-i-Lau is a group of islands within a barrier reef system in the Fijian archipelago of Lau Islands (ono means "six" in the Fijian language). There are four central volcanic islands: Onolevu, Doi (or Ndoi) Lovoni and Ndavura, the uppermost parts of the volcanic edifice rising from the Lau Ridge slightly more than 1,000 metres (3,300 feet) below sea level and on which the reef and other islands are built. There are also three clusters of coral limestone islets, Yanuya (50 islets) and Mana (46 islets) on the barrier reef and Niuta (7 tiny islets). A sand cay, Udui, is not counted as one of the six “islands”.

The group forms one of the southernmost of the Lau Islands; it is located at 20.80° South and 178.75° West, and occupies an area of 7.9 square kilometres (3.1 square miles). It has a maximum elevation of 113 metres (371 feet). It is 90 kilometres (56 mi) south-southwest of Vatoa, the nearest largish island; the only land further south in the Lau Group is in the two small Tuvana islands of coral limestone and sand.

There are four villages in the group – Nukuni and Lovoni adjacent and Matokana on Onolevu, the largest island, and Doi on Doi.

== History ==
The group was the location of the first recorded communication between Fijians and Europeans – Captain William Oliver and men of the Matavy, tender to HMS Pandora, in June 1791.

== Climate ==
Climate data for Ono-i-Lau (1991–2020 normals)
Month	Jan	Feb	Mar	Apr	May	Jun	Jul	Aug	Sep	Oct	Nov	Dec	Year
Mean daily maximum °C (°F)	30.0 (86.0)	30.5 (86.9)	30.1 (86.2)	28.9 (84.0)	27.4 (81.3)	26.1 (79.0)	25.3 (77.5)	25.3 (77.5)	25.9 (78.6)	27.0 (80.6)	28.3 (82.9)	29.5 (85.1)	27.9 (82.2)
Mean daily minimum °C (°F)	24.1 (75.4)	24.5 (76.1)	24.4 (75.9)	23.6 (74.5)	22.0 (71.6)	21.0 (69.8)	20.0 (68.0)	20.0 (68.0)	20.3 (68.5)	21.3 (70.3)	22.5 (72.5)	23.6 (74.5)	22.3 (72.1)
Average precipitation days (≥ 0.1 mm)	11.6	11.2	13.4	11.2	9.2	9.5	7.2	8.2	8.3	6.5	7.0	9.5	112.8
Source: World Meteorological Organization
