= 2012 Yangzhou earthquake =

Earthquake in China

- Location within China
- UTC time: 2012-07-20 12:11:52
- ISC event: 601453276
- USGS-ANSS: ComCat
- Local date: 20 July 2012
- Local time: 20:11:52 CST
- Magnitude: 4.9 mb
- Depth: 13.9 kilometres (8.6 mi)American sources or 5 kilometres (3.1 mi)Chinese sources
- Epicenter: 32.990°N 119.645°E
- Areas affected: China
- Casualties: 1 dead, 2 injured

The 2012 Yangzhou earthquake occurred in Jiangsu Province of the People's Republic of China at 20:11 (UTC+8) in Yangzhou on July 20.

== Location ==
The epicenter was located at the boundary of Baoying County and Gaoyou City, both of which under the jurisdiction of Yangzhou. The earthquake could be felt in a number of nearby cities including Changzhou, Xuzhou, Zhenjiang and Nanjing, the capital of Jiangsu Province.

== Damage ==
The quake measured 4.9 on the body wave magnitude scale. According to official sources, one person died and two were injured as a result of the earthquake. Thirteen rooms collapsed and 155 rooms were severely damaged.
