= Belanting =

- Village
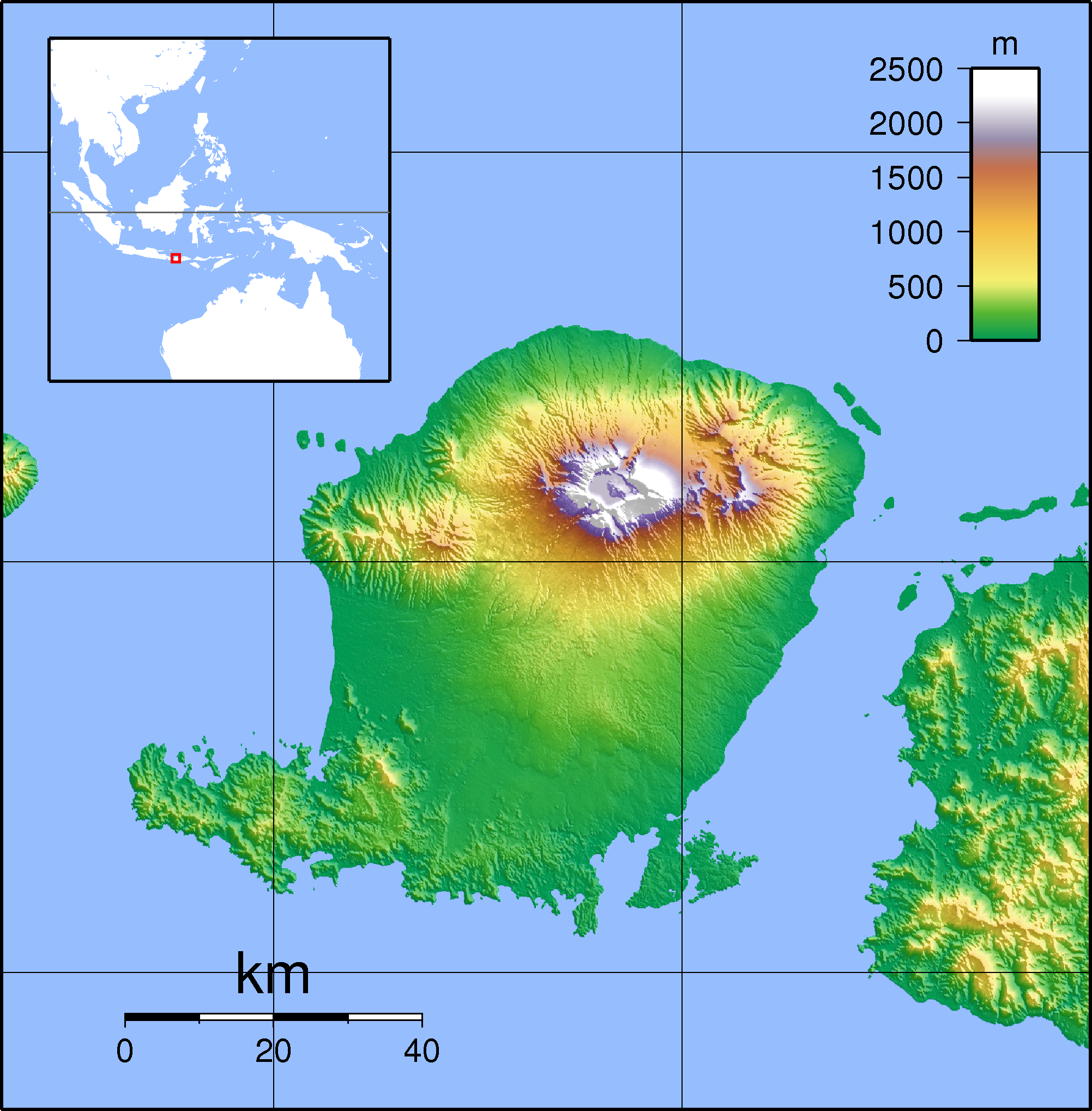
- Location in Indonesia Belanting (Indonesia)
- Coordinates: 8°17′47″S 116°38′10″E
- Country: Indonesia
- Region: Lesser Sunda Islands
- Province: West Nusa Tenggara
- Regency: East Lombok Regency
- Kecamatan: Sambelia

Population (2010)
  - Total: 6,610
- Time zone: UTC+08

Belanting is a village in northeastern Lombok, Indonesia. It lies along the main road around the island, southeast of Obel Obel and northwest of Sambelia. It belongs administratively to the kecamatan of Sambelia in East Lombok Regency, West Nusa Tenggara. As of 2010, the village had a population of 6610 people. The islands of Sulat Island (Gili Sulat) and Lawang Island (Gili Lawang) of the Sungian Strait just off the coast can be viewed from the village.

== Ghost of Raden Gagar ==
A Balinese named Raden Gagar died and was buried in Belanting and was believed to haunt the village. In order to deal with the supernatural problems the villagers were reportedly encountering, a few of his bones and skull were later unearthed and wrapped in a white cloth and taken to Bayan and he given a formal funeral, which was believed to free the area of its ghosts. However, during the "cleaning ceremony" (pengasuh gubug) a series of unfortunate events occurred which were blamed on upsetting his spirit during the reburial process.
