= 2017 Costa Rica earthquake =

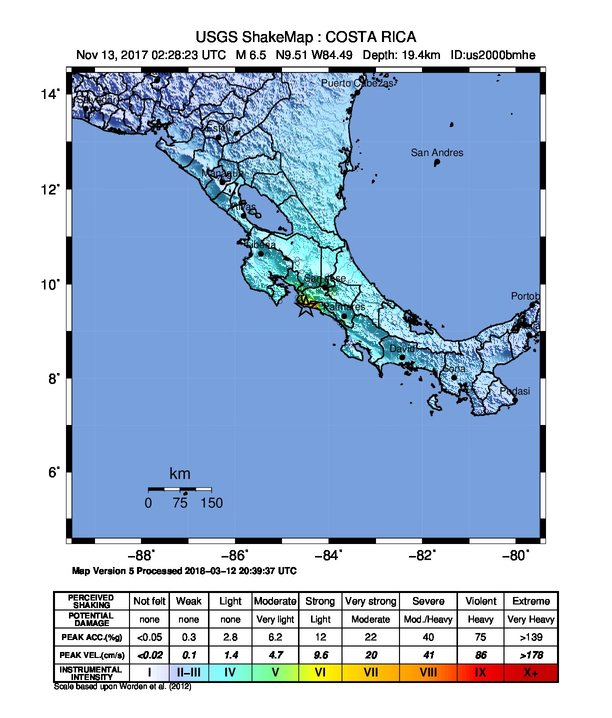

- Location within Costa Rica
- UTC time: 2017-11-13 02:28:23
- ISC event: 616640579
- USGS-ANSS: ComCat
- Local date: November 12, 2017
- Local time: 20:28:24
- Magnitude: 6.5 M_{ww}
- Depth: 19.8 km (12 mi)
- Epicenter: 9.526°N 84.505°W
- Max. intensity: MMI VIII (Severe)
- Casualties: 3 dead

On 12 November 2017 an earthquake with a moment magnitude of 6.5 occurred near Jacó, Costa Rica. It was also felt in parts of Nicaragua and Panama and was followed by more than 20 aftershocks. The earthquake led to three deaths by heart attack and at least two serious injuries.

== Earthquake ==
The earthquake occurred 16 kilometres southeast of Jacó, which is about 100 kilometres southwest of the capital, San Jose on November 12, 2017. At first, the quake was measured at a magnitude of 6.8, it was a magnitude 6.5 earthquake with a maximum intensity of VIII (Severe) on the Mercalli intensity scale. The quake was felt most severely in the provincial districts of Quepos, Parrita and Garabito—of which Jacó is capital. Also, it was followed by more than 20 aftershocks throughout the night, the first measuring 5.1 just four minutes after the first quake.

== Damage ==
Electricity was knocked out in some areas. There was no major infrastructure damage from the tremor that hit the lightly populated area. At least one building in Jacó had been evacuated due to apparent damage and there were reports of walls collapsing and objects falling in other parts of the country. South Jacó had lost power lines and there were downed poles but power was swiftly restored. There were landslides due to the quake that had caused a blockage on the highway from Jacó to other cities. The Mall San Pedro in San José suffered cracking to its walls and floor.

The earthquake, which was felt throughout Costa Rica, and in parts of Nicaragua and Panama, killed at least 3 people. The deaths were all by heart attack; a man and a woman died in Jacó and another man died in Coronado. At least two people were seriously injured by the earthquake. Costa Rica's hospitals continued to function normally and national emergency response agencies were activated. There was no tsumani warning deemed necessary as a result of the earthquake.
