= Oppenheimer Stadium =

Stadium in Orkney, South Africa

- Interactive map of Oppenheimer Stadium
- Coordinates: 26.947°S 26.711°E
- Capacity: 40,000

Oppenheimer Stadium is a football (soccer) stadium in Orkney, South Africa. It initially had a capacity of 23,000, but this increased to 40,000 during the 2010 FIFA World Cup.

The existing earth embankments around the stadium were enlarged by creating a new reinforced concrete structure at the rear and building upwards.

The size of the arena was further increased by the removal of the athletics track, enabling in front of the first row of seats and creating girth for further rows to be installed.

Then, the existing roof of the main stand were removed and replaced by a new roof covering the extended main stand.

It was named after Harry Oppenheimer, son of Ernest Oppenheimer and former chairman of De Beers.

On 13 January 1991, during a pre-season "friendly" football match between Kaizer Chiefs and Orlando Pirates, there was a stampede with 42 deaths, the Oppenheimer Stadium Disaster, the second worst sporting incident in South Africa.

The stadium has since been vandalized and is in no condition to hold any sporting event.
