= Orkney, South Africa =

Town in North West, South Africa

Orkney
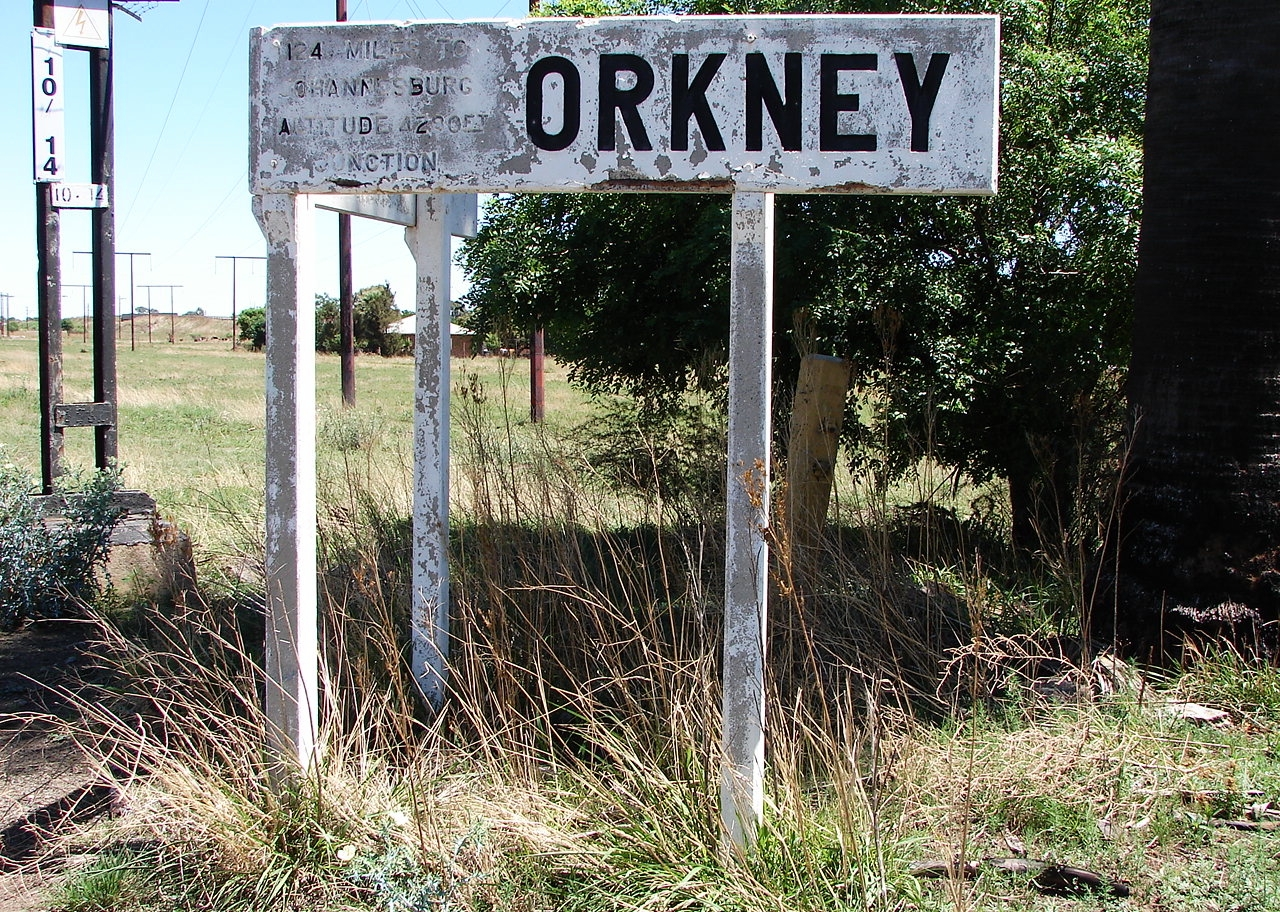
- Deteriorated sign at Orkney railway station

- Location within North West (South African province) Location within South Africa Location within Africa
- Coordinates: 26°58′44″S 26°40′09″E
- Country: South Africa
- Province: North West
- District: Dr Kenneth Kaunda
- Municipality: City of Matlosana

Area
  - Total: 16.43 km^{2} (6.34 sq mi)

Population (2011)
  - Total: 13,435
  - Density: 817.7/km^{2} (2,118/sq mi)

Racial makeup (2011)
  - Black African: 46.8%
  - Coloured: 1.5%
  - Indian/Asian: 0.2%
  - White: 51.0%
  - Other: 0.4%

First languages (2011)
  - Tswana: 51.3%
  - Afrikaans: 14.8%
  - Sotho: 10.4%
  - Xhosa: 8.9%
  - Other: 14.7%
- Time zone: UTC+2 (SAST)
- Postal code (street): 2620
- PO box: 2619
- Area code: 018

Orkney is a gold mining town situated in the Klerksdorp district of the North West province, South Africa. It lies on the banks of the Vaal River approximately 180 km from Johannesburg near the N12 (national road from Johannesburg to George).

== History ==
The town was named after the Orkney Isles off the north coast of Scotland, the birthplace of Simon Fraser, one of the gold mining pioneers of the 1880s. The town was proclaimed in 1940 on the farm Witkoppen, where Fraser had first started gold mining.

The town was laid out by another Scot by the name of Maconachie (full name unknown). His naming of the streets was interesting: he used the names of poets and authors from the British Isles. This was unusual for a mining town in the heart of "Afrikanerdom". The rule was broken as Afrikaner nationalism grew dominant in the 1960s, and some of the British literary names were replaced.

The 1960 census recorded a total population of 22,425 residents.

The town was near the epicentre of an earthquake with a magnitude of 5.5 on the Richter scale which struck on 5 August 2014, killing one person.

== Tourist attractions ==
- Ground Nut Factory
- Harmony Gold Mine

== Sports ==
The Oppenheimer Stadium, a large football (soccer) stadium in Orkney, was increased in size for the 2010 Football World Cup, although it was not used in the World Cup. The Orkney Stadium Disaster, when 42 fans died at the stadium in 1991, was the second worst sports disaster in South Africa. The stadium is not currently in use, the stadium is currently in disrepair and unsafe for use.

== In the media ==
Orkney enjoyed fame in the late 1980s and early 1990s as the setting for a popular Afrikaans television sitcom called Orkney Snork Nie. The word "snork" means "snore": so the joke in the title means "Orkney doesn't snore". Even further back the Afrikaans jab at the sleepy town was "Ook nie dorp nie; ook nie plaas nie". In this the pun is on the "ook nie" ("also not" or "neither") sounding like "Orkney"; and the full meaning being "neither town nor farm".

The notion of "sleepy" is misleading. Some of the deepest and richest gold mines have been worked in the area for decades. But the social life for the youth was better in Klerksdorp.

== Arms ==
Coat of arms of Orkney, South Africa

Notes
Crest
A demi-Kudu proper with sinister hoof resting on a bezant.
Escutcheon
Azure, a dragon ship Or, sail set Argent, oars in action, pennant Gules, sailing on a base wavy Argent charged with a bar wavy Azure; on a chief Vert fimbriated Or a cogwheel Or between two bezants.
Motto
Industria Et Spe
