= Kordovan-e Olya =

Village in Bushehr province, Iran

Kordovan-e Olya Persian: کردوان علیا
- Village
- Location within Iran
- Coordinates: 28°11′09″N 51°25′48″E
- Country: Iran
- Province: Bushehr
- County: Dashti
- District: Kaki
- Rural District: Kabgan

Population (2016)
  - Total: 696
- Time zone: UTC+3:30 (IRST)

Kordovan-e Olya (Persian: کردوان علیا) (Note: Also romanized as Kordovān-e ‘Olyā; also known as Kardovan, Kerdevān-e Bālā, Kerdevān Khāneh, Kordavān, Kordavān-e Bālā, Kordovān, Kordovān-e Bālā, Kordovān-e Mīānī, Kordovān-e Vosţá, Kurdavan, and Kurdavān Khāneh) is a village in Kabgan Rural District of Kaki District in Dashti County, Bushehr province, Iran.

== Demographics ==
=== Language and dialect ===
The dialect of the village is the traditional dialect from Dashti. The Dashti dialect is an original Iranian dialect dating back to the Pahlavi Sassanid language and now people are using words that were used in the Pahlavi language, after some centuries.

=== Population ===
At the time of the 2006 National Census, the village's population was 679 in 159 households. The following census in 2011 counted 760 people in 198 households. The 2016 census measured the population of the village as 696 people in 221 households.

== Geography ==
Kordovan-e Olya is at the 70km mark from Dashti and north of the Mound River. Esmail Mahmudi, Kordovan-e Sofla, Kordovan-e Raisi, Miteh, and Ziarat are nearby villages.

== Culture ==
Most of the people are farmers and women create artifacts. Kordovan-e Olya has been the land of the scientists who were very famous in Dashti County.

== Notable people ==
Zaer Mohammad Ali Dashti or Faez Dashti was a poet born in Kordovan-e Olya in 1834, and lived there his whole life. Abd-ol-Reza Kordavani or Mahzun was another poet in Kordovan.
