= 2013 Iran earthquake =

2013 Iran earthquake may refer to several deadly earthquakes that struck Iran in 2013:

- 2013 Bushehr earthquake
- 2013 Saravan earthquake
- 2013 Borazjan earthquake

== See also ==
- List of earthquakes in 2013
- List of earthquakes in Iran
