= Kordovan =

Kordovan or Kardovan or Kerdevan or Kordavan or Kurdavan (Persian: كُردَوان) may refer to:

- Kardovan, Semnan Province
- Kordovan-e Olya, Bushehr Province
- Kordovan-e Raisi, Bushehr Province
- Kordovan-e Sofla, Bushehr Province
- Kordovan, West Azerbaijan
- Kardovan, Semnan Province (Persian: كَردَوان)

== See also ==
- Kordofan, a former administrative division of Sudan
- Cordovan, a demonym for Córdoba
