= 2013 Nantou earthquake =

2013 Nantou earthquake may refer to:

- March 2013 Nantou earthquake
- June 2013 Nantou earthquake

== See also ==
- List of earthquakes in 2013
- List of earthquakes in Taiwan
