= Sheykhian =

Sheykhian or Sheykhiyan or Sheykheyan (Persian: شيخيان) may refer to:

- Sheykhian Mari
- Sheykhian-e Shahab
- Sheykhian Solonji
- Bagh Pir, Bushehr (Sheykhian Bagh Pir)
