= Gankhak =

Gankhak or Gonkhak (Persian: گنخك) may refer to:

- Gankhak-e Kowra
- Gankhak-e Raisi
- Gankhak-e Sheykhi
