= Derazi =

Derazi (Persian: درازي) may refer to:

- Derazi, Bushehr
- Derazi, Lorestan
