= Faqih, Iran =

Faqih (Persian: فقيه), in Iran, may refer to:

- Faqih Ahmadan
- Faqih-e Hasanan
