= Kulul =

Kulul may refer to:

- Kulul, California, former Costanoan settlement in Monterey County, California
- Lake Kulul, in Eritrea
- Kulul, Iran, a village in Bushehr Province, Iran
