= Miteh =

Meyteh مِيته
- Village
- Location within Iran
- Coordinates: 28°10′38″N 51°26′39″E
- Country: Iran
- Province: Bushehr
- County: Dashti
- Bakhsh: Kaki
- Rural District: Kabgan

Population (2006)
  - Total: 71
- Time zone: UTC+3:30 (IRST)
  - Summer (DST): UTC+4:30 (IRDT)

Miteh (Persian: ميته, also Romanized as Mīteh) is a village in Kabgan Rural District, Kaki District, Dashti County, Bushehr Province, Iran. At the 2006 census, its population was 71, in 12 families.
