= Gaz Deraz =

Village in Bushehr province, Iran

Gaz Deraz Persian: گزدراز
- Village
- Location within Iran
- Coordinates: 28°18′53″N 51°24′52″E
- Country: Iran
- Province: Bushehr
- County: Dashti
- District: Kaki
- Rural District: Cheghapur

Population (2016)
  - Total: 161
- Time zone: UTC+3:30 (IRST)

Gaz Deraz (Persian: گزدراز) (Note: Also romanized as Gaz Derāz and Gez Derāz; also known as Gazeh Darāz and Gāzeh Derāz) is a village in Cheghapur Rural District of Kaki District in Dashti County, Bushehr province, Iran.

== Demographics ==
=== Population ===
At the time of the 2006 National Census, the village's population was 142 in 34 households. The following census in 2011 counted 122 people in 32 households. The 2016 census measured the population of the village as 161 people in 53 households.
