= Ba Monir =

Village in Bushehr province, Iran

Ba Monir Persian: بامنير
- Village
- Location within Iran
- Coordinates: 28°25′18″N 51°30′18″E
- Country: Iran
- Province: Bushehr
- County: Dashti
- District: Kaki
- Rural District: Cheghapur

Population (2016)
  - Total: 417
- Time zone: UTC+3:30 (IRST)

Ba Monir (Persian: بامنير) (Note: Also romanized as Bā Monīr; also known as Bāb Monīr) is a village in Cheghapur Rural District of Kaki District in Dashti County, Bushehr province, Iran.

== Demographics ==
=== Population ===
At the time of the 2006 National Census, the village's population was 430 in 81 households. The following census in 2011 counted 467 people in 115 households. The 2016 census measured the population of the village as 417 people in 129 households. It was the most populous village in its rural district.
