= Sheykhian Solonji =

Sheykhian Solonji شيخيان سلنجي
- Village
- Location within Iran
- Coordinates: 28°16′35″N 51°26′29″E
- Country: Iran
- Province: Bushehr
- County: Dashti
- Bakhsh: Kaki
- Rural District: Kabgan

Population (2006)
  - Total: 178
- Time zone: UTC+3:30 (IRST)
  - Summer (DST): UTC+4:30 (IRDT)

Sheykhian Solonji (Persian: شيخيان سلنجي, also Romanized as Sheykhīān Solonjī; also known as Kūrī and Sheykhīān) is a village in Kabgan Rural District, Kaki District, Dashti County, Bushehr Province, Iran. At the 2006 census, its population was 178, in 34 families.
