= Hoseyn-e Zaeri =

Village in Bushehr province, Iran

Hoseyn-e Zaeri Persian: حسين زايري
- Village
- Location within Iran
- Coordinates: 28°28′22″N 51°28′51″E
- Country: Iran
- Province: Bushehr
- County: Dashti
- District: Kaki
- Rural District: Cheghapur

Population (2016)
  - Total: 341
- Time zone: UTC+3:30 (IRST)

Hoseyn-e Zaeri (Persian: حسين زايري) (Note: Also romanized as Hosein Za’eri, Ḩoseyn Zā’erī, and Ḩoseyn-e Zā’erī; also known as Hasan Zīri and Ḩosfyn Zā’erī) is a village in Cheghapur Rural District of Kaki District in Dashti County, Bushehr province, Iran.

== Demographics ==
=== Population ===
At the time of the 2006 National Census, the village's population was 420 in 72 households. The following census in 2011 counted 338 people in 77 households. The 2016 census measured the population of the village as 341 people in 99 households.
