= Khvormuj =

City in Bushehr province, Iran

Khvormuj Persian: خورموج
- City
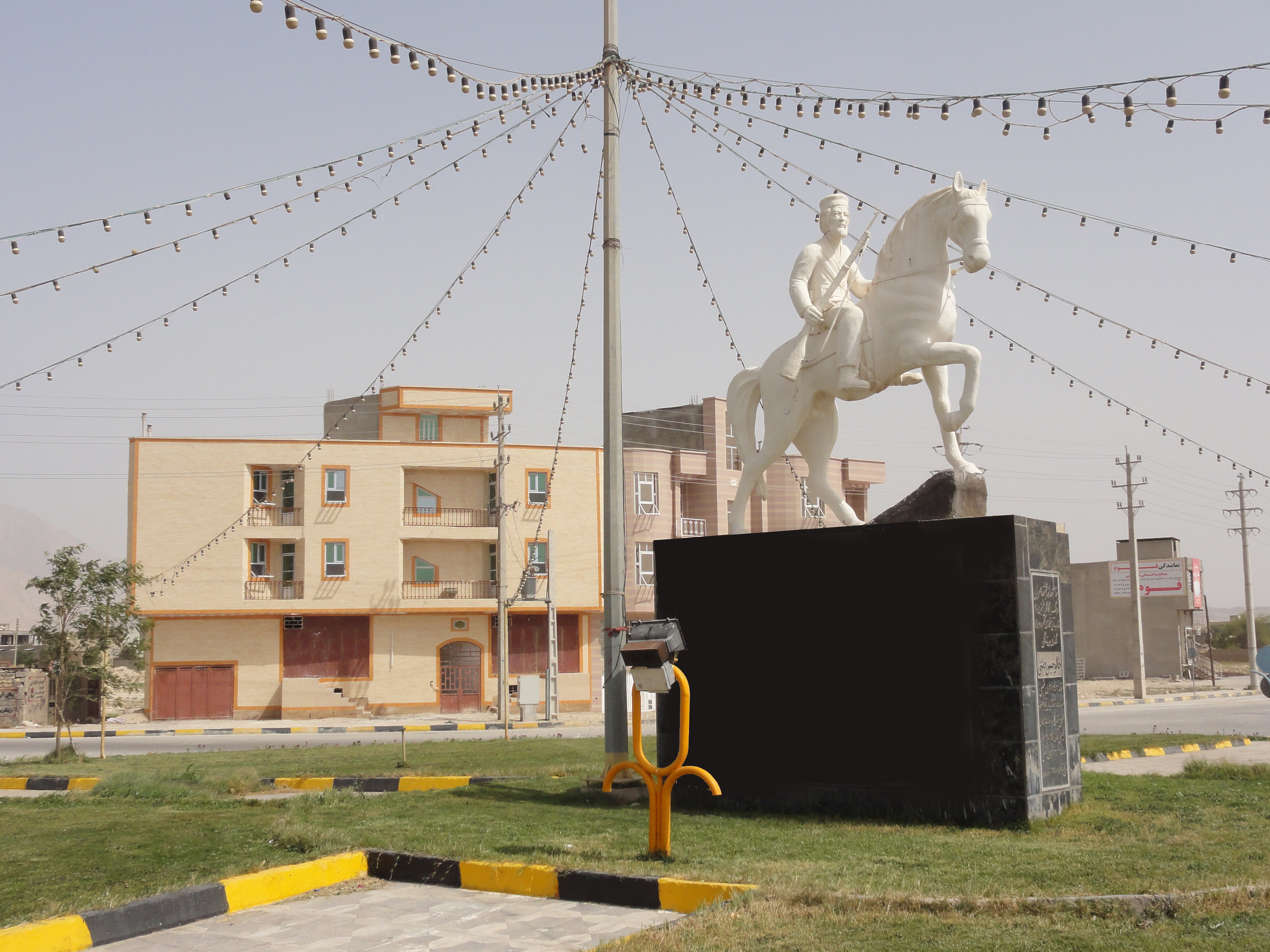
- Khalo Hossein Dashti Square in Khvormuj

- Location within Iran
- Coordinates: 28°39′26″N 51°22′52″E
- Country: Iran
- Province: Bushehr
- County: Dashti
- District: Central

Area
  - Total: 1,280 km^{2} (490 sq mi)

Population (2019)
  - Total: 60,942
  - Density: 47.6/km^{2} (123/sq mi)
- Time zone: UTC+3:30 (IRST)

Khvormuj (Persian: خورموج) (Note: Also romanized as Khūrmūj; also known as Khormoj and Khormūj) is a city in the Central District of Dashti County, Bushehr province, Iran, serving as capital of both the county and the district. The narrow river Shur traverses the valley, 7 km to the west of the city.

== Demographics ==
=== Language and ethnicity ===
Persians constitute 95% of the inhabitants, and the majority speaks the Dashti dialect.

=== Population ===
At the time of the 2006 National Census, the city's population was 31,667 in 6,966 households. The following census in 2011 counted 34,944 people in 8,777 households. The 2016 census measured the population of the city as 40,722 people in 11,537 households.

== Attractions ==
=== Khormoj Castle ===
Khormoj Castle (Persian: قلعه خورموج; also spelled Khormuj or Khvormuj; also known as Mohammad Khan Dashti Castle) is a historic fortification in Khormoj, Dashti County, Bushehr Province, Iran. The surviving elements largely date to the Qajar dynasty period, although local tradition holds that the site may have earlier foundations.

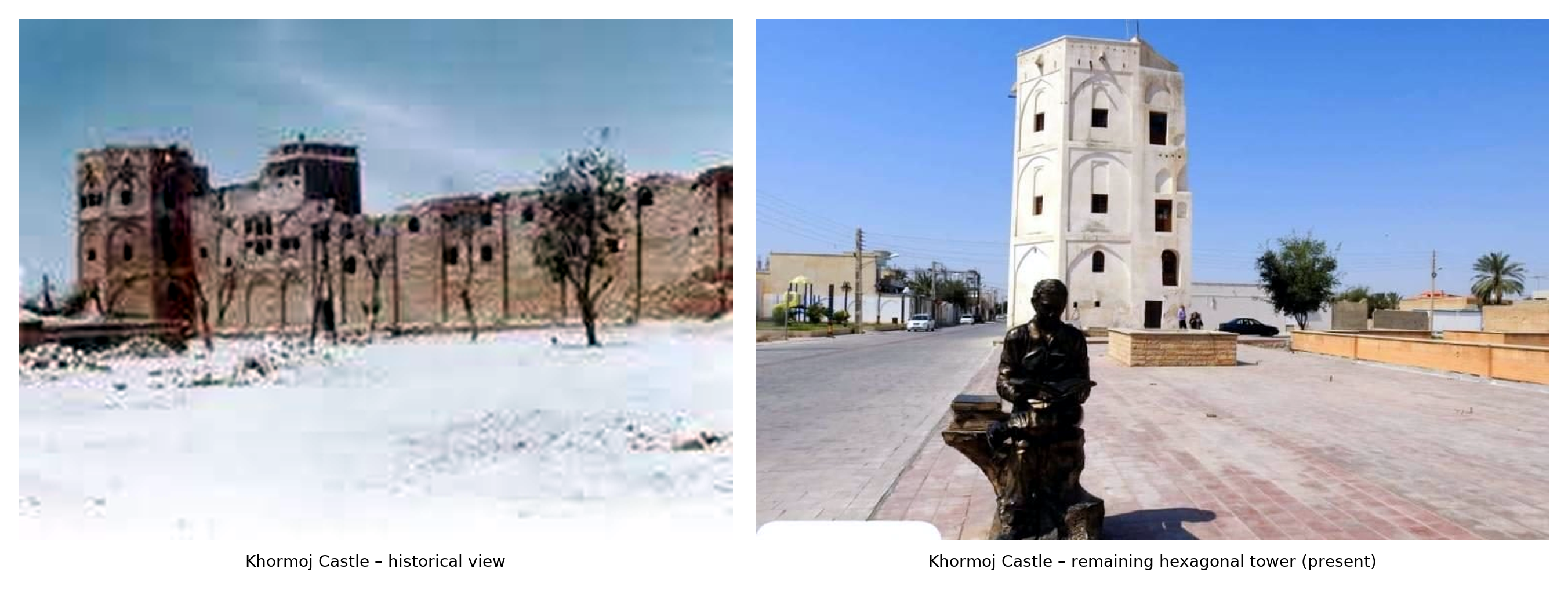
Khormoj Castle, then and now: historic view and surviving hexagonal tower.

The original complex reportedly comprised four curtain walls with towers, a central residence (mansion), stables, a guardhouse (qaravolkhaneh), and a bathhouse supplied by a qanat system. A 2025 study documents the discovery and description of the castle's bathhouse near the fort remains, following archaeological excavations. Architectural details reflect Qajar design combined with decorative motifs reminiscent of Seljuk and Sasanian styles.

Today, only a single hexagonal tower remains standing. The site is listed as a national monument of Iran (registration no. 3032; 2000). The castle is also commonly referred to as Mohammad Khan Dashti Castle.

==== Architecture ====
Accounts describe the complex as having four palisades with towers, a central mansion, stables, a guardhouse, and a bathhouse connected to a water source; parts of the complex were reportedly demolished in the late 1970s during urban works. Descriptions emphasize Qajar-period brickwork and plaster decoration with stylistic allusions to Seljuk ornament and Sasanian fortification layouts.

==== Comparative note ====
Hexagonal-plan towers also occur elsewhere; for comparison, the Great Tower (Yellow Tower of Gwent) at Raglan Castle in Monmouthshire, Wales, is a 15th-century hexagonal keep set within a moat.

=== Shrine of Mir Aram Shah ===
The Shrine of Mir Aram Shah (Persian: بقعهٔ میر ارم شاه) is a revered religious site located on a low hill in the western part of Khormoj, south of the city's Martyrs’ Cemetery (Golzar-e Shohada). The shrine dates to the late Qajar era and houses an unusually long tombstone—about twelve meters—adorned with intricate stone carvings. According to local accounts, the tomb is attributed to Mir Aram, traditionally said to be a descendant of Sam son of Noah, though some researchers link it to a pre-Islamic or Sasanian figure. The site, also known as Pir-e Chehel Gazu, remains a popular place of prayer and pilgrimage, especially on Thursdays.

=== Mother Square ===
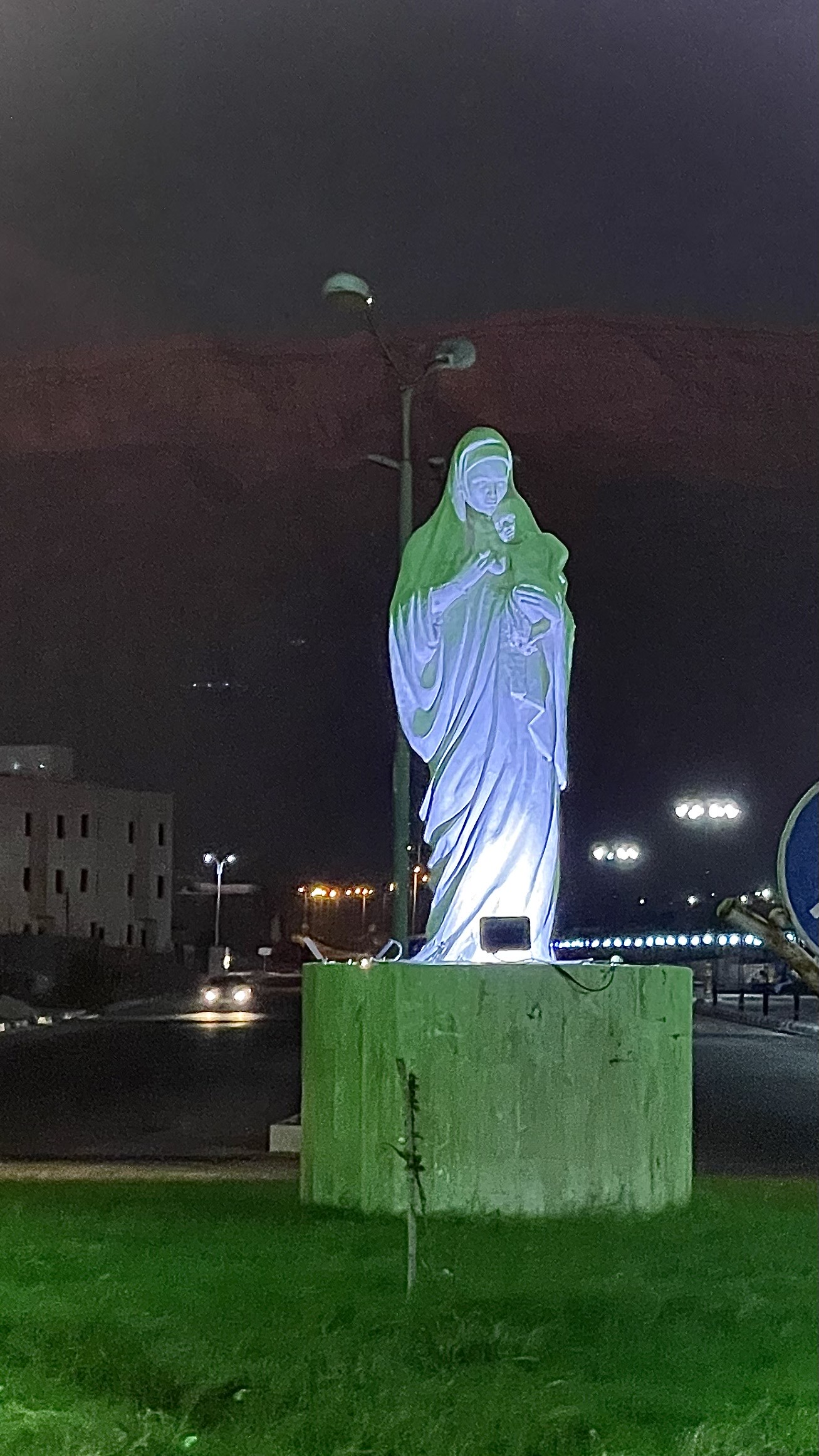
Mother Square in Khvormuj

Another prominent landmark in Khormuj is Mother Square (Persian: میدان مادر), located at one of the city's main intersections. At the center of the square stands a large statue symbolizing motherhood, depicting a mother holding a child. The monument is illuminated at night and has become one of the recognizable symbols of the city.

== See also ==
- Khormoj Castle
- List of castles in Iran
- Qajar architecture
- 2013 Bushehr earthquake

Media related to Khormoj at Wikimedia Commons
