= Sheykhian-e Shahab =

Sheykhian-e Shahab شيخيان شهاب
- Village
- Location within Iran
- Coordinates: 28°17′21″N 51°26′05″E
- Country: Iran
- Province: Bushehr
- County: Dashti
- Bakhsh: Kaki
- Rural District: Kabgan

Population (2006)
  - Total: 82
- Time zone: UTC+3:30 (IRST)
  - Summer (DST): UTC+4:30 (IRDT)

Sheykhian-e Shahab (Persian: شيخيان شهاب, also Romanized as Sheykhīān-e Shahāb) is a village in Kabgan Rural District, Kaki District, Dashti County, Bushehr Province, Iran. At the 2006 census, its population was 82, in 17 families.
