= Boniad =

Village in Bushehr province, Iran

Boniad Persian: بنياد
- Village
- Location within Iran
- Coordinates: 28°19′11″N 51°32′44″E
- Country: Iran
- Province: Bushehr
- County: Dashti
- District: Kaki
- Rural District: Kaki

Population (2016)
  - Total: 819
- Time zone: UTC+3:30 (IRST)

Boniad (Persian: بنياد) (Note: Also romanized as Bonīād and Bonyād; also known as Bonīāb) is a village in Kaki Rural District of Kaki District in Dashti County, Bushehr province, Iran.

== Demographics ==
=== Population ===
At the time of the 2006 National Census, the village's population was 831 in 157 households. The following census in 2011 counted 788 people in 186 households. The 2016 census measured the population of the village as 819 people in 221 households. It was the most populous village in its rural district.
