= Naseri, Bushehr =

Village in Bushehr province, Iran

Naseri Persian: ناصري
- Village
- Location within Iran
- Coordinates: 28°27′18″N 51°30′01″E
- Country: Iran
- Province: Bushehr
- County: Dashti
- District: Kaki
- Rural District: Cheghapur

Population (2016)
  - Total: 177
- Time zone: UTC+3:30 (IRST)

Naseri (Persian: ناصري) (Note: Also romanized as Nāşerī) is a village in Cheghapur Rural District of Kaki District in Dashti County, Bushehr province, Iran.

== Demographics ==
=== Population ===
At the time of the 2006 National Census, the village's population was 220 in 37 households. The following census in 2011 counted 166 people in 42 households. The 2016 census measured the population of the village as 177 people in 48 households.
