= Bagh Pir, Bushehr =

Bagh Pir باغ پير
- Village
- Location within Iran
- Coordinates: 28°15′27″N 51°27′09″E
- Country: Iran
- Province: Bushehr
- County: Dashti
- Bakhsh: Kaki
- Rural District: Kabgan

Population (2006)
  - Total: 160
- Time zone: UTC+3:30 (IRST)
  - Summer (DST): UTC+4:30 (IRDT)

Bagh Pir (Persian: باغ پير, also Romanized as Bāgh Pīr, Bāgh-e Pīr, and Bāgh-i-Pīr; also known as Morādī) is a village in Kabgan Rural District, Kaki District, Dashti County, Bushehr Province, Iran. At the 2006 census, its population was 160, in 33 families.
