= Balangestan, Bushehr =

Village in Bushehr province, Iran

Balangestan Persian: بالنگستان
- Village
- Location within Iran
- Coordinates: 28°14′23″N 51°16′55″E
- Country: Iran
- Province: Bushehr
- County: Dashti
- District: Kaki
- Rural District: Kabgan

Population (2016)
  - Total: 595
- Time zone: UTC+3:30 (IRST)

Balangestan (Persian: بالنگستان) (Note: Also romanized as Bālangestān; also known as Bālangistān, Golestān (گلستان) and Palangestān) is a village in Kabgan Rural District of Kaki District in Dashti County, Bushehr province, Iran.

== Demographics ==
=== Population ===
At the time of the 2006 National Census, the village's population was 570 in 140 households. The following census in 2011 counted 587 people in 166 households. The 2016 census measured the population of the village as 595 people in 182 households.
