= Esmail Mahmudi, Kabgan =

Esmail Mahmudi اسماعيل محمودي
- Village
- Location within Iran
- Coordinates: 28°10′29″N 51°25′09″E
- Country: Iran
- Province: Bushehr
- County: Dashti
- Bakhsh: Kaki
- Rural District: Kabgan

Population (2006)
  - Total: 198
- Time zone: UTC+3:30 (IRST)
  - Summer (DST): UTC+4:30 (IRDT)

Esmail Mahmudi (Persian: اسماعيل محمودي, also Romanized as Esmā‘īl Maḩmūdī and Esmāeel Maḩmūdī) is a village in Kabgan Rural District, Kaki District, Dashti County, Bushehr Province, Iran. At the 2006 census, its population was 198, in 41 families.
