= Faqih Ahmadan =

Faqih Ahmadan فقيه احمدان
- Village
- Location within Iran
- Coordinates: 28°23′08″N 51°21′14″E
- Country: Iran
- Province: Bushehr
- County: Dashti
- Bakhsh: Kaki
- Rural District: Cheghapur

Population (2006)
  - Total: 27
- Time zone: UTC+3:30 (IRST)
  - Summer (DST): UTC+4:30 (IRDT)

Faqih Ahmadan (Persian: فقيه احمدان, also Romanized as Faqīh Aḩmadan; also known as Faqīh Ahmad, Fagīh Aḩmadān, Faqih Ahmed, and Faqīh-he Aḩmadān) is a village in Cheghapur Rural District, Kaki District, Dashti County, Bushehr Province, Iran. At the 2006 census, its population was 27, in 8 families.
