= Talkhu =

Village in Bushehr province, Iran

Talkhu Persian: تلخو
- Village
- Location within Iran
- Coordinates: 28°22′33″N 51°30′19″E
- Country: Iran
- Province: Bushehr
- County: Dashti
- District: Kaki
- Rural District: Kaki

Population (2016)
  - Total: 690
- Time zone: UTC+3:30 (IRST)

Talkhu (Persian: تلخو) (Note: Also romanized as Talkhū) is a village in Kaki Rural District of Kaki District in Dashti County, Bushehr province, Iran.

== Demographics ==
=== Population ===
At the time of the 2006 National Census, the village's population was 651 in 128 households. The following census in 2011 counted 693 people in 179 households. The 2016 census measured the population of the village as 690 people in 187 households.
