= Gankhak-e Raisi =

Gankhak-e Raisi گنخک رئیسی
- Village
- Location within Iran
- Coordinates: 28°14′41″N 51°36′04″E
- Country: Iran
- Province: Bushehr
- County: Dashti
- Bakhsh: Kaki
- Rural District: Kaki

Population (2006)
  - Total: 66
- Time zone: UTC+3:30 (IRST)
  - Summer (DST): UTC+4:30 (IRDT)

Gankhak-e Raisi (Persian: گنخک رئیسی, also Romanized as Gankhak-e Ra’īsī; also known as Gankhak-e Ro’sā, Kankhak-e Ra’īsī, and Kankhak-e Ro’sā) is a village in Kaki Rural District, Kaki District, Dashti County, Bushehr Province, Iran. At the 2006 census, its population was 66, in 15 families.
