= Lavar-e Saheli =

Village in Bushehr province, Iran

Lavar-e Saheli Persian: لاورساحلي
- Village
- Location within Iran
- Coordinates: 28°14′52″N 51°16′22″E
- Country: Iran
- Province: Bushehr
- County: Dashti
- District: Kaki
- Rural District: Kabgan

Population (2016)
  - Total: 531
- Time zone: UTC+3:30 (IRST)

Lavar-e Saheli (Persian: لاورساحلي) (Note: Also romanized as Lāvar-e Sāḩelī; also known as Lāvar and Lāvar Kabkān) is a village in Kabgan Rural District of Kaki District in Dashti County, Bushehr province, Iran.

== Demographics ==
=== Population ===
At the time of the 2006 National Census, the village's population was 437 in 117 households. The following census in 2011 counted 527 people in 151 households. The 2016 census measured the population of the village as 531 people in 153 households.
