= Faqih-e Hasanan =

Faqih-e Hasanan فقيه حسنان
- Village
- Location within Iran
- Coordinates: 28°29′14″N 51°17′38″E
- Country: Iran
- Province: Bushehr
- County: Dashti
- Bakhsh: Central
- Rural District: Khvormuj

Population (2006)
  - Total: 147
- Time zone: UTC+3:30 (IRST)
  - Summer (DST): UTC+4:30 (IRDT)

Faqih-e Hasanan (Persian: فقيه حسنان, also Romanized as Faqīh-e Ḩasanān and Faqīh Ḩasanān; also known as Fadī Hasān, Faghih Hasnān, and Faoih Hasanān) is a village in Khvormuj Rural District, in the Central District of Dashti County, Bushehr Province, Iran. At the 2006 census, its population was 147, in 30 families.
