= Kordovan-e Raisi =

Kordovan-e Raisi کردوان رئیسی
- Village
- Country: Iran
- Province: Bushehr
- County: Dashti
- Bakhsh: Kaki
- Rural District: Kabgan

Population (2006)
  - Total: 281
- Time zone: UTC+3:30 (IRST)
  - Summer (DST): UTC+4:30 (IRDT)

Kordovan-e Raisi (Persian: کردوان رئیسی, also Romanized as Kordovān-e Ra'īsī) is a village in Kabgan Rural District, Kaki District, Dashti County, Bushehr Province, Iran. At the 2006 census, its population was 281, in 59 families.
