= Kaki, Iran =

City in Bushehr province, Iran

Kaki Persian: کاکی
- City
- Location within Iran
- Coordinates: 28°20′18″N 51°31′26″E
- Country: Iran
- Province: Bushehr
- County: Dashti
- District: Kaki

Population (2016)
  - Total: 12,119
- Time zone: UTC+3:30 (IRST)

Kaki (Persian: کاکی) (Note: Also romanized as Kākī) is a city in, and the capital of, Kaki District in Dashti County, Bushehr province, Iran. It also serves as the administrative center for Kaki Rural District.

== Demographics ==
=== Language ===
The vast majority of the city is ancestrally Farsi-speaking.

=== Population ===
At the time of the 2006 National Census, the city's population was 9,893 in 1,983 households. The following census in 2011 counted 10,156 people in 2,519 households. The 2016 census measured the population of the city as 12,119 people in 3,237 households.

== Notable people ==
Mohammad Mahdi Pourfatimi, Shia cleric

== See also ==
- 2013 Bushehr earthquake
