= Charak, Bushehr =

Village in Bushehr province, Iran

Charak Persian: چارك
- Village
- Location within Iran
- Coordinates: 28°34′36″N 51°14′54″E
- Country: Iran
- Province: Bushehr
- County: Dashti
- District: Central
- Rural District: Khvormuj

Population (2016)
  - Total: 738
- Time zone: UTC+3:30 (IRST)

Charak (Persian: چارك) (Note: Also romanized as Chārak; also known as Shārak) is a village in Khvormuj Rural District of the Central District in Dashti County, Bushehr province, Iran.

== Demographics ==
=== Population ===
At the time of the 2006 National Census, the village's population was 760 in 171 households. The following census in 2011 counted 773 people in 229 households. The 2016 census measured the population of the village as 738 people in 242 households.
