= Gankhak-e Kowra =

Village in Bushehr province, Iran

Gankhak-e Kowra Persian: گنخك كورا
- Village
- Location within Iran
- Coordinates: 28°17′19″N 51°34′34″E
- Country: Iran
- Province: Bushehr
- County: Dashti
- District: Kaki
- Rural District: Kaki

Population (2016)
  - Total: 292
- Time zone: UTC+3:30 (IRST)

Gankhak-e Kowra (Persian: گنخك كورا) (Note: Also romanized as Gankhak-e Kowrā and Gonkhak-e Kowrā; also known as Kowrā and Kūrā) is a village in Kaki Rural District of Kaki District in Dashti County, Bushehr province, Iran.

== Demographics ==
=== Population ===
At the time of the 2006 National Census, the village's population was 293 in 55 households. The following census in 2011 counted 281 people in 67 households. The 2016 census measured the population of the village as 292 people in 80 households.
