= Baduleh =

City in Bushehr province, Iran

Baduleh Persian: بادوله
- City
- Location within Iran
- Coordinates: 28°23′49″N 51°30′04″E
- Country: Iran
- Province: Bushehr
- County: Dashti
- District: Kaki
- Established as a city: 2012

Population (2016)
  - Total: 4,028
- Time zone: UTC+3:30 (IRST)

Baduleh (Persian: بادوله) (Note: Also romanized as Bādūleh; also known as Bārdulī) is a city in Kaki District of Dashti County, Bushehr province, Iran, serving as the administrative center for Cheghapur Rural District.

== Demographics ==
=== Population ===
At the time of the 2006 National Census, Baduleh's population was 3,558 in 755 households, when it was a village in Cheghapur Rural District. The following census in 2011 counted 3,680 people in 927 households. The 2016 census measured the population as 4,028 people in 1,097 households, by which time Baduleh had been converted to a city.
