= Cordovan =

Cordovan may refer to:

- A demonym for any of several places named Córdoba
- Shell cordovan, a type of leather
- Cordovan (color), a shade of red-brown
- Cordovan (bee), a breed of the Western honey bee

== See also ==
- El Cordobés (The Cordovan), a matador of the 1960s
- Kordofan, a former administrative division of Sudan
- Kordovan, the name of several locations in Iran
- Cordofan pea, a plant species
