= 2013 Saravan earthquake =

2013 earthquake in Iran's Sistan va Baluchestan province

- Location within Iran Location within Southwest Asia
- UTC time: 2013-04-16 10:44:20
- ISC event: 606824152
- USGS-ANSS: ComCat
- Local date: 16 April 2013
- Local time: 15:14 IRDT
- Magnitude: 7.7 M_{w}
- Depth: 82 km (51 mi)
- Epicenter: 28.107°N 62.053°E
- Areas affected: Iran; Pakistan
- Max. intensity: MMI VIII (Severe)
- Casualties: 35 deaths (1 in Iran, 34 in Pakistan); 117 injured

The 2013 Saravan earthquake occurred with a moment magnitude of 7.7 at 15:14 pm IRDT (UTC+4:30) on 16 April. The shock struck a mountainous area between the cities of Saravan and Khash in Sistan and Balochistan province, Iran, close to the border with Pakistan, with a duration of about 25 seconds. The earthquake occurred at an intermediate depth in the Arabian plate lithosphere, near the boundary between the subducting Arabian plate and the overriding Eurasian plate at a depth of about 80 km.

It was the largest earthquake in Iran within the last 300 years, equal in magnitude to the one that shook East Azerbaijan in 1721, which had killed up to 250,000 people, and possibly the largest in the last half-century. The earthquake followed a magnitude 6.3 event near Bushehr. The town of Mashkel was close to the quake's epicentre, and around 85 percent of the city's buildings were demolished. Thirty-five people were killed in the earthquake.

== Primary effects ==
The earthquake struck 83 kilometres (52 mi) east of the city of Saravan, Iran, and was felt throughout much of eastern Iran and southern Pakistan, and as far away as Riyadh, Manama, Doha, Abu Dhabi, Muscat, and Delhi. Initial sources cited that close to 100 people lost their lives in Iran and that Iran had confirmed the deaths of 40, but these sources have been disputed; Iran has since officially denied death counts, only reporting injuries, as of 14:00 UTC. Although the earthquake was much stronger than previous ones in the area, the depth and the terrain/population density above the focus, as well as predominating building construction being relatively light materials such as mud and wood, meant that there were relatively few casualties in Iran, although the number of casualties was higher in the neighbouring state of Pakistan, with at least 34 reported deaths. According to the Iranian Red Crescent, all communications in the area have been cut, and rescue teams have been dispatched. Buildings were evacuated as far away as Delhi and on the Arabian Peninsula, and many buildings in Iran were completely destroyed.

== Tectonics ==
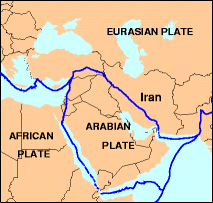
Arabian plate boundaries with the Eurasian, African and Indian plates

The quake reportedly occurred within the subducting Arabian plate below the overriding Eurasian plate. The Strait of Hormuz separates two forms of plate collision. To the northwest, continental crust portions of the Arabian and Eurasian plates are colliding, resulting in compressive faulting. To the southeast, dense oceanic crust of the Arabian plate is subducting underneath the Eurasian plate at the Makran Trench.

Iran lies on the fault line between the Arabian plate and the Eurasian plate. The collision of these two plates cause most of the earthquakes that strike Iran. The specific area of the fault that lies below the Sistan and Balochistan province is referred to as the Makran region. In this area the Arabian plate is folding under, or subducting, the Eurasia plate.

=== Earthquake activity ===
There has been an increase in earthquake activity in not only Iran but also neighboring Pakistan. In the entire 20th century Pakistan and Iran experienced a combined total of twenty-six earthquakes. Within the first thirteen years of the 21st century Pakistan and Iran have suffered a combined total of eighteen earthquakes, with the most recent earthquake in Iran occurring on 16 April 2013, and the most recent earthquake in Pakistan occurring on 28 September 2013. These earthquakes can range from microearthquakes, measuring less than a 2.0 on the moment magnitude scale (M_{w}), to very large events measuring 7.0–7.9 M_{w}. The smallest earthquakes may not be felt, while major earthquakes can be assessed at VIII (Severe) or higher on the Mercalli intensity scale.

==== Subduction ====
Subduction usually occurs at convergent fault lines. The underlying tectonic plate descends, or subducts, into the Earth's mantle. Earthquakes occurring at these faults are very large in magnitude and scale. In this case the disappearing Arabian plate is part of the oceanic crust while the Eurasia plate is part of the continental crust.

==== The Makran region ====
The Makran Region Of Pakistan and Iran is characterized by three mountain ranges. These mountain ranges, the Makran Coastal Range, the Central Makran Range, and the Siahan Range, are located in the southwestern area of the Balochistan province of Pakistan. These ranges are the product of years of collision between the Indian plate and the Eurasia tectonic plate. The Makran Region is also the covering point of three tectonic plates. The Indian plate, Eurasia plate, and the Arabian plate meet and converge in this area.

== Preparedness and response ==
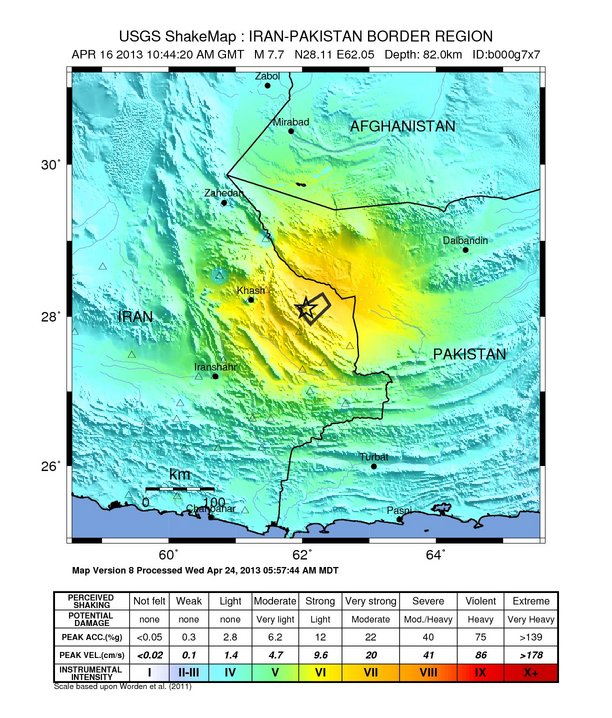
USGS ShakeMap for the mainshock

=== Scientific preparedness ===
There is no method to accurately predict an earthquake, however, there are systems which attempt to give early warnings when earthquakes occur. Currently the most all-inclusive system is Japan's Earthquake Early Warning system. This system is monitored by the Japanese Meteorological Agency The JMA sends out the warnings through the television, mobile devices, the internet, and the radio as soon as an earthquake is detected. Other countries have similar systems that are mostly limited to a particular region, for example, the United States' early warning system is in place only for the earthquake disposed west coast.

One study conducted in California, United States suggests there may be a new way to more precisely presage earthquakes. This group of scientists, composed of scientists from the Carnegie Institution for Science, Rice University, and the University of California, Berkeley monitored earthquake waves in the San Andreas Fault using seismometers for twenty years. This group discovered cracks in the fault filled with fluids. The scientists noticed that these fluids shifted after being disrupted by seismic activity. Shifting fluids cause faults to weaken, making them more prone to earthquakes.

=== The Red Crescent ===
The International Federation of the Red Cross and the Red Crescent Societies is a nongovernmental organization founded at the 1919 Paris Peace Conference after World War I. The IFRC has seven fundamental principles. These principles include ensuring respect for all humans, making no discrimination as to nationality, religious beliefs, or political opinion, and remaining neutral in times of controversy. The IFRC also has a set of goals it aspires to achieve during each disaster recovery. These four goals are: reducing the deaths, injuries, and impact caused by the disaster; decreasing the amount of death and illnesses caused by diseases and public health emergencies; increasing its ability to address the urgent situations; and promote respect for human dignity while reducing intolerance and discrimination. The IFRC has created stock procedure for disaster relief, however the specifics vary based on the type of disaster, the region the disaster affected, and the amount of destruction caused by the disaster.

On 9 April 2013, the IFRC deployed seventy-five rescue teams to northwestern Iran following a 6.3 magnitude earthquake. The next day over 800 volunteers were in the disaster area helping those affected. A week later a 7.8 magnitude earthquake struck southeastern Iran, the IFRC dispatched air assessment teams in addition to forty ambulances. While the first earthquake was much more destructive, the IFRC was still able to aid both disaster areas.

In June 2013, the IFRC and the Red Crescent Society of the Islamic Republic of Iran agreed to band together in an attempt to redouble their efforts to promote better building codes in disaster prone areas, like Iran. These two groups will also work together to strengthen each group's capacity to respond to disasters. Their goals include erecting resilient buildings, improving disaster preparedness, and further developing the IFRC's disaster response guiltiness. There may be similar partnerships between the IFRC and other countries to achieve similar goals.

== Damage and casualties ==
Casualties by country	Dead	Injured
Pakistan	34	105
Iran	1	12

The afternoon of 16 April 2013 rocked the Sistan and Balochistan province of Iran and Pakistan. The earthquake, measuring 7.7 on the moment magnitude scale, was not only felt in this southeastern area of Iran and Pakistan but also as far away as India's capital city of Delhi. The rural city of Khash, the closest city to the epicenter, is part of Iran's most impoverished province. Most of the citizens of the Sistan and Balochistan province live in either mud shacks or tents. The lack of actual structures contributed to the minimal damage which occurred due to this earthquake. Another contributing factor is the depth of the epicenter. The epicenter of this earthquake was located fifty-nine miles beneath the earth's surface causing damage that would normally be found after an earthquake measuring 4.0 magnitude on the Richter magnitude scale. About 127 people were injured, however these injuries were mostly minor broken bones, and the deaths totaled thirty-five people on both the Iranian and Pakistani side of the earthquake.

== See also ==
- List of earthquakes in 2013
- List of earthquakes in Iran
- List of earthquakes in Pakistan
