= Ziarat, Dashti =

Village in Bushehr province, Iran

Ziarat Persian: زيارت
- Village
- Location within Iran
- Coordinates: 28°09′57″N 51°22′19″E
- Country: Iran
- Province: Bushehr
- County: Dashti
- District: Kaki
- Rural District: Kabgan

Population (2016)
  - Total: 699
- Time zone: UTC+3:30 (IRST)

Ziarat (Persian: زيارت) (Note: Also romanized as Zeyārat, Zīārat, and Ziyārat) is a village in, and the capital of, Kabgan Rural District in Kaki District of Dashti County, Bushehr province, Iran.

== Demographics ==
=== Population ===
At the time of the 2006 National Census, the village's population was 856 in 202 households. The following census in 2011 counted 936 people in 251 households. The 2016 census measured the population of the village as 699 people in 223 households. It was the most populous village in its rural district.
