= June 2013 Nantou earthquake =

Earthquake affecting Taiwan

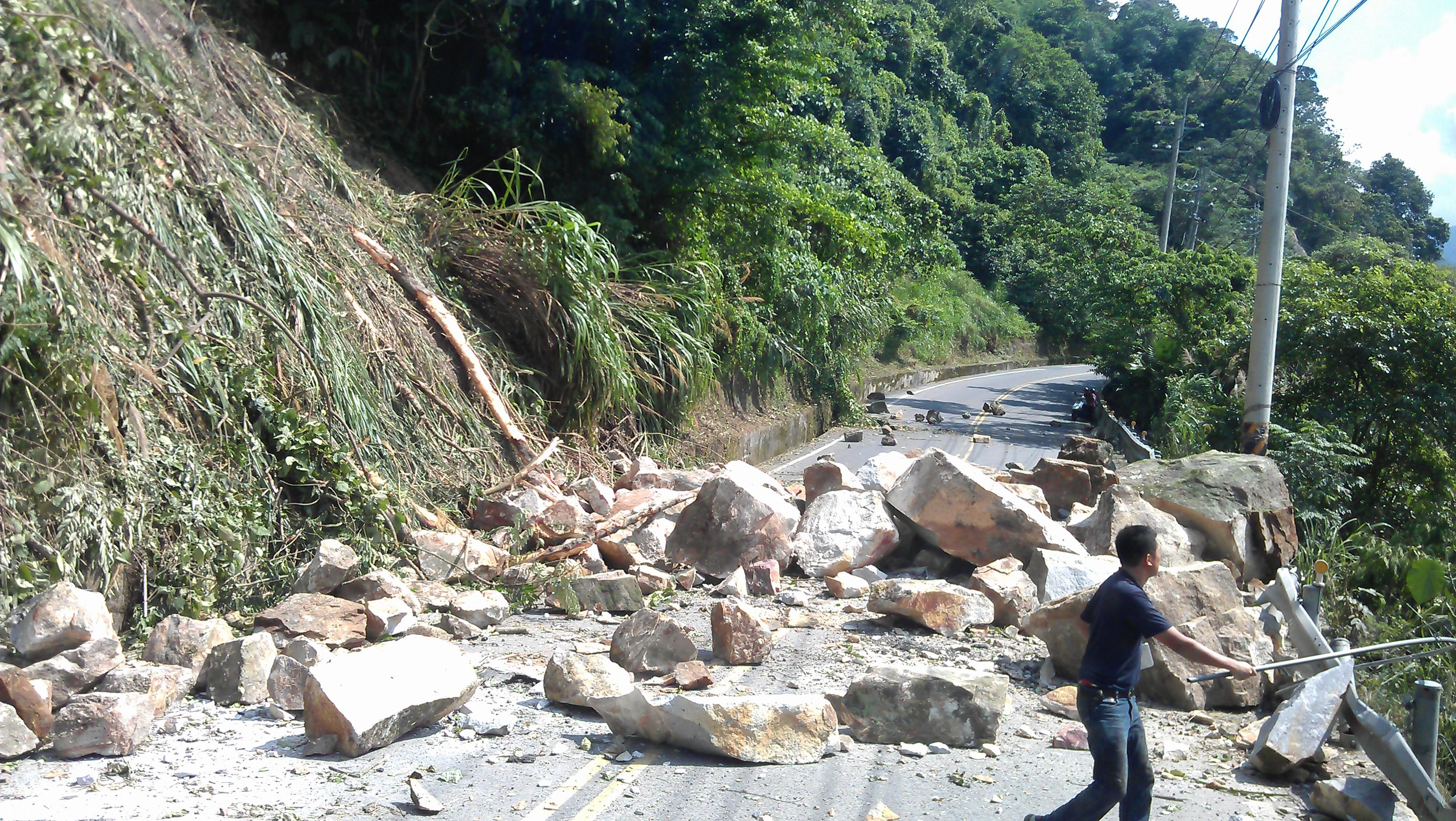

- Location within Taiwan
- UTC time: 2013-06-02 05:43
- ISC event: 603042353
- USGS-ANSS: ComCat
- Local date: 2 June 2013
- Local time: 13:43
- Magnitude: 6.2 M_{w}
- Depth: 10.0 kilometres (6 mi)
- Epicenter: 23.87°N 121.00°E
- Areas affected: Taiwan (Nantou County, Taichung)
- Max. intensity: MMI VI (Strong)
- Casualties: 5 deaths, 18 injuries

The 2013 Nantou earthquake struck central Taiwan with a moment magnitude of 6.2 on 2 June at 1:43 p.m. local time. The epicenter was located in mountainous terrain in Ren'ai Township, Nantou County, Taiwan, not far from Sun Moon Lake, close to the epicentre of another large earthquake a little over two months earlier. News reports indicate that five people were killed; three in Nantou County and two in neighbouring Chiayi County. The earthquake could be felt in Hong Kong, Zhejiang, Fujian, and Guangdong, China.

== See also ==
- List of earthquakes in 2013
- List of earthquakes in Taiwan
