= Gankhak-e Sheykhi =

Village in Bushehr province, Iran

Gankhak-e Sheykhi Persian: گنخك شيخي
- Village
- Location within Iran
- Coordinates: 28°15′58″N 51°35′39″E
- Country: Iran
- Province: Bushehr
- County: Dashti
- District: Kaki
- Rural District: Kaki

Population (2016)
  - Total: 687
- Time zone: UTC+3:30 (IRST)

Gankhak-e Sheykhi (Persian: گنخك شيخي) (Note: Also romanized as Gankhak-e Sheykhī; also known as Gankhak-e Sheykhhā) is a village in Kaki Rural District of Kaki District in Dashti County, Bushehr province, Iran.

== Demographics ==
=== Population ===
At the time of the 2006 National Census, the village's population was 561 in 114 households. The following census in 2011 counted 603 people in 167 households. The 2016 census measured the population of the village as 687 people in 199 households.
