= 2013 Laghman earthquake =

Earthquake in Afghanistan

- Location within Afghanistan
- UTC time: 2013-04-24 09:25
- ISC event: 602880349
- USGS-ANSS: ComCat
- Local date: April 24, 2013
- Local time: 14:25 PKT
- Magnitude: 5.6 M_{w}
- Depth: 63.8 km (39.6 mi)
- Epicenter: 34.508177°N 70.16328°E
- Areas affected: Afghanistan; Pakistan; India
- Total damage: 345 homes damaged
- Max. intensity: MMI V (Moderate)
- Casualties: 18 dead, 130 injured

The 2013 Laghman earthquake occurred with magnitude of 5.6, with an epicenter 11 km (seven miles) from Mihtarlam, the capital of Afghanistan's eastern province of Laghman Province near Jalalabad at 09:25 UTC on April 24. The quake occurred below the surface at a moderate depth of 63.8 km. The tremors were also felt in neighboring Pakistan and India.

Earthquake tremors were felt across Pakistan including in Parachinar, Mohmad Agency, Shabqadar, Swat, Peshawar, Islamabad, Chiniot and Lahore.

== Damage and casualties ==
- Nangarhar Province: 17 dead, 126 injured, 300 homes damaged
- Kunar Province: 1 dead, 4 injured, 45 homes damaged

== See also ==
- List of earthquakes in 2013
- List of earthquakes in Afghanistan
