= Kulul, California =

Former Native American settlement in California

Kulul is a former Costanoan settlement in Monterey County, California, United States. Its precise location is unknown.
