= Kaki Rural District =

Rural district in Bushehr province, Iran

Kaki Rural District Persian: دهستان كاكي
- Rural District
- Location within Iran
- Coordinates: 28°17′N 51°34′E
- Country: Iran
- Province: Bushehr
- County: Dashti
- District: Kaki
- Established: 1986
- Capital: Kaki

Population (2016)
  - Total: 2,898
- Time zone: UTC+3:30 (IRST)

Kaki Rural District (Persian: دهستان كاكي) is in Kaki District of Dashti County, Bushehr province, Iran. It is administered from the city of Kaki.

== Demographics ==
=== Population ===
At the time of the 2006 National Census, the rural district's population was 2,664 in 530 households. There were 2,644 inhabitants in 680 households at the following census of 2011. The 2016 census measured the population of the rural district as 2,898 in 821 households. The most populous of its 25 villages was Boniad, with 819 people.

=== Other villages in the rural district ===
- Gankhak-e Kowra
- Gankhak-e Sheykhi
- Talkhu
