= Cheghapur Rural District =

Rural district in Bushehr province, Iran

Cheghapur Rural District Persian: دهستان چغاپور
- Rural District
- Location within Iran
- Coordinates: 28°24′N 51°29′E
- Country: Iran
- Province: Bushehr
- County: Dashti
- District: Kaki
- Established: 1986
- Capital: Baduleh

Population (2016)
  - Total: 1,581
- Time zone: UTC+3:30 (IRST)

Cheghapur Rural District (Persian: دهستان چغاپور) is in Kaki District of Dashti County, Bushehr province, Iran. It is administered from the city of Baduleh.

== Demographics ==
=== Population ===
At the time of the 2006 National Census, the rural district's population was 5,391 in 1,113 households. There were 5,261 inhabitants in 1,331 households at the following census of 2011. The 2016 census measured the population of the rural district as 1,581 in 485 households. The most populous of its 28 villages was Ba Monir, with 417 people.

=== Other villages in the rural district ===
- Gaz Deraz
- Hoseyn-e Zaeri
- Naseri
