= 2013 Borazjan earthquake =

Earthquake in Iran

2013 Dashtestan earthquake
- Location within Iran
- UTC time: 2013-11-28 13:51:34
- ISC event: 603820291
- USGS-ANSS: ComCat
- Local date: November 28, 2013
- Local time: 17:21 IRDT (UTC+03:30)
- Magnitude: 5.8 M_{w}
- Depth: 8.0 km (5.0 mi)
- Epicenter: 29.363°N 51.314°E
- Areas affected: Borazjan, Iran
- Max. intensity: MMI VII (Very strong)
- Aftershocks: 39
- Casualties: 7 dead, 66 injured

The 2013 Dashtestan earthquake struck near the city of Borazjan (the capital of Dashtestan County, Bushehr province) in southern Iran on November 28 at a depth of 8.0 km (5.0 mi). The shock had a moment magnitude of 5.8 on the Richter scale and a maximum perceived intensity of VII (Very strong) on the Mercalli intensity scale. The earthquake killed at least 7 people and injured 45 others.

== See also ==
- List of earthquakes in 2013
- List of earthquakes in Iran
