= Kolol, Dashti =

Village in Bushehr province, Iran

Kolol Persian: كلل
- Village
- Location within Iran
- Coordinates: 28°43′32″N 51°14′43″E
- Country: Iran
- Province: Bushehr
- County: Dashti
- District: Central
- Rural District: Khvormuj

Population (2016)
  - Total: 876
- Time zone: UTC+3:30 (IRST)

Kolol (Persian: كلل) (Note: Also romanized as Kolal; also known as Kolal-e Bālā, Kolal-e ‘Olyā, Kolol-e Bālā, and Kulūl) is a village in Khvormuj Rural District of the Central District in Dashti County, Bushehr province, Iran.

== Demographics ==
=== Population ===
At the time of the 2006 National Census, the village's population was 941 in 212 households. The following census in 2011 counted 882 people in 251 households. The 2016 census measured the population of the village as 876 people in 271 households.
