= Khormoj Castle =

Castle in Bushehr Province, Iran

Khormoj castle
- قلعه خورموج
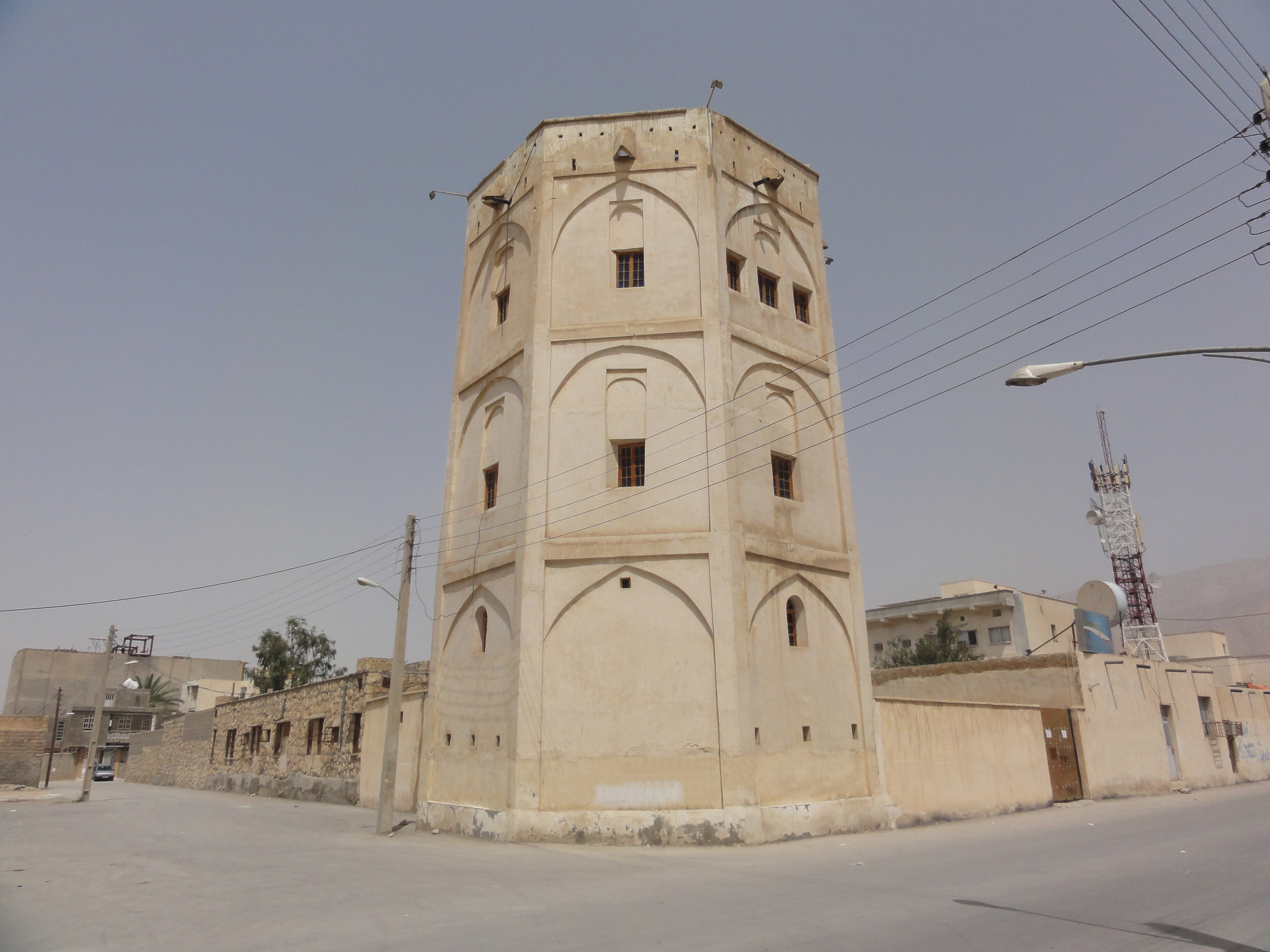
- Interactive map of the Khormoj castle area

General information
- Type: Castle
- Location: Dashti County, Iran

Khormoj castle (Persian: قلعه خورموج) is a historical castle located in Dashti County in Bushehr Province. The longevity of this fortress dates back to the Qajar dynasty.
