= Derazi, Bushehr =

Village in Bushehr province, Iran

Derazi Persian: درازي
- Village
- Location within Iran
- Coordinates: 28°37′34″N 51°14′18″E
- Country: Iran
- Province: Bushehr
- County: Dashti
- District: Central
- Rural District: Khvormuj

Population (2016)
  - Total: 892
- Time zone: UTC+3:30 (IRST)

Derazi (Persian: درازي) (Note: Also romanized as Derāzī; also known as Bunneh Darāzi and Bunneh-ye Darājī) is a village in, and the capital of, Khvormuj Rural District in the Central District of Dashti County, Bushehr province, Iran.

== Demographics ==
=== Population ===
At the time of the 2006 National Census, the village's population was 857 in 221 households. The following census in 2011 counted 1,070 people in 321 households. The 2016 census measured the population of the village as 892 people in 300 households. It was the most populous village in its rural district.
