= 2013 Bushehr earthquake =

6.3 magnitude earthquake in Iran

- Location within Iran
- UTC time: 2013-04-09 11:52:49
- ISC event: 607304565
- USGS-ANSS: ComCat
- Local date: April 9, 2013
- Local time: 16:22 IRDT
- Magnitude: 6.3 M_{w}
- Depth: 10.0 km (6.2 mi)
- Epicenter: 28.48°N 51.58°E
- Areas affected: Iran
- Max. intensity: MMI VIII (Severe)
- Aftershocks: 282, largest is 5.4 M_{w}
- Casualties: 37 dead, 850 injured

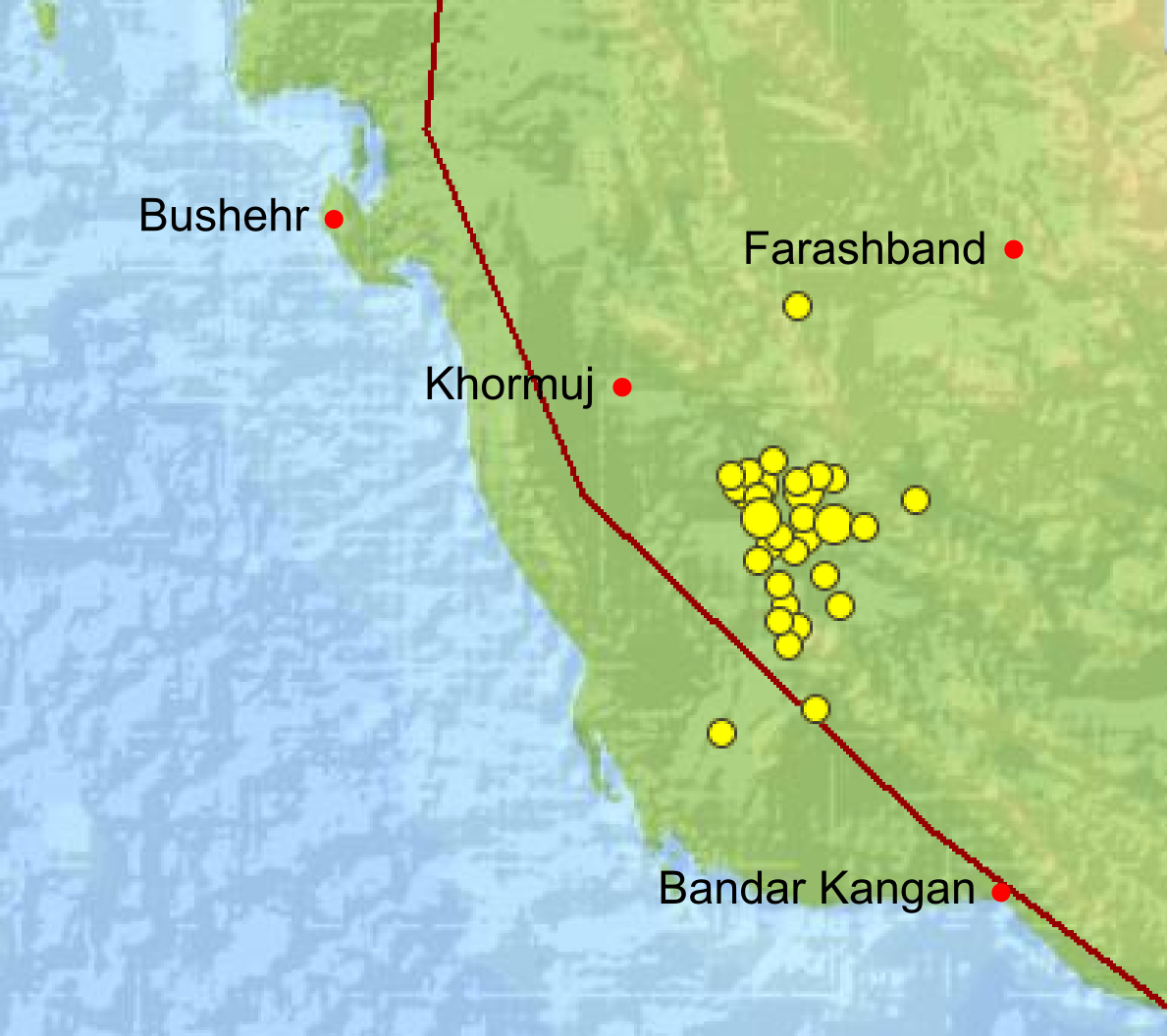
Location of aftershocks in the first four days after the mainshock

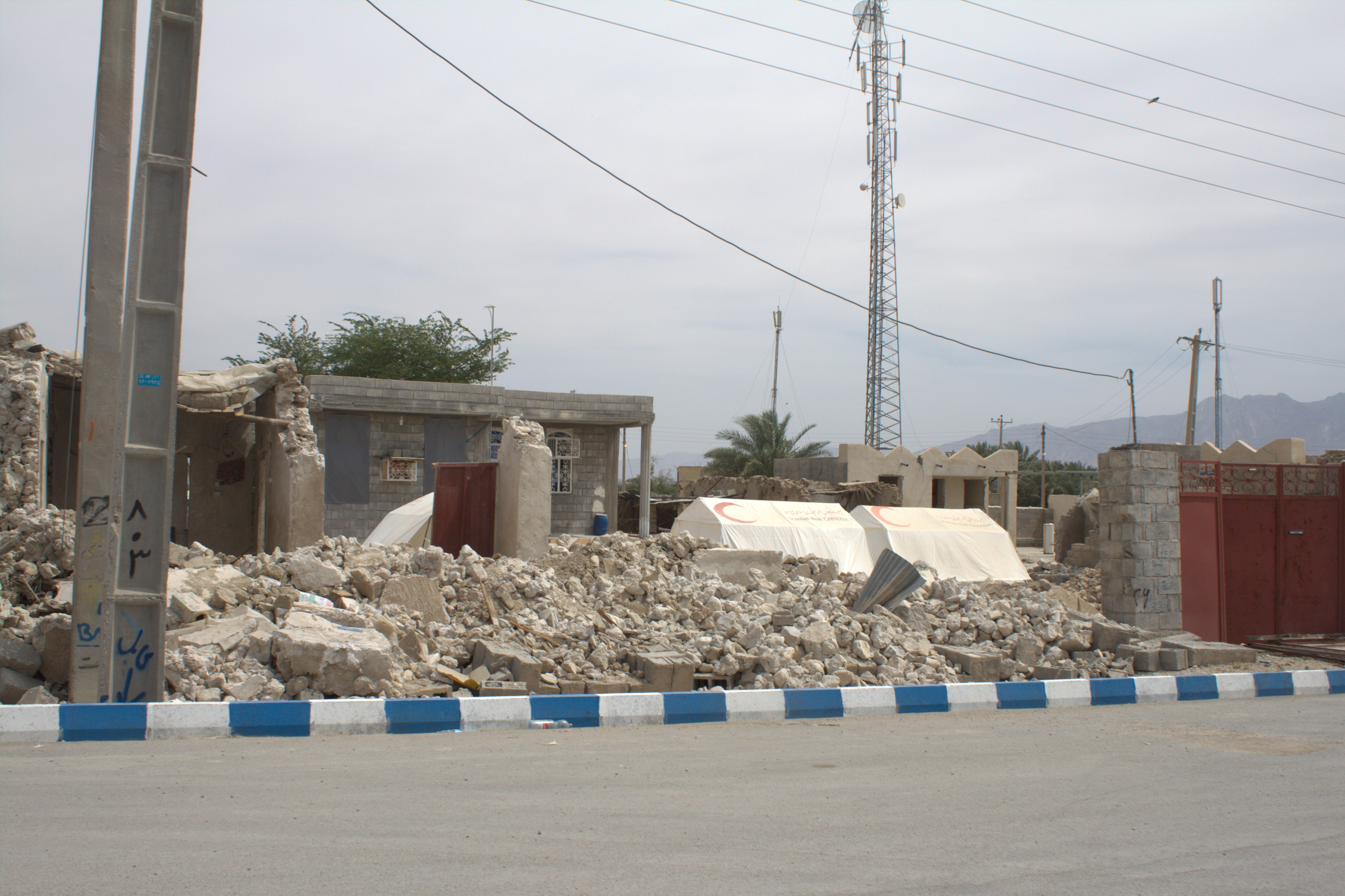
Damage to houses caused by the earthquake, showing tents provided by the Red Crescent

The 2013 Bushehr earthquake occurred with a moment magnitude of 6.3 on April 9 in Iran. The shock's epicenter was in the province of Bushehr, near the city of Khvormuj and the towns of Kaki and Shonbeh. At least 37 people were killed, mostly from the town of Shonbeh and villages of Shonbeh-Tasuj district, and an estimated 850 people were injured.

== Tectonic setting ==
Iran lies within the complex zone of collision between the Arabian plate and the Eurasian plate. The rate of convergence between the plates near the epicentre is about 30 millimetres (1 in) per year, of which only part is taken up within the Zagros fold and thrust belt. The earthquake was the result of thrust faulting on a NW-SE trending fault plane, consistent with continuing shortening of the Arabian plate.

== Earthquake ==
At 16:22 IRDT (11:52 UTC) on April 9, 2013, an earthquake with a magnitude of 6.3 struck the southwestern coast of Iran, in Bushehr province. It struck at a depth of 10 kilometres (6.2 mi), near the towns of Khvormuj and Kaki. A total of 282 of aftershocks followed, most within the first hour of the main quake. The strongest aftershock had a magnitude of 5.4.

The area is home to ten thousand people and fifty villages. The United States Geological Survey (USGS) estimated that 80,000 people experienced strong tremors while several million felt light shaking. The earthquake was felt in many countries around the Persian Gulf, including Qatar, Bahrain, Saudi Arabia, and the United Arab Emirates.

== Damage ==
At least 37 people were killed and an estimated 850 were injured by the earthquake. Most of those killed were in the town of Shonbeh and villages of Shonbeh-Tasuj District. Of the injured, 100 required hospitalization.

Two villages in the Khvormuj district were reported to have been "levelled". Landslides caused by the earthquake were reported in Kaki City. According to provincial governor Fereydun Hasanvand, 700 homes were damaged, affecting 200 families. Many residents in the Shonbeh District lost power and water services. Residents took to the streets in search of safety as aftershock after aftershock hit. A report by Iran's International Institute of Earthquake Engineering and Seismology stated that most of the buildings damaged were adobe buildings constructed in the last 50 years; and that 100 houses were destroyed, 1,000 people were left homeless, and that about $50 million in damage occurred. In April 10, the largest aftershock with a magnitude of 5.4 injured four people and destroyed buildings already weakened by the mainshock the day prior.

The Bushehr Nuclear Power Plant was not damaged, according to its operator and the governor of the province. It was built to withstand a magnitude 8 earthquake, according to an official.

== Aftermath ==
Iran's Red Crescent Society and the Iranian Navy sent teams to Bushehr Province on the first night to deliver first aid. Several helicopters from nearby provinces helped airlift in emergency supplies. Temporary shelters were erected in the first week after the earthquake.

Three days of national mourning were announced on April 9.

== See also ==
- List of earthquakes in 2013
- List of earthquakes in Iran
