= Kordovan-e Sofla =

Village in Bushehr province, Iran

Kordovan-e Sofla Persian: كردوان سفلي
- Village
- Location within Iran
- Coordinates: 28°10′11″N 51°24′30″E
- Country: Iran
- Province: Bushehr
- County: Dashti
- District: Kaki
- Rural District: Kabgan

Population (2016)
  - Total: 509
- Time zone: UTC+3:30 (IRST)

Kordovan-e Sofla (Persian: كردوان سفلي) (Note: Also romanized as Kordovān-e Soflá; also known as Kardovan, Kerdevān-e Pā’īn, Kordavān, Kordavān-e Pā’īn, Kordovān-e Pā’īn, Kurdavān Ahshām Saiyid, and Kūrdevān-e Ashām Seyyedī) is a village in Kabgan Rural District of Kaki District in Dashti County, Bushehr province, Iran.

== Demographics ==
=== Population ===
At the time of the 2006 National Census, the village's population was 565 in 142 households. The following census in 2011 counted 568 people in 165 households. The 2016 census measured the population of the village as 509 people in 160 households.
