= March 2013 Nantou earthquake =

Earthquake in central Taiwan

- Location within Taiwan
- UTC time: 2013-03-27 02:03
- ISC event: 602751080
- USGS-ANSS: ComCat
- Local date: March 27, 2013
- Local time: 10:03
- Magnitude: 5.9 M_{w}
- Depth: 19.4 kilometres (12 mi)
- Epicenter: 23.90°N 121.07°E
- Areas affected: Taiwan (Nantou County, Taichung, Changhua County)
- Max. intensity: MMI V (Moderate)
- Casualties: 1 dead, 97 injured

The 2013 Nantou earthquake struck central Taiwan with a moment magnitude of 5.9 and a maximum Mercalli intensity of V (Moderate) on March 27 at 10:03 a.m. local time. The epicenter was located in mountainous terrain in Ren'ai Township, Nantou County, Taiwan, not far from Sun Moon Lake.

== Damage ==
News reports indicate that a 72-year-old woman was killed by being crushed by a collapsing wall and 97 people were injured. Most of the injuries were in Taichung. The earthquake caused two fires and stopped five elevators, trapping people inside. This earthquake could be felt in Hong Kong, Fujian, and Zhejiang, China.

== Cause ==
Kuo Kai-wen, director of the ROC Central Weather Bureau Seismological Center (地震測報中心) said on 27 March 2013 that a 100-km long blind fault probably exists at Ren-ai Township in Nantou County.

== Reactions ==
=== Inside Taiwan ===
ROC President Ma Ying-jeou visited the Central Emergency Operation Center on 27 March 2013 urging the people to stay alert for any after shock and ready for any emergency situation.

ROC Premier Jiang Yi-huah initiated a cabinet emergency task force to work with the relevant agencies to respond to the earthquake situation. He also urged the relevant government agencies to reassess the safety standard for any local infrastructure buildings.

=== Outside Taiwan ===
- PRC—ARATS expressed their concern to the earthquake damage and called for continued communication for any new development after the quake.
- Japan—Sumio Tarui, representative of Japan's Interchange Association sent his sympathy, expressing his condolences to the deceased and best wishes to the injured.

== See also ==
- List of earthquakes in 2013
- List of earthquakes in Taiwan
