= Khvormuj Rural District =

Rural district in Bushehr province, Iran

Khvormuj Rural District Persian: دهستان خورموج
- Rural District
- Location within Iran
- Coordinates: 28°34′N 51°16′E
- Country: Iran
- Province: Bushehr
- County: Dashti
- District: Central
- Established: 1986
- Capital: Derazi

Population (2016)
  - Total: 4,549
- Time zone: UTC+3:30 (IRST)

Khvormuj Rural District (Persian: دهستان خورموج) is in the Central District of Dashti County, Bushehr province, Iran. Its capital is the village of Derazi.

== Demographics ==
=== Population ===
At the time of the 2006 National Census, the rural district's population was 4,181 in 986 households. There were 4,486 inhabitants in 1,297 households at the following census of 2011. The 2016 census measured the population of the rural district as 4,549 in 1,454 households. The most populous of its 14 villages was Derazi, with 892 people.

=== Other villages in the rural district ===
- Charak
- Chavoshi
- Kolol
