= List of earthquakes in 2013 =

Earthquakes in 2013
Approximate epicenters of notable earthquakes in 2013
- 4.0–5.9 magnitude
- 6.0–6.9 magnitude
- 7.0–7.9 magnitude
- 8.0+ magnitude
- Strongest: 8.3 M_{w} Russia
- Deadliest: 7.7 M_{w} Pakistan; 825 deaths
- Total fatalities: 1,538

Number by magnitude
- 9.0+: 0
- 8.0–8.9: 2
- 7.0–7.9: 17
- 6.0–6.9: 124
- 5.0–5.9: 1,402

This is a list of earthquakes in 2013. Only earthquakes of magnitude 6 or above are included, unless they result in damage and/or casualties, or are notable for some other reason. All dates are listed according to UTC time. This year was quite busy with 17 events above magnitude 7 and two above magnitude 8, in Kamchatka and Santa Cruz Islands. Deadly quakes struck Pakistan, Philippines, China and Iran.

== Compared to other years ==
Number of earthquakes worldwide for 2003–2013 []
| Magnitude | 2003 | 2004 | 2005 | 2006 | 2007 | 2008 | 2009 | 2010 | 2011 | 2012 | 2013 |
|---|---|---|---|---|---|---|---|---|---|---|---|
| 8.0–9.9 | 1 | 2 | 1 | 2 | 4 | 1 | 1 | 1 | 1 | 2 | 2 |
| 7.0–7.9 | 14 | 14 | 10 | 9 | 14 | 12 | 16 | 23 | 19 | 15 | 17 |
| 6.0–6.9 | 139 | 141 | 139 | 142 | 178 | 167 | 143 | 150 | 187 | 117 | 123 |
| 5.0–5.9 | 1,212 | 1,511 | 1,694 | 1,726 | 2,090 | 1,786 | 1,912 | 2,222 | 2,494 | 1,565 | 1,469 |
| 4.0–4.9 | 8,455 | 10,880 | 13,893 | 12,843 | 12,081 | 12,294 | 6,817 | 10,135 | 13,130 | 10,955 | 11,877 |
| Total | 9,823 | 12,551 | 15,738 | 14,723 | 14,367 | 14,261 | 8,891 | 12,536 | 15,831 | 12,660 | 13,491 |

== By death toll ==
| Rank | Death toll | Magnitude | Location | MMI | Depth (km) | Date |
|---|---|---|---|---|---|---|
| 1 | 825 | 7.7 | Pakistan, Balochistan | IX (Violent) | 20.0 | September 24 |
| 2 | 222 | 7.1 | Philippines, Central Visayas | IX (Violent) | 19.0 | October 15 |
| 3 | 216 | 6.6 | China, Sichuan | VIII (Severe) | 12.0 | April 20 |
| 4 | 95 | 5.9 | China, Gansu | VII (Very strong) | 20.0 | July 22 |
| 5 | 43 | 6.1 | Indonesia, Sumatra | VIII (Severe) | 10.0 | July 2 |
| 6 | 40 | 6.3 | Iran, Bushehr | VIII (Severe) | 10.0 | April 9 |
| 7 | 35 | 7.7 | Iran, Sistan and Baluchestan | VII (Very strong) | 82.0 | April 16 |
| 8 | 22 | 6.8 | Pakistan, Balochistan | VIII (Severe) | 14.8 | September 28 |
| 9 | 18 | 5.6 | Afghanistan, Laghman | V (Moderate) | 62.0 | April 24 |
| 10 | 13 | 8.0 | Solomon Islands | VIII (Severe) | 29.0 | February 6 |

- Note: At least 10 dead

== By magnitude ==
| Rank | Magnitude | Death toll | Location | Depth (km) | MMI | Date |
|---|---|---|---|---|---|---|
| 1 | 8.3 | 0 | Russia, offshore Sea of Okhotsk | 608.9 | V (Moderate) | May 24 |
| 2 | 8.0 | 13 | Solomon Islands, Santa Cruz Islands offshore | 29.0 | VIII (Severe) | February 7 |
| 3 | 7.7 | 35 | Iran, Sistan and Baluchestan | 82.0 | VIII (Severe) | April 16 |
| 3 | 7.7 | 825 | Pakistan, Balochistan | 20.0 | IX (Violent) | September 24 |
| 3 | 7.7 | 0 | Antarctica, Coronation Island offshore | 10.0 | VIII (Severe) | November 17 |
| 6 | 7.5 | 0 | United States, Alaska offshore | 9.9 | V (Moderate) | January 5 |
| 7 | 7.4 | 0 | Tonga, Tongatapu offshore | 171.4 | VI (Strong) | May 23 |
| 8 | 7.3 | 0 | Papua New Guinea, New Ireland offshore | 386.3 | IV (Light) | July 7 |
| 8 | 7.3 | 0 | South Georgia and the South Sandwich Islands offshore | 31.3 | VI (Strong) | July 15 |
| 10 | 7.2 | 0 | Russia, offshore Kuril Islands | 123.3 | VII (Very strong) | April 19 |
| 11 | 7.1 | 0 | Solomon Islands, Santa Cruz Islands offshore | 10.1 | VI (Strong) | February 6 |
| 11 | 7.1 | 0 | Solomon Islands, Santa Cruz Islands offshore | 21.0 | VII (Very strong) | February 8 |
| 11 | 7.1 | 3 | Peru, Arequipa offshore | 40.0 | VIII (Severe) | September 25 |
| 11 | 7.1 | 222 | Philippines, Central Visayas | 19.0 | IX (Violent) | October 15 |
| 11 | 7.1 | 0 | Japan, Fukushima offshore | 26.1 | IV (Light) | October 25 |
| 16 | 7.0 | 0 | Solomon Islands, Santa Cruz Islands offshore | 10.1 | VII (Very strong) | February 6 |
| 16 | 7.0 | 3 | Indonesia, Papua | 66.0 | VII (Very strong) | April 6 |
| 16 | 7.0 | 0 | United States, Alaska offshore | 33.5 | VI (Strong) | August 30 |
| 16 | 7.0 | 0 | Falkland Islands offshore | 10.0 | I (Not felt) | November 25 |

- Note: At least 7.0 magnitude

== By month ==
=== January ===
January
- Strongest: 7.5 M_{w} Alaska
- Deadliest: 6.8 M_{w} Chile; 1 death 6.1 M_{w} Indonesia; 1 death
- Total fatalities: 2

Number by magnitude
- 7.0–7.9: 1
- 6.0–6.9: 6
- 5.0–5.9: 99

- A magnitude 7.5 earthquake struck off the coast of southeast Alaska on January 5 at a depth of 9.9 km (6.2 mi).
- A magnitude 5.4 earthquake struck Western Iran on January 12 at a depth of 4.1 km (2.5 mi). One person injured and many homes damaged in the Boldaji area.
- A magnitude 6.1 earthquake struck the Pacific-Antarctic Ridge on January 15 at a depth of 10 km (6.2 mi).
- A magnitude 5.4 earthquake struck Qinghai, China on January 18 at a depth of 8.0 km (5.0 mi). One person injured and 3,000 buildings damaged near the epicenter.
- (Indonesia) A magnitude 6.1 earthquake struck northern Sumatra, on January 21 at depth of 12 km (7.5 mi), killing one person, injuring 15 others, and damaging 71 buildings.
- A magnitude 6.1 earthquake struck Kegen, Kazakhstan on January 28 at a depth of 10 km (6.2 mi). No damage was reported in Kazakhstan, but at least 156 houses were destroyed and 636 others were damaged in Kyrgyzstan, while in Xinjiang, China, 216 houses collapsed and 7,458 buildings were damaged.
- A magnitude 6.8 earthquake struck north-central Chile on January 30 at a depth of 45.7 km (28.4 mi). One person died of a heart attack, windows broke, rockfalls occurred and some walls were damaged or collapsed in Vallenar and in Copiapo.
- (Solomon Islands) A magnitude 6.0 earthquake struck the Santa Cruz Islands on January 30 at a depth of 10 km (6.2 mi).
- (Solomon Islands) A magnitude 6.2 earthquake struck the Santa Cruz Islands on January 31 at a depth of 9.2 km (5.7 mi).

=== February ===
February
- Strongest: 8.0 M_{w} Solomon Islands
- Deadliest: 8.0 M_{w} Solomon Islands; 13 deaths
- Total fatalities: 13

Number by magnitude
- 8.0–8.9: 1
- 7.0–7.9: 3
- 6.0–6.9: 18
- 5.0–5.9: 241

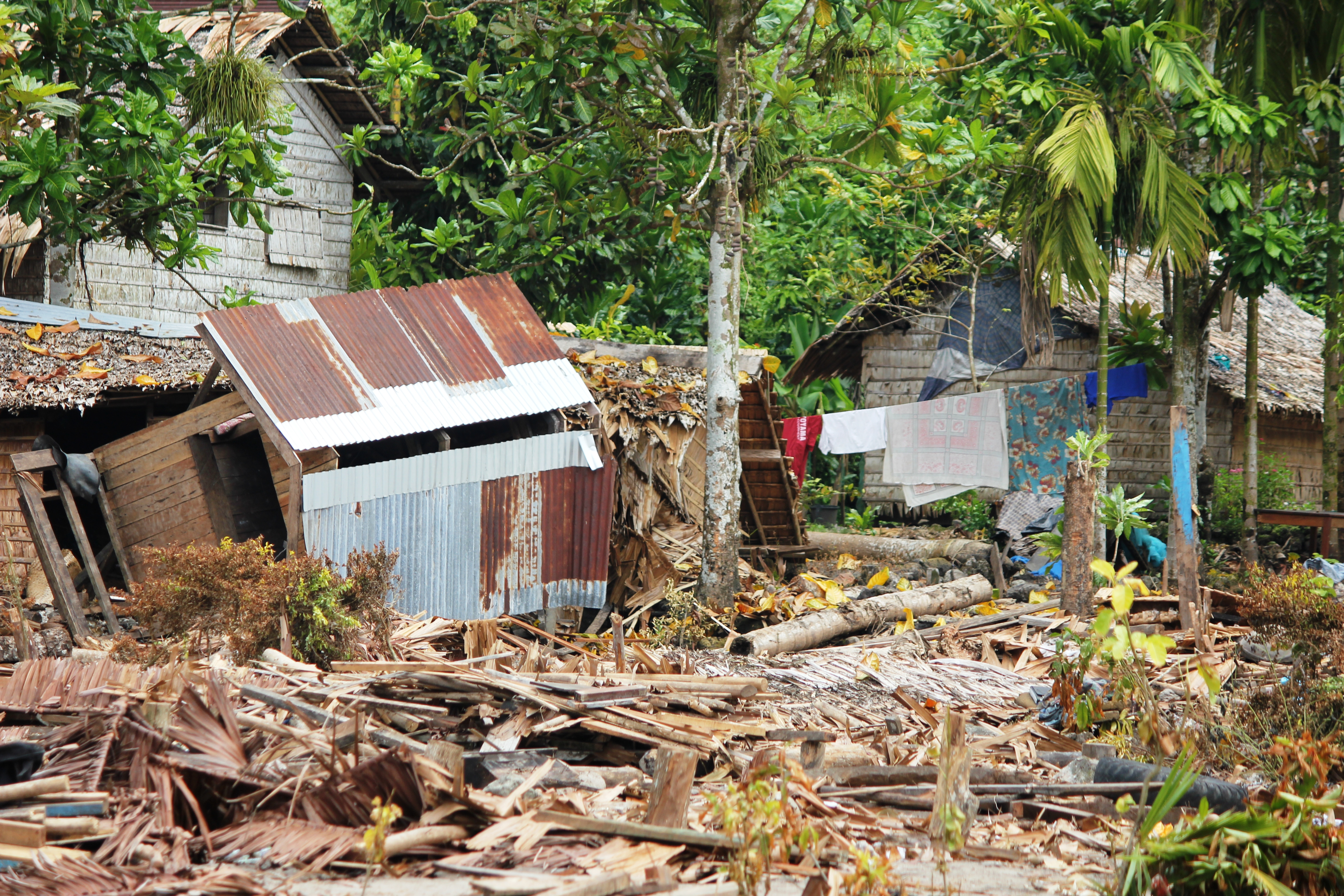
Tsunami damage in Venga village in Solomon Islands by the earthquake.

- Note: A number of large aftershocks were recorded following the 2013 Solomon Islands earthquake, Which had a magnitude of 8.0 on February 6. In order to eliminate cluttering, only aftershocks above M_{w} 6.5 will be included.
- (Solomon Islands) A magnitude 6.0 earthquake struck the Santa Cruz Islands on February 1, at a depth of 9.3 km.
- (Solomon Islands) A magnitude 6.3 earthquake struck the Santa Cruz Islands on February 1, at a depth of 19.9 km.
- (Solomon Islands) A magnitude 6.4 earthquake struck the Santa Cruz Islands on February 1, at a depth of 22 km.
- A magnitude 6.9 earthquake struck Hokkaido, Japan on February 2, at a depth of 107 km. Thirteen people were slightly injured, and some damage was caused in Kushiro and Obihiro.
- (Solomon Islands) A magnitude 6.1 earthquake struck Santa Cruz Islands on February 2, at a depth of 10 km.
- (Solomon Islands) A magnitude 6.3 earthquake struck Santa Cruz Islands on February 6, at a depth of 10 km.
- (Solomon Islands) A magnitude 8.0 earthquake struck Santa Cruz Islands on February 6, at a depth of 28.7 km. The earthquake generated an 11 m (36 ft) tsunami, which destroyed several coastal villages, killing at least 13.
- (Solomon Islands) A magnitude 7.1 earthquake struck Santa Cruz Islands on February 6, at a depth of 10.1 km.
- (Solomon Islands) A magnitude 7.0 earthquake struck Santa Cruz Islands on February 6, at a depth of 10.1 km.
- (Solomon Islands) A magnitude 6.6 earthquake struck Santa Cruz Islands on February 7, at a depth of 10 km.
- (Solomon Islands) A magnitude 6.8 earthquake struck Santa Cruz Islands on February 8, at a depth of 18 km.
- (Solomon Islands) A magnitude 7.1 earthquake struck Santa Cruz Islands on February 8, at a depth of 21 km.
- A magnitude 6.9 earthquake struck Colombia on February 9 at a depth of 153.8 km. Fifteen people were injured and 82 houses collapsed, with 1,896 others damaged.
- (Solomon Islands) A magnitude 6.6 earthquake struck Santa Cruz Islands on February 9, at a depth of 15.7 km.
- (Russia) A magnitude 6.6 earthquake struck Far Eastern Federal District on February 14, at a depth of 9.9 km.
- A magnitude 6.2 earthquake struck south of Mindanao in the Philippines, at a depth of 98.2 km.
- A magnitude 4.8 earthquake struck Lazio, Italy on February 16 at a depth of 10.7 km (6.6 mi). One person died of a heart-attack and many buildings were damaged.
- A magnitude 4.9 earthquake struck Yunnan, China on February 19 at a depth of 10.0 km (6.2 mi). Eight people injured, two of them seriously, 72 buildings destroyed and 365 others damaged in Qiaojia County.
- A magnitude 4.6 earthquake struck Yunnan, China on February 20 at a depth of 10.0 km (6.2 mi). At least ten buildings destroyed and 851 others damaged in Mojiang Hani Autonomous County.
- A magnitude 6.1 earthquake struck Argentina, at a depth of 585.8 km on February 22.
- A magnitude 5.3 earthquake struck Peru, at a depth of 7.9 km on February 22. At least 31 people were injured, 28 homes collapsed or were left uninhabitable and over 80 others were damaged.

=== March ===
March
- Strongest: 6.5 M_{w} Russia; 6.5 M_{w} Papua New Guinea
- Deadliest: 6.0 M_{w} Taiwan; 1 death
- Total fatalities: 1

Number by magnitude
- 8.0–8.9: 0
- 7.0–7.9: 0
- 6.0–6.9: 7
- 5.0–5.9: 89

- (Russia) A magnitude 6.5 earthquake struck the Kuril Islands on March 1 at a depth of 40.9 km (25.4 mi).
- (Russia) A magnitude 6.5 earthquake struck the Kuril Islands on March 1 at a depth of 31.7 km (19.7 mi).
- (China) A magnitude 5.2 earthquake struck Yunnan on March 3 at a depth of 8.0 km (5.0 mi). Thirty people injured, more than 2,100 homes destroyed, 83,000 others damaged and 140,000 people affected in Eryuan County.
- A magnitude 6.5 earthquake struck Papua New Guinea on March 10 at a depth of 28.9 km (18.0 mi).
- (China) A magnitude 5.4 earthquake struck Xinjiang on March 11 at a depth of 10.0 km (6.2 mi). Ten homes destroyed and 854 others damaged in the Artush area.
- (South Georgia and the South Sandwich Islands) A magnitude 6.1 earthquake struck the South Sandwich Islands on March 19 at a depth of 31.3 km (19.4 mi)
- (Poland) A magnitude 4.7 earthquake struck Lower Silesian Voivodeship on March 19 at a depth of 1.0 km (0.62 mi). Five people injured in a mine and at least 20 buildings damaged in the Polkowice area.
- A magnitude 6.1 earthquake struck Fiji on March 24 at a depth of 10 km (6.2 mi).
- A magnitude 6.2 earthquake struck Guatemala on March 25 at a depth of 189.0 km (117.4 mi).
- A magnitude 6.0 earthquake struck Taiwan on March 27 at a depth of 20.7 km (12.9 mi), killing one person.

=== April ===
April
- Strongest: 7.7 M_{w} Iran
- Deadliest: 6.6 M_{w} China; 216 deaths
- Total fatalities: 315

Number by magnitude
- 8.0–8.9: 0
- 7.0–7.9: 3
- 6.0–6.9: 13
- 5.0–5.9: 129

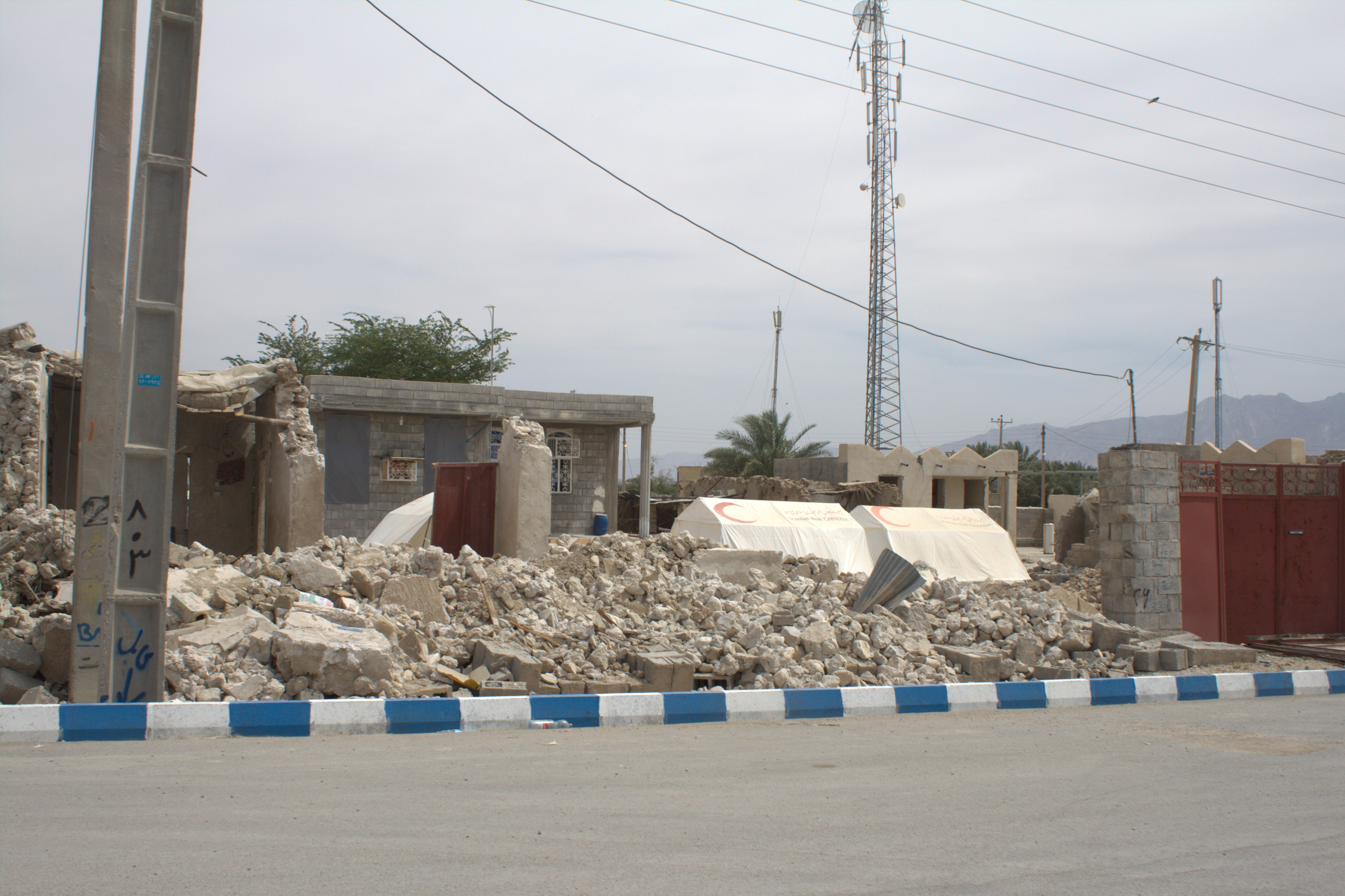
Damage to houses caused by the earthquake in Iran.

- A magnitude 6.0 earthquake struck Japan on April 1 at a depth of 12.5 km (7.8 mi).
- A magnitude 5.3 earthquake struck Afghanistan on April 4 at a depth of 239.5 km (148.8 mi). Three people injured in Peshawar, Pakistan.
- A magnitude 6.3 earthquake struck Russia on April 5 at a depth of 561.9 km (349.1 mi).
- (Indonesia) A magnitude 7.0 earthquake struck Papua on April 6 at a depth of 66 km (41 mi). Three people were killed by landslides in Tolikara Regency.
- A magnitude 6.3 earthquake struck Iran on April 9 at a depth of 10 km (6.2 mi), killing at least 35 people and injuring 850 others.
- A magnitude 5.4 earthquake struck Iran on April 10 at a depth of 15.0 km (9.3 mi). Four people injured and some buildings previously damaged by the event in April 9 were destroyed.
- A magnitude 5.4 earthquake struck Honduras on April 10 at a depth of 3.5 km (2.2 mi). A total of 12 houses were destroyed and 66 others, along with two schools, were damaged. 43 people were evacuated.
- A magnitude 5.8 earthquake struck Japan on April 12 at a depth of 14.0 km (8.7 mi). At least 28 people were injured, 450 houses were damaged and items falling off shelves in stores were reported.
- A magnitude 6.0 earthquake struck Vanuatu on April 13 at a depth of 270.7 km (168.2 mi).
- A magnitude 6.6 earthquake struck Papua New Guinea on April 14 at a depth of 35.3 km (21.9 mi).
- A magnitude 4.4 earthquake struck India on April 16 at a depth of 43.8 km (27.2 mi). One person killed and two injured by a mudslide in the Kalgachia area.
- A magnitude 7.7 earthquake struck Iran on April 16 at a depth of 82 km (51 mi). According to Pakistani authorities, 39 people lost their lives in the Panjgur and Mashkeel areas of Balochistan Province, which borders Iran. One fatality was reported from Iran, while a total of 117 were injured across the two countries.
- A magnitude 6.6 earthquake struck Papua New Guinea on April 16 at a depth of 13 km (8.1 mi).
- (China) A magnitude 5.1 earthquake struck Yunnan on April 17 at a depth of 38.3 km (23.8 mi). Nine people were injured, 276 homes destroyed and many others damaged and more than 12,000 people were evacuated.
- A magnitude 5.6 earthquake struck Japan on April 17 at a depth of 8.8 km (5.5 mi). Three people were injured, some buildings damaged and landslides blocked roads in the Miyakejima area.
- A magnitude 5.9 earthquake struck Japan on April 17 at a depth of 50.5 km (31.4 mi). Two people were injured.
- (Russia) A magnitude 7.2 earthquake struck the Kuril Islands on April 19 at a depth of 122.3 km (76.0 mi).
- (Russia) A magnitude 6.0 earthquake struck south of the Kuril Islands on April 19 at a depth of 18.6 km (11.6 mi).
- (Iran) A magnitude 4.8 earthquake struck East Azerbaijan province on April 18 at a depth of 10.3 km (6.4 mi). Three people were injured in the epicentral area.
- (Indonesia) A magnitude 4.8 earthquake struck Central Java on April 19 at a depth of 9.9 km (6.2 mi). Two people were injured, 34 homes collapsed, 277 others and at least nine buildings damaged and 5,000 people displaced in Banjarnegara Regency.
- (China) A magnitude 6.6 earthquake struck Western Sichuan on April 20 at a depth of 12.3 km (7.6 mi). Over 193 people were killed, 24 are missing, and at least 12,211 were injured, more than 968 of them seriously.
- A magnitude 4.8 earthquake struck Uganda on April 20 at a depth of 10.0 km (6.2 mi). Three homes destroyed in Kibaale District.
- (Russia) A magnitude 6.1 earthquake struck the Kuril Islands on April 20 at a depth of 20.2 km (12.6 mi).
- A magnitude 6.1 earthquake struck Japan on April 21 at a depth of 424.1 km (263.5 mi).
- A magnitude 6.0 earthquake struck western Mexico on April 21 at a depth of 70 km (43 mi). Several homes, a school, a church, and two walkways damaged in Las Guacamayas. Power outages also occurred in Mexico City.
- A magnitude 5.0 earthquake struck China on April 22 at a depth of 27.5 km (17.1 mi). Twelve people injured, nine homes collapsed and 4,012 others were damaged.
- A magnitude 4.4 earthquake struck Hungary on April 22 at a depth of 13.0 km (8.1 mi). Over 4,500 buildings were damaged in the epicentral area, with total losses estimated at $1.5 million.
- A magnitude 6.5 earthquake struck Papua New Guinea on April 23 at a depth of 16.3 km (10.1 mi).
- A magnitude 4.8 earthquake struck Honduras on April 24 at a depth of 10.0 km (6.2 mi). Six people injured, 12 homes destroyed and 580 others were damaged.
- A magnitude 4.5 earthquake struck Iran on April 24 at a depth of 21.3 km (13.2 mi). Three people injured and several homes were damaged in the Golpayegan area.
- A magnitude 5.6 earthquake struck Afghanistan on April 24 at a depth of 40 miles with an epicentre 11 km (6.8 mi) from Mehtar Lam, the capital of the province, 18 people were killed in the tremors and more than 100 were injured.
- (China) A magnitude 5.3 earthquake struck Sichuan on April 24 at a depth of 10.0 km (6.2 mi). One person killed, 72 injured and 29,092 homes damaged or destroyed in the Yibin area.
- (New Zealand) A magnitude 6.2 earthquake struck the Kermadec Islands on April 26 at a depth of 349.0 km (216.9 mi).

=== May ===
May
- Strongest: 8.3 M_{w} Russia
- Deadliest: 5.4 M_{w} India; 3 deaths
- Total fatalities: 5

Number by magnitude
- 8.0–8.9: 1
- 7.0–7.9: 1
- 6.0–6.9: 9
- 5.0–5.9: 120

- A magnitude 5.7 earthquake struck Jammu and Kashmir, India on May 1 at a depth of 15.0 km (9.3 mi). Three people killed, including two by landslides, 90 others injured, 1,200 houses destroyed and 68,800 others damaged in the Doda-Kishtwar area.
- A magnitude 4.2 earthquake struck Mostaganem Province, Algeria on May 2 at a depth of 17.3 km (10.7 mi). Seventeen people injured and several buildings were damaged.
- A magnitude 6.1 earthquake struck the Strait of Hormuz, Iran on May 11 at a depth of 14 km (8.7 mi). Two people, including one child died, 20 others injured, and 70 percent of homes destroyed in 31 villages near the epicenter.
- A magnitude 6.4 earthquake struck Tonga on May 11 at a depth of 205.4 km (127.6 mi).
- A magnitude 4.4 earthquake struck the Fars province, Iran on May 12 at a depth of 14.1 km (8.8 mi). Twelve people injured, five of them seriously, in the Shiraz area.
- A magnitude 6.8 earthquake struck the Northern Mariana Islands on May 14 at a depth of 601.8 km (373.9 mi).
- A magnitude 4.7 earthquake struck Jammu and Kashmir, India on May 14 at a depth of 48.0 km (29.8 mi). One person died of a heart attack while evacuating.
- A magnitude 6.0 earthquake struck offshore Fukushima, Japan on May 18 at a depth of 34 km (21 mi).
- A magnitude 5.0 earthquake struck Algeria, on May 19 at a depth of 10.0 km (6.2 mi). Five people injured and some homes damaged in the Béjaïa area.
- A magnitude 6.4 earthquake struck Aysén, Chile on May 20 at a depth of 10.0 km (6.2 mi).
- A magnitude 6.0 earthquake struck Kamchatka, Russia on May 21 at a depth of 15.1 km (9.4 mi).
- A magnitude 6.0 earthquake struck Kamchatka, Russia on May 21 at a depth of 36.7 km (22.8 mi).
- A magnitude 7.4 earthquake struck Tonga on May 23 at a depth of 171.4 km (106.5 mi).
- A magnitude 6.3 earthquake struck Tonga on May 23 at a depth of 154.1 km (95.8 mi).
- A magnitude 8.3 earthquake struck the Sea of Okhotsk, Russia on May 24 at a depth of 608.9 km (378.4 mi). At least seventeen buildings were damaged in Samara, one of them severely. It was felt 4,000 miles (6,400 km) away in Moscow and as far away as Serbia.
- A magnitude 5.3 earthquake struck Uzbekistan, on May 24 at a depth of 19.2 km (11.9 mi). Several people injured and several buildings destroyed in the Toy-Tepa area.
- A magnitude 6.7 earthquake struck the Sea of Okhotsk, Russia on May 24 at a depth of 623.0 km (387.1 mi).
- A magnitude 5.0 earthquake struck Algeria, on May 26 at a depth of 10.0 km (6.2 mi). Two people injured and several homes and buildings including a mosque damaged in the Béjaïa area.

=== June ===
June
- Strongest: 6.7 M_{w} Christmas Island
- Deadliest: 6.2 M_{w} Taiwan; 4 deaths
- Total fatalities: 5

Number by magnitude
- 8.0–8.9: 0
- 7.0–7.9: 0
- 6.0–6.9: 7
- 5.0–5.9: 78

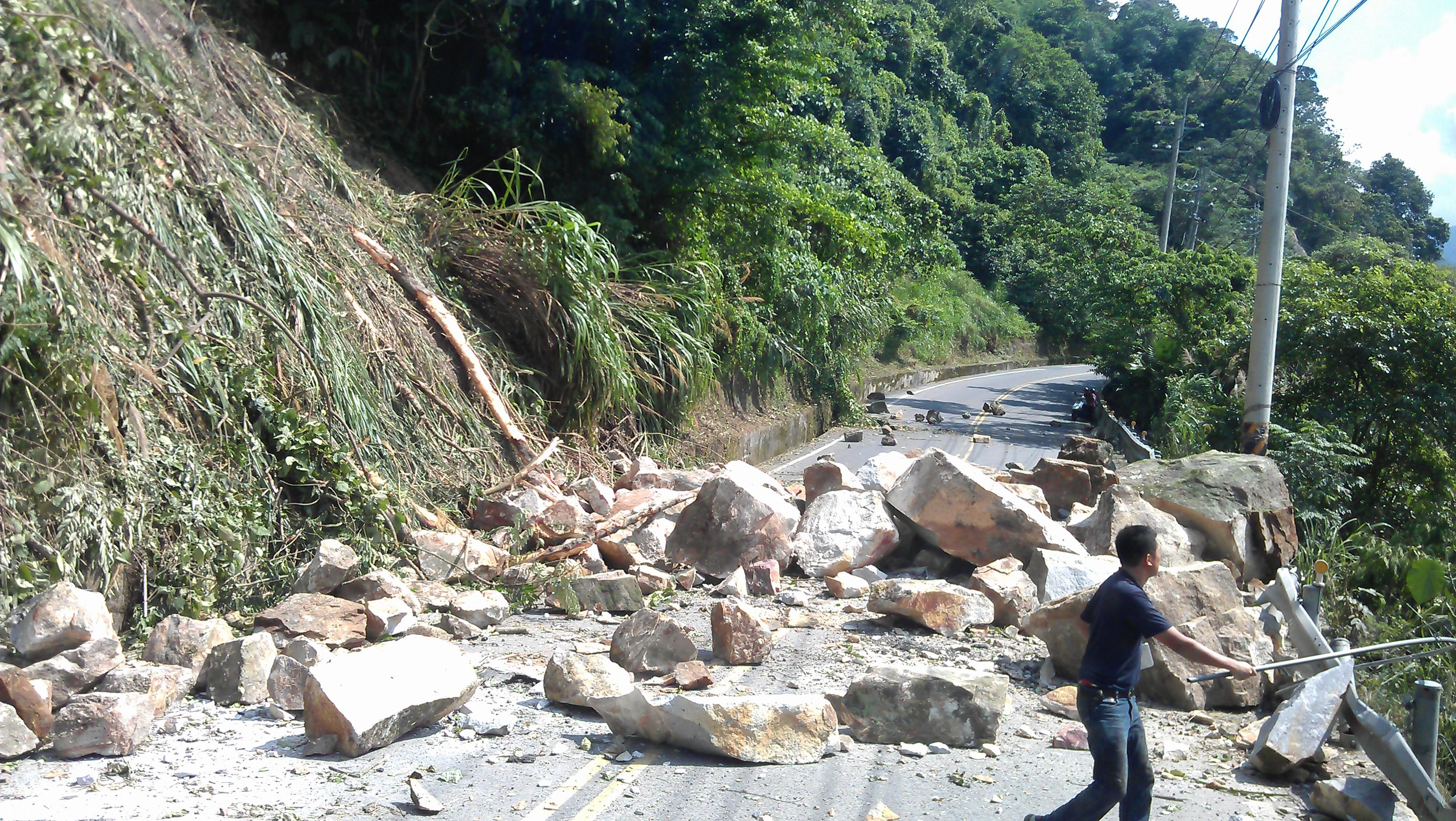
Rock falls on a road in Taiwan due to the earthquake.

- A magnitude 5.6 earthquake struck the Philippines, on June 1 at a depth of 10.0 km (6.2 mi). Thirty-three people injured, 61 homes destroyed, 227 others, 69 buildings and two bridges damaged in the Carmen area.
- A magnitude 6.2 earthquake struck Taiwan, on June 2 at a depth of 20.0 km (12.4 mi), killing 4 people including a mountain climber by falling rocks.
- A magnitude 6.1 earthquake struck the Solomon Islands, on June 5 at a depth of 64.7 km (40.2 mi).
- A magnitude 6.7 earthquake struck 176 km (109 mi) east of Christmas Island, on June 13 at a depth of 9.7 km (6.0 mi).
- A magnitude 6.0 earthquake struck the Kermadec Islands, New Zealand on June 15 at a depth of 172.4 km (107.1 mi).
- A magnitude 6.2 earthquake struck offshore Crete, Greece, on June 15 at a depth of 10.0 km (6.2 mi).
- A magnitude 6.5 earthquake struck Nicaragua, on June 15 at a depth of 35.8 km (22.2 mi). One person died of a heart attack, another person injured, six homes and several buildings were damaged, and telephone outages occurred in León, Chinandega, and Managua departments.
- A magnitude 5.8 earthquake struck Mexico, on June 16 at a depth of 52.0 km (32.3 mi). Two people injured, six homes and a hospital damaged in Huitzuco de los Figueroa; ten homes damaged by landslides and 25 people evacuated in Emiliano Zapata; one home and an auditorium damaged in Chilpancingo; two homes damaged in Iguala and Jiutepec; one mall and some homes damaged in Cuernavaca; one church damaged in Taxco. Power outages occurred in Mexico City. Many landslides blocked roads in the epicentral area.
- A magnitude 5.6 earthquake struck Russia, on June 18 at a depth of 9.9 km (6.2 mi). At least 5,950 buildings were damaged, 350 of them severely.
- A magnitude 4.3 earthquake struck China, on June 22 at a depth of 10.6 km (6.6 mi). Four houses collapsed and 155 others were damaged.
- A magnitude 5.2 earthquake struck Italy, on June 21 at a depth of 5.1 km (3.2 mi). Four people injured, many buildings damaged and 1,000 people displaced across Tuscany, Emilia-Romagna and Liguria.
- A magnitude 5.1 earthquake struck Indonesia, on June 22 at a depth of 46.5 km (28.9 mi). At least 49 people injured and 5,288 homes damaged in the North Lombok Regency.
- A magnitude 4.7 earthquake struck Italy, on June 23 at a depth of 10.1 km (6.3 mi). Four people injured, several buildings affected by the 5.2 event in June 21 were destroyed and landslides occurred in the epicentral area.
- A magnitude 6.6 earthquake struck the Mid-Atlantic Ridge, on June 24 at a depth of 10.0 km (6.2 mi).
- A magnitude 5.0 earthquake struck Nepal, on June 28 at a depth of 24.8 km (15.4 mi). At least 20 people injured and 14 homes damaged in Rukum District.

=== July ===
July
- Strongest: 7.3 M_{w} Papua New Guinea; 7.3 M_{w} South Sandwich Islands
- Deadliest: 5.9 M_{w} China; 95 deaths
- Total fatalities: 138

Number by magnitude
- 8.0–8.9: 0
- 7.0–7.9: 2
- 6.0–6.9: 10
- 5.0–5.9: 72

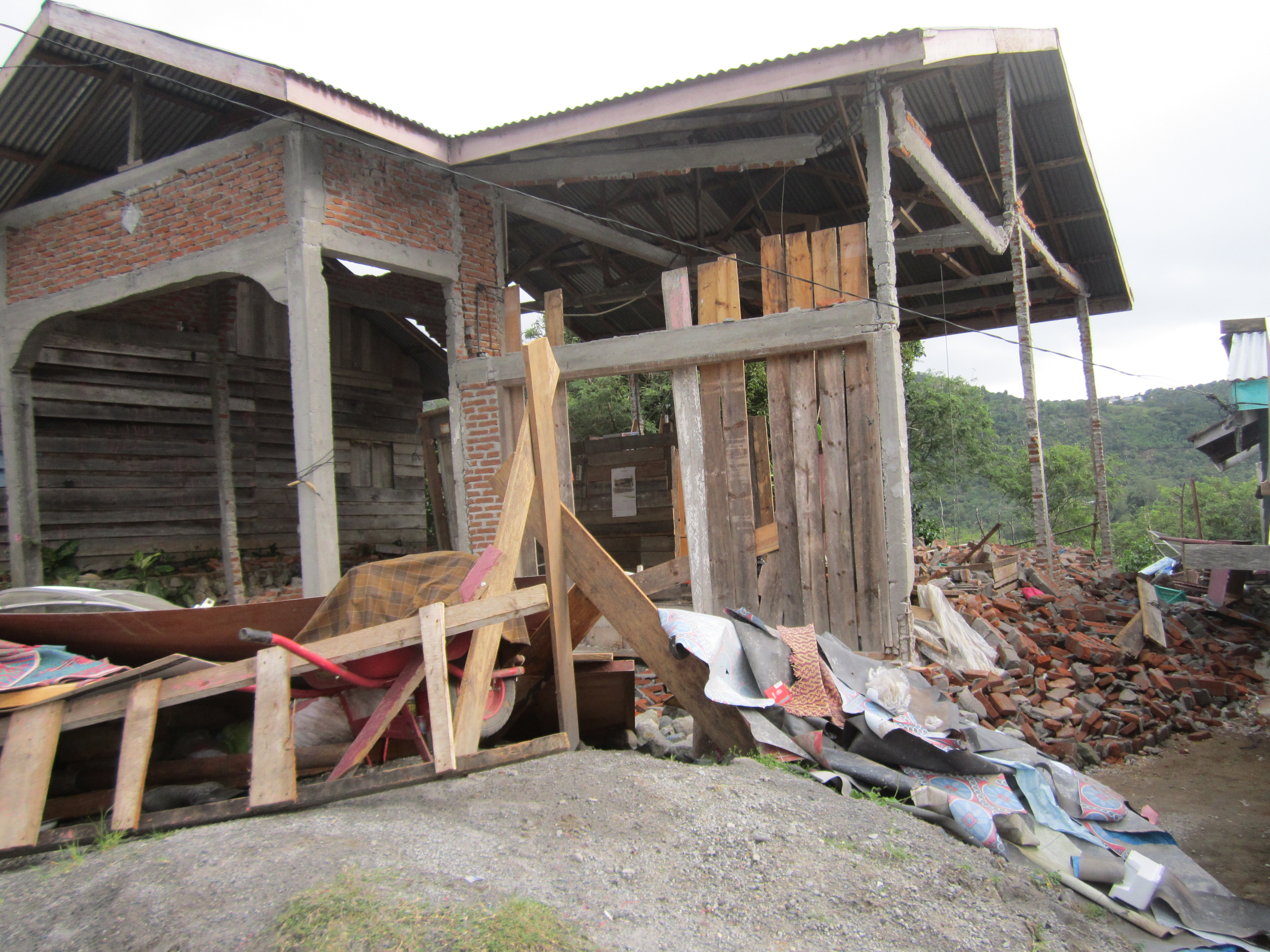
A damaged house by the earthquake in Indonesia.

- A magnitude 6.1 earthquake struck Aceh, Indonesia on July 2 at a depth of 10.0 km (6.2 mi), killing 35 people, leaving 8 missing, and injuring 276.
- A magnitude 6.1 earthquake struck Papua New Guinea, on July 4 at a depth of 72.0 km (44.7 mi).
- A magnitude 6.0 earthquake struck offshore Sumatra, Indonesia, on July 6 at a depth of 19.7 km (12.2 mi).
- A magnitude 7.3 earthquake struck Papua New Guinea, on July 7 at a depth of 386.3 km (240.0 mi).
- A magnitude 6.6 earthquake struck Papua New Guinea, on July 7 at a depth of 62.0 km (38.5 mi).
- A magnitude 5.7 earthquake struck Indonesia, on July 8 at a depth of 60.0 km (37.3 mi). One person injured, 11 homes destroyed and 113 others damaged in the Malang area.
- A magnitude 4.9 earthquake struck Dominican Republic, on July 15 at a depth of 37.7 km (23.4 mi). Four people injured and several buildings damaged in the San Francisco de Macorís area.
- A magnitude 4.7 earthquake struck Indonesia, on July 13 at a depth of 10.0 km (6.2 mi). One person injured and dozens of buildings were damaged in the Kuningan-Brebes area.
- A magnitude 7.3 earthquake struck South Georgia and the South Sandwich Islands, on July 15 at a depth of 31.3 km (19.4 mi).
- A magnitude 6.0 earthquake struck Papua New Guinea, on July 16 at a depth of 44.3 km (27.5 mi).
- A magnitude 6.0 earthquake struck Arequipa, Peru, on July 17 at a depth of 6.6 km (4.1 mi). Three people were injured and 111 houses were destroyed, with 530 others damaged.
- A magnitude 4.8 earthquake struck Algeria, on July 17 at a depth of 9.8 km (6.1 mi). At least 24 people injured and 90 percent of houses were damaged in the Hammam Melouane area.
- A magnitude 4.7 earthquake struck China on July 18 at a depth of 39.4 km (24.5 mi). One person injured and some houses damaged in Lushui County.
- A magnitude 6.5 earthquake struck 20 km (12 mi) east of Seddon, New Zealand on July 21 at a depth of 17 km (11 mi). The earthquake was preceded by a series of foreshocks, including a 5.7 and 5.8. Four people were injured in Wellington 55 km (34 mi) away.
- A magnitude 5.9 earthquake struck southeastern Gansu, China on July 21 at a depth of 9.8 km (6.1 mi). At least 95 people were killed and more than 1,000 others injured, with more than 9,000 houses collapsing.
- (South Africa) A magnitude 6.1 earthquake struck the southwestern Indian Ocean, off of Marion Island in the Prince Edward Islands group, on July 22 at a depth of 10.0 km (6.2 mi).
- A magnitude 4.7 earthquake struck Peru on July 25 at a depth of 18.8 km (11.7 mi). At least three homes destroyed and several others and a school were damaged in Huambo District.
- A magnitude 6.1 earthquake struck Vanuatu, on July 26 at a depth of 132.6 km (82.4 mi).
- A magnitude 6.2 earthquake struck South Georgia and the South Sandwich Islands, on July 26 at a depth of 10.0 km (6.2 mi).
- A magnitude 4.6 earthquake struck Gansu, China on July 28 at a depth of 15.0 km (9.3 mi). Thirty-four people injured, 1,124 houses destroyed, 34,630 others damaged, utilities disrupted and many landslides blocked roads in Wen County.

=== August ===
August
- Strongest: 7.0 M_{w}, Alaska
- Total fatalities: 5

Number by magnitude
- 7.0–7.9: 1
- 6.0–6.9: 9
- 5.0–5.9: 101

- A magnitude 5.2 earthquake struck India, on August 2 at a depth of 42.4 km (26.3 mi). Six people injured, over 100 buildings damaged and utilities disrupted in the Kishtwar area.
- A magnitude 5.8 earthquake struck Japan, on August 4 at a depth of 56.0 km (34.8 mi). Four people injured in the Sendai-Kesennuma area.
- A magnitude 5.3 earthquake struck Greece, on August 6 at a depth of 0.1 km (0.062 mi). Two people injured, more than 300 homes damaged or destroyed and rockfalls blocked roads in the affected areas.
- (Indonesia) A magnitude 6.0 earthquake struck Maluku, on August 12 at a depth of 92.0 km (57.2 mi).
- (New Zealand) A magnitude 6.0 earthquake struck the Kermadec Islands, on August 12 at a depth of 325.2 km (202.1 mi).
- A magnitude 6.1 earthquake struck offshore of Peru, on August 12 at a depth of 10.0 km (6.2 mi).
- A magnitude 6.6 earthquake struck offshore of Colombia, on August 13 at a depth of 12.0 km (7.5 mi).
- A magnitude 5.7 earthquake struck China, on August 13 at a depth of 6.0 km (3.7 mi). Eighty-seven people injured, 992 homes destroyed, 47,120 others damaged, 80 percent of roads and bridges collapsed, and communications were disrupted in 11 counties near the epicenter.
- A magnitude 6.6 earthquake struck Seddon, New Zealand, 70 km (43 mi) south west of the capital Wellington, on August 16 at a depth of 8 km (5 mi). The USGS, however, listed this quake as 6.5. Five people were injured and widespread damage was reported.
- A magnitude 5.2 earthquake struck Mexico, on August 16 at a depth of 21.0 km (13.0 mi). Two people injured and one building collapsed in Mexico City.
- A magnitude 6.1 earthquake struck offshore of Indian Ridge, on August 17 at a depth of 10.0 km (6.2 mi).
- A magnitude 6.2 earthquake struck Mexico, on August 21 at a depth of 20 km (12 mi). Eight people injured and 502 structures damaged in Guerrero. One person injured in Mexico City.
- A magnitude 6.1 earthquake struck northwest of Raoul Island, New Zealand, on August 28 at a depth of 488.6 km (303.6 mi).
- A magnitude 7.0 earthquake struck the Aleutian Islands, Alaska, on August 30 at a depth of 33.5 km (20.8 mi).
- A magnitude 5.2 earthquake struck Yunnan, China, on August 27 at a depth of 10.0 km (6.2 mi). More than 72 homes damaged or destroyed and 4,000 people affected in the Benzilan area. This is a foreshock of the 5.8 event three days later.
- A magnitude 4.8 earthquake struck Colombia, on August 27 at a depth of 81.1 km (50.4 mi). Two homes destroyed, 18 others and two schools damaged in the Dagua area.
- A magnitude 5.8 earthquake struck Yunnan, China, on August 31 at a depth of 9.8 km (6.1 mi). Five people were killed, 24 others were injured, 600 homes destroyed, 55,500 others were damaged, and landslides were reported in the epicenter area.

=== September ===
September
- Strongest: 7.7 M_{w}, Pakistan
- Total fatalities: 851

Number by magnitude
- 7.0–7.9: 2
- 6.0–6.9: 12
- 5.0–5.9: 21

- A magnitude 6.5 earthquake struck Indonesia, on September 1 at a depth of 132.1 km (82.1 mi).
- A magnitude 6.0 earthquake struck British Columbia, Canada, on September 3 at a depth of 5.5 km (3.4 mi).
- A magnitude 6.5 earthquake struck Japan, on September 4 at a depth of 407.0 km (252.9 mi).
- A magnitude 6.5 earthquake struck the Andreanof group of the Aleutian Islands, Alaska, on September 4 at a depth of 39.9 km (24.8 mi).
- A magnitude 6.2 earthquake struck the Andreanof group of the Aleutian Islands, Alaska, on September 4 at a depth of 32.8 km (20.4 mi). This was an aftershock of the 6.5 earthquake.
- A magnitude 6.0 earthquake struck the Mid-Atlantic Ridge, on September 5 at a depth of 10.0 km (6.2 mi).
- (Mexico) A magnitude 6.2 earthquake struck southeast of Ciudad Hidalgo, Chiapas, on September 6 at a depth of 9 km (5.6 mi).
- A magnitude 6.6 earthquake struck Guatemala, on September 7 at a depth of 67.0 km (41.6 mi). One person killed, 50 others injured or hospitalized, 136 homes destroyed, 614 others damaged and 700 people evacuated across Guatemala.
- A magnitude 6.1 earthquake struck the Andreanof group of the Aleutian Islands, Alaska, on September 15 at a depth of 22.3 km (13.9 mi). This was an aftershock of the magnitude 6.5 earthquake on September 4.
- A magnitude 6.1 earthquake struck Indonesia, on September 21 at a depth of 536.8 km (333.6 mi).
- A magnitude 7.7 earthquake struck Pakistan, on September 24 at a depth of 15.0 km (9.3 mi). The earthquake killed 825 people and wounded hundreds more.
- A magnitude 7.1 earthquake struck Peru, on September 25 at a depth of 40.0 km (24.9 mi). The earthquake killed at least 3 people.
- A magnitude 6.8 earthquake struck Awaran, Pakistan, on September 28 at a depth of 14.8 km (9.2 mi) and killed 22 people and injured more than 50.
- (New Zealand) A magnitude 6.5 earthquake struck the Kermadec Islands, on September 30 at a depth of 42.1 km (26.2 mi).

=== October ===
October
- Strongest: 7.1 M_{w}, Philippines
- Total fatalities: 223

Number by magnitude
- 7.0–7.9: 2
- 6.0–6.9: 13
- 5.0–5.9: 114

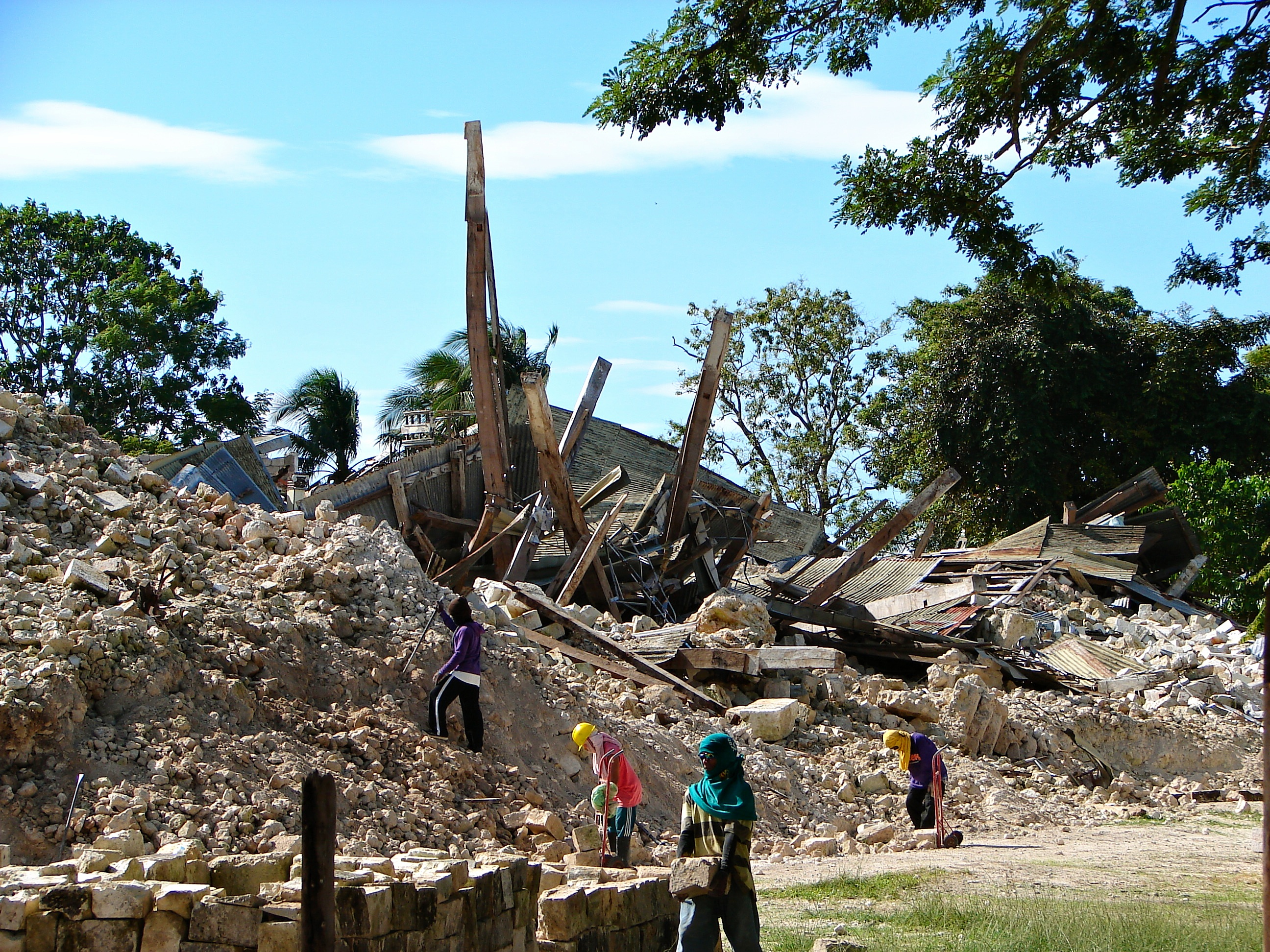
The rubble of the Church of Our Lady of Light in Loon, Bohol, Philippines.

- (Russia) A magnitude 6.7 earthquake struck the Sea of Okhotsk, on October 1 at a depth of 578.2 km (359.3 mi).
- (France) A magnitude 6.4 earthquake struck the Île Amsterdam, on October 4 at a depth of 10.0 km (6.2 mi).
- A magnitude 6.0 earthquake struck the Mariana Islands, on October 6 at a depth of 104.0 km (64.6 mi).
- A magnitude 6.2 earthquake struck Chile, on October 6 at a depth of 10.0 km (6.2 mi).
- (New Zealand) A magnitude 6.3 earthquake struck the Kermadec Islands, on October 12 at a depth of 146.5 km (91.0 mi).
- A magnitude 6.1 earthquake struck Venezuela, on October 12 at a depth of 79.4 km (49.3 mi). Telephone lines were jammed in parts of Trinidad and Tobago.
- A magnitude 6.4 earthquake struck Greece, on October 12 at a depth of 36.2 km (22.5 mi). One person injured and minor damage occurred in the Chania area.
- (China) A magnitude 4.6 earthquake struck Sichuan, on October 14 at a depth of 15.0 km (9.3 mi). One person injured, one home destroyed and some others damaged in Zhaojue County.
- (Indonesia) A magnitude 4.5 earthquake struck Southeast Sulawesi, on October 14 at a depth of 18.5 km (11.5 mi). Two people injured, six homes destroyed and 140 others damaged in Buton Regency.
- A magnitude 7.1 earthquake struck the province of Bohol of the Philippines, on October 15 at a depth of 19.0 km (11.8 mi) below Sagbayan on Bohol Island. The earthquake killed at least 222 people and injured 976.
- (Bolivia) A magnitude 5.0 earthquake struck Santa Cruz Department, on October 15 at a depth of 38.2 km (23.7 mi). Over 440 homes damaged in the epicentral area.
- A magnitude 6.8 earthquake struck Panguna, Papua New Guinea, on October 16 at a depth of 54.1 km (33.6 mi).
- A magnitude 6.5 earthquake struck Mexico, on October 16 at a depth of 11.9 km (7.4 mi).
- (Tunisia) A magnitude 4.4 earthquake struck Monastir Governorate, on October 18 at a depth of 20.2 km (12.6 mi). Five people hospitalized and several buildings damaged in the Monastir area.
- A magnitude 5.3 earthquake struck Indonesia, on October 22 at a depth of 48.3 km (30.0 mi). The earthquake killed an old man, two others people were injured, 159 houses and two religious buildings were damaged.
- A magnitude 6.7 earthquake struck South Georgia and the South Sandwich Islands, on October 24 at a depth of 26.1 km (16.2 mi).
- A magnitude 7.1 earthquake struck Japan, on October 25 at a depth of 26.1 km (16.2 mi). One person slightly injured and a 40 cm (16 in) tsunami was observed.
- A magnitude 5.1 earthquake struck Panama on October 27 at a depth of 49.8 km (30.9 mi). One person injured in Puerto Armuelles.
- A magnitude 6.0 earthquake struck Balleny Islands, on October 29 at a depth of 10.0 km (6.2 mi).
- A magnitude 6.2 earthquake struck Chile, on October 30 at a depth of 17.9 km (11.1 mi).
- (China) A magnitude 5.1 earthquake struck Jilin on October 31 at a depth of 10.7 km (6.6 mi). Thirteen people injured and 4,929 homes damaged in the Songyuan area.
- A magnitude 6.3 earthquake struck Taiwan, on October 31 at a depth of 12.0 km (7.5 mi). Two people injured and seven schools were damaged.

=== November ===
November
- Strongest: 7.7 M_{w}, (Antarctica) Scotia Sea
- Total fatalities: 7

Number by magnitude
- 7.0–7.9: 2
- 6.0–6.9: 8
- 5.0–5.9: 102

- A magnitude 6.6 earthquake struck Chile, on November 1 at a depth of 29.0 km (18.0 mi). Power outages occurred in parts of the Coquimbo Region.
- A magnitude 6.2 earthquake struck Tonga, on November 2 at a depth of 10.0 km (6.2 mi).
- (China) A magnitude 4.7 earthquake struck Jilin on November 3 at a depth of 10.7 km (6.6 mi). Two people were injured and homes damaged by the mainshock on October 31 collapsed in the Songyuan area.
- (India) A magnitude 5.4 earthquake struck Assam on November 6 at a depth of 34.3 km (21.3 mi). Six children injured in the Golaghat area and some buildings were damaged.
- (Tajikistan) A magnitude 5.2 earthquake struck Dushanbe on November 11 at a depth of 23.0 km (14.3 mi). Twelve people injured, 118 homes destroyed and 259 others damaged in the Vahdat area.
- A magnitude 6.6 earthquake struck Russia, on November 12 at a depth of 47.2 km (29.3 mi).
- (Antarctica) A magnitude 6.1 earthquake struck the Scotia Sea, on November 14 at a depth of 10.0 km (6.2 mi).
- (Antarctica) A magnitude 6.8 earthquake struck the Scotia Sea, on November 16 at a depth of 10.0 km (6.2 mi).
- (China) A magnitude 5.4 earthquake struck Yunnan on November 16 at a depth of 26.3 km (16.3 mi). Six homes destroyed and 20,654 others damaged in the Dongchuan area.
- (Antarctica) A magnitude 7.7 earthquake struck the Scotia Sea, on November 17 at a depth of 10.0 km (6.2 mi).
- A magnitude 6.1 earthquake struck Indonesia, on November 19 at a depth of 38.8 km (24.1 mi).
- A magnitude 6.0 earthquake struck Northern Mariana Islands, on November 19 at a depth of 511.0 km (317.5 mi).
- A magnitude 5.3 earthquake struck China, on November 22 at a depth of 10.0 km (6.2 mi). At least 60,000 houses were damaged and 67,000 were evacuated.
- A magnitude 6.5 earthquake struck Fiji, on November 23 at a depth of 377.1 km (234.3 mi).
- (China) A magnitude 5.4 earthquake struck Xinjiang on November 23 at a depth of 7.2 km (4.5 mi). Several houses destroyed in Qiemo County.
- (Turkey) A magnitude 5.1 earthquake struck Bolu Province on November 24 at a depth of 6.0 km (3.7 mi). Fourteen people injured in the Bolu area.
- A magnitude 7.0 earthquake struck the South Atlantic Ocean off the Falkland Islands, on November 25 at a depth of 10.0 km (6.2 mi).
- A magnitude 5.5 earthquake struck Peru on November 25 at a depth of 76.6 km (47.6 mi). One person injured, one wall collapsed, landslides and rockfalls occurred and communication services disrupted in the San Vicente de Cañete-Lima area.
- A magnitude 5.6 earthquake struck Iran, on November 28 at a depth of 16.4 km (10.2 mi). At least 7 people, 203 injured and more than 200 homes and buildings severely damaged in the Borazjan area.
- (China) A magnitude 4.9 earthquake struck Yunnan on November 28 at a depth of 10.0 km (6.2 mi). Twelve people injured and some houses damaged in Midu and Xiangyun counties.

=== December ===
December
- Strongest: 6.4 M_{w}, Indonesia
- Deadliest: 5.1 M_{w}, Italy; 1 death
- Total fatalities: 1

Number by magnitude
- 6.0–6.9: 4
- 5.0–5.9: 111

- (China) A magnitude 5.1 earthquake struck Xinjiang on December 1 at a depth of 7.7 km (4.8 mi). More than 1,256 homes damaged or destroyed in Keping County.
- A magnitude 6.4 earthquake struck Indonesia, on December 1 at a depth of 9.9 km (6.2 mi).
- A magnitude 6.0 earthquake struck Indonesia, on December 1 at a depth of 20.0 km (12.4 mi).
- A magnitude 6.0 earthquake struck Russia, on December 8 at a depth of 28.0 km (17.4 mi).
- (China) A magnitude 5.1 earthquake struck Hubei on December 16 at a depth of 17.8 km (11.1 mi). Six people injured, 105 homes destroyed and 17,528 others damaged in Badong County
- A magnitude 6.2 earthquake struck the Northern Mariana Islands, on December 17 at a depth of 9.0 km (5.6 mi).
- (Indonesia) A magnitude 4.2 earthquake struck West Java on December 18 at a depth of 10.0 km (6.2 mi). Two homes collapsed and 309 damaged in Sukabumi.
- (Italy) A magnitude 5.1 earthquake struck Campania on December 29 at a depth of 10.5 km (6.5 mi). One person died of a heart attack, two others injured and some damage to buildings in the epicentral area.
