= Kabgan Rural District =

Rural district in Bushehr province, Iran

Kabgan Rural District Persian: دهستان كبگان
- Rural District
- Location within Iran
- Coordinates: 28°13′N 51°24′E
- Country: Iran
- Province: Bushehr
- County: Dashti
- District: Kaki
- Established: 1986
- Capital: Ziarat

Population (2016)
  - Total: 4,657
- Time zone: UTC+3:30 (IRST)

Kabgan Rural District (Persian: دهستان كبگان) is in Kaki District of Dashti County, Bushehr province, Iran. Its capital is the village of Ziarat.

== Demographics ==
=== Population ===
At the time of the 2006 National Census, the rural district's population was 4,850 in 1,138 households. There were 5,096 inhabitants in 1,365 households at the following census of 2011. The 2016 census measured the population of the rural district as 4,657 in 1,418 households. The most populous of its 27 villages was Ziarat, with 699 people.

=== Other villages in the rural district ===
- Balangestan
- Kordovan-e Olya,
- Kordovan-e Sofla
- Lavar-e Saheli
