= Kaki District =

District in Bushehr province, Iran

Kaki District Persian: بخش كاكي
- District
- Location within Iran
- Coordinates: 28°18′N 51°29′E
- Country: Iran
- Province: Bushehr
- County: Dashti
- Capital: Kaki

Population (2016)
  - Total: 25,283
- Time zone: UTC+3:30 (IRST)

Kaki District (Persian: بخش كاكي) is in Dashti County, Bushehr province, Iran. Its capital is the city of Kaki.

== History ==
The village of Baduleh was converted to a city in 2012.

== Demographics ==
=== Population ===
At the time of the 2006 census, the district's population was 22,798 in 4,764 households. The following census in 2011 counted 23,157 people in 5,895 households. The 2016 census measured the population of the district as 25,283 inhabitants living in 7,058 households.

=== Administrative divisions ===
Kaki District Population
Administrative Divisions	2006	2011	2016
Cheghapur RD	5,391	5,261	1,581
Kabgan RD	4,850	5,096	4,657
Kaki RD	2,664	2,644	2,898
Baduleh (city)			4,028
Kaki (city)	9,893	10,156	12,119
Total	22,798	23,157	25,283
RD = Rural District
