= Democratic Republic of the Congo earthquake =

There have been several Democratic Republic of the Congo earthquakes. This may refer to:

- 1966 Toro earthquake
- 2002 Kalehe earthquake
- 2005 Lake Tanganyika earthquake
- 2008 Lake Kivu earthquake
- 2015 South Kivu earthquake
