= List of earthquakes in 2015 =

Earthquakes in 2015
Approximate epicenters of notable earthquakes in 2015
- 4.0–5.9 magnitude
- 6.0–6.9 magnitude
- 7.0–7.9 magnitude
- 8.0+ magnitude
- Strongest: 8.3 M_{w}, Chile
- Deadliest: 7.8 M_{w}, Nepal; 8,964 deaths
- Total fatalities: 9,661

Number by magnitude
- 9.0+: 0
- 8.0–8.9: 1
- 7.0–7.9: 18
- 6.0–6.9: 124
- 5.0–5.9: 1,413
- 4.0–4.9: 13,239

This is a list of earthquakes in 2015. Only earthquakes of magnitude 6 or above are included, unless they result in damage and/or casualties, or are notable for some other reason. All dates are listed according to UTC (Coordinated Universal Time) time. This year was dominated by the earthquake in Nepal in April, with around 9,000 deaths. Another deadly event struck Afghanistan, while the strongest quake (8.3) took place in Chile, like in 2014. Malaysia was struck by a 6.0 earthquake which killed 18 climbers including Singaporean students. It is marked as the deadliest in the country.

== Compared to other years ==
Number of earthquakes worldwide for 2005–2015 []
Magnitude	2005	2006	2007	2008	2009	2010	2011	2012	2013	2014	2015
8.0–9.9	1	2	4	1	1	1	1	2	2	1	1
7.0–7.9	10	9	14	12	16	23	19	15	17	11	18
6.0–6.9	139	142	178	167	143	150	187	117	123	143	127
5.0–5.9	1,694	1,726	2,090	1,786	1,912	2,222	2,494	1,565	1,469	1,594	1,425
4.0–4.9	13,893	12,843	12,081	12,294	6,817	10,135	13,130	10,955	11,877	15,817	13,776
Total	15,738	14,723	14,367	14,261	8,891	12,536	15,831	12,660	13,491	17,573	15,351

Map of earthquakes in 2015

== Overall ==
=== By death toll ===
Rank	Death toll	Magnitude	Location	Depth (km)	MMI	Date	Event
1	8,964	7.8	Nepal, Gorkha	8.2	X (Extreme)	April 25	April 2015 Nepal earthquake
2	399	7.5	Afghanistan, Badakhshan	231.0	VII (Very strong)	October 26	October 2015 Hindu Kush earthquake
3	218	7.3	Nepal, Dolakha	15.0	VII (Very strong)	May 12	May 2015 Nepal earthquake
4	18	6.0	Malaysia, Sabah	10.0	VI (Strong)	June 4	2015 Sabah earthquake
5	14	8.3	Chile, Coquimbo offshore	22.4	IX (Violent)	September 16	2015 Illapel earthquake

- Note: At least 10 deaths

=== By magnitude ===
Rank	Magnitude	Death toll	Location	Depth (km)	MMI	Date	Event
1	8.3	14	Chile, Coquimbo offshore	22.4	IX (Violent)	September 16	2015 Illapel earthquake
2	7.8	8,964	Nepal, Gorkha	8.2	X (Extreme)	April 25	April 2015 Nepal earthquake
2	7.8	0	Japan, offshore Bonin Islands	677.6	VI (Strong)	May 30	2015 Ogasawara earthquake
4	7.6	0	Peru, Madre De Dios	600.6	V (Moderate)	November 24	-
4	7.6	0	Peru, Madre De Dios	611.7	IV (Light)	November 24	-
6	7.5	0	Papua New Guinea, New Britain offshore	41.0	VII (Very Strong)	March 29	-
6	7.5	0	Papua New Guinea, New Britain	55.0	VIII (Severe)	May 5	-
6	7.5	399	Afghanistan, Badakshan	231.0	VII (Very Strong)	October 26	October 2015 Hindu Kush earthquake
9	7.3	218	Nepal, Dolakha	15.0	VII (Very Strong)	May 12	May 2015 Nepal earthquake
10	7.2	2	Tajikistan, Gorno-Badakhshan	26.0	VII (Very Strong)	December 7	2015 Tajikistan earthquake
11	7.1	0	Northern Mid-Atlantic Ridge	16.7	I (Not Felt)	February 13	-
11	7.1	0	Papua New Guinea, Bougainville offshore	23.2	VI (Strong)	May 7	-
11	7.1	0	Vanuatu, Espiritu Santo offshore	127.0	VI (Strong)	October 20	-
11	7.1	0	Southeast Indian Ridge	10.0	I (Not Felt)	December 4	-
15	7.0	0	Indonesia, offshore Flores	552.1	VI (Strong)	February 27	-
15	7.0	0	Southern Mid-Atlantic Ridge	10.0	I (Not Felt)	June 17	-
15	7.0	0	Solomon Islands, Santa Cruz Islands offshore	10.0	VI (Strong)	July 18	-
15	7.0	1	Indonesia, Papua	48.0	VII (Very Strong)	July 27	-
15	7.0	0	Chile, Coquimbo	28.4	VII (Very Strong)	September 16	-

- Note: At least 7.0 magnitude

== By month ==
=== January ===
January
- Strongest: 6.8 M_{w}, Vanuatu
- Deadliest: 3.0 M_{w}, Dominican Republic; 2 deaths
- Total fatalities: 2

Number by magnitude
- 8.0–8.9: 0
- 7.0–7.9: 0
- 6.0–6.9: 4
- 5.0–5.9: 117
- 4.0–4.9: 1055

- A magnitude 6.5 earthquake struck offshore of Panama 236 km (147 mi) south of Punta de Burica on January 7 at a depth of 8.0 km (5.0 mi).
- A magnitude 3.3 earthquake struck Connecticut, United States 0 km (0 mi) northeast of Wauregan on January 12 at a depth of 5.4 km (3.4 mi). Additional damage occurred to buildings already affected by the 2.3 magnitude quake a few days prior.
- A magnitude 4.7 earthquake struck Dominican Republic 5 km (3.1 mi) west southwest of Las Salinas on January 13 at a depth of 10.0 km (6.2 mi). Several schools were severely damaged in Barahona.
- A magnitude 3.0 earthquake struck Dominican Republic near the town of Puerto Alejandro on January 14 at an unknown depth. This was an aftershock of the 4.7 quake the day before. No damage was reported, but two people were killed in an accident caused by the quake at a salt mine near Puerto Alejandro.
- A magnitude 5.3 earthquake struck China 59 km (37 mi) west southwest of Leshan in Sichuan on January 14 at a depth of 10.0 km (6.2 mi). The earthquake injured at least 11 people.
- A magnitude 6.8 earthquake struck Vanuatu 81 km (50 mi) north northeast of Port Vila on January 23 at a depth of 220.0 km (136.7 mi).
- A magnitude 4.2 earthquake struck Turkey 15 km (9.3 mi) east of Mustafakemalpaşa on January 23 at a depth of 5.0 km (3.1 mi). At least three houses were damaged in Bursa.
- A magnitude 6.2 earthquake struck offshore of Fiji 54 km (34 mi) southeast of Ndoi Island on January 28 at a depth of 484.1 km (300.8 mi).
- A magnitude 6.0 earthquake struck offshore of Vanuatu 209 km (130 mi) south southeast of Isangel on January 30 at a depth of 7.1 km (4.4 mi).

=== February ===
February
- Strongest: 7.1 M_{w}, Mid-Atlantic Ridge
- Deadliest: 3.7 M_{w} Bosnia and Herzegovina; 4 deaths
- Total fatalities: 4

Number by magnitude
- 8.0–8.9: 0
- 7.0–7.9: 2
- 6.0–6.9: 10
- 5.0–5.9: 110
- 4.0–4.9: 970

- A magnitude 6.3 earthquake struck Argentina 63 km (39 mi) west of Villa General Roca on February 2 at a depth of 172.0 km (106.9 mi).
- A magnitude 3.8 earthquake struck Cuzco, Peru on February 4. Around 200 homes were severely damaged, displacing 1,500 people.
- A magnitude 5.0 earthquake struck Sichuan, China on February 6 at a depth of 10.0 km (6.2 mi). At least 1,055 houses were damaged or destroyed, affecting 3,700 people. Power outages also occurred.
- A magnitude 6.7 earthquake struck Argentina 103 km (64 mi) west of El Aguilar on February 11 at a depth of 223.0 km (138.6 mi).
- A magnitude 7.1 earthquake struck the Northern Mid-Atlantic Ridge on February 13 at a depth of 16.7 km (10.4 mi).
- A magnitude 6.2 earthquake struck Taiwan 31 km (19 mi) east southeast of Taitung City on February 13 at a depth of 30.0 km (18.6 mi).
- A magnitude 4.8 earthquake struck Ilam Province, Iran on February 15 at a depth of 10.0 km (6.2 mi). Three people were injured and several homes were damaged.
- A magnitude 6.2 earthquake struck offshore of South Georgia and the South Sandwich Islands 146 km (91 mi) north northwest of Visokoi Island on February 16 at a depth of 13.0 km (8.1 mi).
- A magnitude 6.7 earthquake struck offshore of Japan 83 km (52 mi) east northeast of Miyako on February 16 at a depth of 23.0 km (14.3 mi).
- A magnitude 6.1 earthquake struck offshore of the Solomon Islands 183 km (114 mi) west of Lata on February 18 at a depth of 10.0 km (6.2 mi).
- A magnitude 6.4 earthquake struck Vanuatu 86 km (53 mi) east southeast of Lakatoro on February 19 at a depth of 10.0 km (6.2 mi). Some damage was caused in Paama, where a small tsunami was observed.
- A magnitude 6.2 earthquake struck offshore of Japan 142 km (88 mi) east of Miyako on February 20 at a depth of 10.0 km (6.2 mi). This was an aftershock of the 6.7 magnitude quake.
- A magnitude 4.5 earthquake struck Yunnan, China on February 20 at a depth of 10.0 km (6.2 mi). 276 houses were destroyed and 3,374 others were damaged, and around 5 km (3.1 mi) of a road were damaged by landslides.
- A magnitude 6.0 earthquake struck offshore of Japan 133 km (83 mi) east of Miyako on February 21 at a depth of 7.0 km (4.3 mi). This was an aftershock of the 6.7 magnitude quake.
- A magnitude 3.7 earthquake struck near Tuzla, Bosnia and Herzegovina on February 21 at a depth of 2.0 km (1.2 mi). Four miners were killed and another was injured when a landslide occurred in Tuzla.
- A magnitude 6.2 earthquake struck offshore of Mexico 207 km (129 mi) west southwest of José María Morelos on February 22 at a depth of 5.0 km (3.1 mi).
- A magnitude 5.4 earthquake struck Pakistan 23 km (14 mi) east of Battagram on February 26 at a depth of 29.7 km (18.5 mi). The earthquake injured at least 15 people and caused some damage.
- A magnitude 7.0 earthquake struck Indonesia 150 km (93 mi) north northeast of Maumere, East Nusa Tenggara on February 27 at a depth of 552.1 km (343.1 mi). Hundreds of homes were damaged in Flores, some severely.

=== March ===
March
- Strongest: 7.5 M_{w}, Papua New Guinea
- Deadliest: 4.6 M_{w} China; 2 deaths
- Total fatalities: 2

Number by magnitude
- 8.0–8.9: 0
- 7.0–7.9: 1
- 6.0–6.9: 11
- 5.0–5.9: 100
- 4.0–4.9: 1010

- A magnitude 6.1 earthquake struck Indonesia 157 km (98 mi) west of Pariaman, West Sumatra on March 3 at a depth of 28.0 km (17.4 mi).
- A magnitude 6.0 earthquake struck the Mid-Indian Ridge on March 6 at a depth of 10.0 km (6.2 mi).
- A magnitude 6.2 earthquake struck Colombia 2 km (1.2 mi) north northwest of Cepitá on March 10 at a depth of 155.0 km (96.3 mi). Nine people were injured, 286 houses were destroyed and 226 others were damaged in parts of the country, including the capital Bogotá.
- A magnitude 4.6 earthquake struck Anhui, China on March 14 at a depth of 10.0 km (6.2 mi). Two people were killed by a collapsing wall and thirteen others were injured. 155 houses collapsed and 11,079 others were damaged.
- A magnitude 6.1 earthquake struck Indonesia 70 km (43 mi) northwest of Luwuk, Central Sulawesi on March 15 at a depth of 31.0 km (19.3 mi).
- A magnitude 6.2 earthquake struck Indonesia 136 km (85 mi) northwest of Kota Ternate, North Maluku on March 17 at a depth of 44.0 km (27.3 mi).
- A magnitude 6.2 earthquake struck offshore of Chile 75 km (47 mi) north northwest of Talcahuano on March 18 at a depth of 13.0 km (8.1 mi).
- A magnitude 6.4 earthquake struck Chile 94 km (58 mi) southwest of Curahuara de Carangas, Bolivia on March 23 at a depth of 130.0 km (80.8 mi).
- A magnitude 7.5 earthquake struck Papua New Guinea 53 km (33 mi) southeast of Kokopo on March 29 at a depth of 41.0 km (25.5 mi). A "small" tsunami was reported in Rabaul harbor and a 3 cm (1.2 in) tsunami in the Solomon Islands.
- A magnitude 5.4 earthquake struck Guizhou, China on March 30 at a depth of 17.1 km (10.6 mi). Over 5,000 houses were destroyed and 20,000 others were damaged in the earthquake, and four people were injured.
- A magnitude 6.0 earthquake struck offshore of Tonga 98 km (61 mi) northeast of Hihifo on March 30 at a depth of 10.0 km (6.2 mi). This was a foreshock of the 6.5 magnitude quake.
- A magnitude 6.4 earthquake struck offshore of Tonga 110 km (68 mi) northeast of Hihifo on March 30 at a depth of 14.5 km (9.0 mi). This was a foreshock of the 6.5 magnitude quake.
- A magnitude 6.5 earthquake struck offshore of Tonga 96 km (60 mi) east northeast of Hihifo on March 30 at a depth of 11.0 km (6.8 mi).
- A magnitude 6.0 earthquake struck Papua New Guinea 65 km (40 mi) south southeast of Kokopo on March 31 at a depth of 39.0 km (24.2 mi). This was an aftershock of the 7.5 magnitude quake.

=== April ===
April
- Strongest: 7.8 M_{w}, Nepal
- Deadliest: 7.8 M_{w}, Nepal; 8,964 deaths
- Total fatalities: 8,966

Number by magnitude
- 8.0–8.9: 0
- 7.0–7.9: 1
- 6.0–6.9: 14
- 5.0–5.9: 96
- 4.0–4.9: 1047

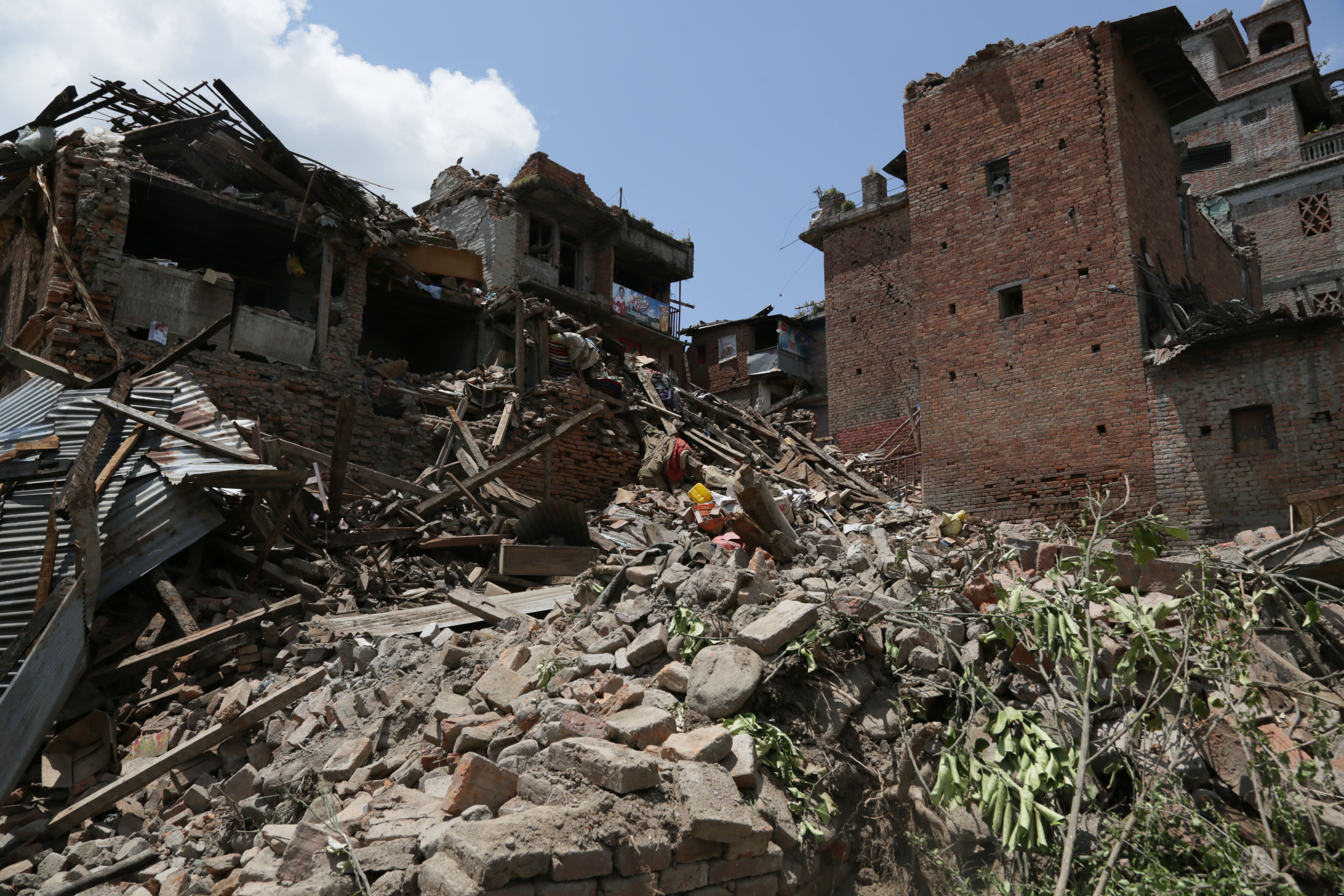
Damaged homes in Kathmandu after the earthquake in Nepal.

- A magnitude 4.9 earthquake struck Uttarakhand, India on April 1 at a depth of 10.0 km (6.2 mi). Eight people, including five children were injured by falling debris and two homes collapsed, with 500 others damaged.
- A magnitude 6.3 earthquake struck offshore of Tonga 106 km (66 mi) northeast of Hihifo on April 7 at a depth of 30.0 km (18.6 mi). This was an aftershock of the 6.5 magnitude quake in March.
- A magnitude 5.4 earthquake struck Gansu, China at a depth of 10.0 km (6.2 mi). One person was killed by a landslide and fifteen others were injured. 538 houses were destroyed and 95,872 others were damaged.
- A magnitude 6.0 earthquake struck offshore of Greece 26 km (16 mi) south southwest of Fry on April 16 at a depth of 20.0 km (12.4 mi).
- A magnitude 6.5 earthquake struck offshore of Fiji 181 km (112 mi) south southwest of Alo, Wallis and Futuna on April 17 at a depth of 10.0 km (6.2 mi).
- A magnitude 6.4 earthquake struck offshore of Taiwan 75 km (47 mi) west southwest of Yonakuni, Japan on April 20 at a depth of 29.0 km (18.0 mi). One person was killed in a house fire caused by the earthquake in the Hsinchuang District of New Taipei.
- A magnitude 6.1 earthquake struck offshore of Japan 72 km (45 mi) southwest of Yonakuni in the Yaeyama Islands on April 20 at a depth of 29.0 km (18.0 mi). This was an aftershock of the 6.4 magnitude quake.
- A magnitude 6.0 earthquake struck offshore of Japan 69 km (43 mi) southwest of Yonakuni in the Yaeyama Islands on April 20 at a depth of 29.0 km (18.0 mi). This was an aftershock of the 6.4 magnitude quake.
- A magnitude 6.2 earthquake struck offshore of the Solomon Islands 161 km (100 mi) south southeast of Lata on April 22 at a depth of 72.0 km (44.7 mi).
- A magnitude 6.1 earthquake struck New Zealand 73 km (45 mi) south of Wakefield on April 24 at a depth of 48.0 km (29.8 mi).
- A magnitude 6.2 earthquake struck offshore of British Columbia, Canada 282 km (175 mi) west northwest of Port McNeill on April 24 at a depth of 8.0 km (5.0 mi).
- A magnitude 7.8 earthquake struck Nepal 67 km (42 mi) north northeast of Bharatpur on April 25 at a depth of 8.2 km (5.1 mi). 8,857 people were killed in Nepal, 78 in India, 25 in the Tibet Autonomous Region of China, and 4 in Bangladesh.
- A magnitude 6.1 earthquake struck Nepal 0 km (0 mi) north northwest of Dhulikhel on April 25 at a depth of 10.0 km (6.2 mi). This was an aftershock of the 7.8 magnitude quake.
- A magnitude 6.6 earthquake struck Nepal 71 km (44 mi) north northeast of Bharatpur on April 25 at a depth of 10.0 km (6.2 mi). This was an aftershock of the 7.8 magnitude quake.
- A magnitude 6.7 earthquake struck Nepal 21 km (13 mi) south southeast of Kodari on April 26 at a depth of 22.9 km (14.2 mi). This was an aftershock of the 7.8 magnitude quake.
- A magnitude 5.1 earthquake struck Nepal 13 km (8.1 mi) east southeast of Ilam on April 27 at a depth of 31.7 km (19.7 mi). Dozens of buildings were damaged in the state of West Bengal in neighboring India, including a school. This earthquake was not an aftershock of the April 2015 Nepal earthquake a few days prior.
- A magnitude 5.4 earthquake struck Ecuador 6 km (3.7 mi) north northwest of Milagro on April 28 at a depth of 89.0 km (55.3 mi). Two people were injured as well as some damage was caused.
- A magnitude 6.1 earthquake struck Fiji 27 km (17 mi) south southeast of Ndoi Island on April 28 at a depth of 581.0 km (361.0 mi).
- A magnitude 4.9 earthquake struck Iran 56 km (35 mi) east southeast of Mohr on April 29 at a depth of 10.0 km (6.2 mi). Five people were injured as well as some damage like cracked or collapsed walls and broken windows were observed.
- A magnitude 6.7 earthquake struck Papua New Guinea 126 km (78 mi) south southwest of Kokopo on April 30 at a depth of 31.0 km (19.3 mi). Several houses were destroyed, and power outages occurred in Rabaul. This was a foreshock of the 7.5 magnitude quake in May.

=== May ===
May
- Strongest: 7.8 M_{w}, Japan
- Deadliest: 7.3 M_{w}, Nepal; 218 deaths
- Total fatalities: 224

Number by magnitude
- 8.0–8.9: 0
- 7.0–7.9: 4
- 6.0–6.9: 17
- 5.0–5.9: 155
- 4.0–4.9: 1376

- A magnitude 6.8 earthquake struck Papua New Guinea 109 km (68 mi) south southwest of Kokopo on May 1 at a depth of 44.0 km (27.3 mi). This was a foreshock of the 7.5 magnitude quake.
- A magnitude 6.0 earthquake struck Papua New Guinea 134 km (83 mi) south southwest of Kokopo on May 1 at a depth of 35.0 km (21.7 mi). This was a foreshock of the 7.5 magnitude quake.
- A magnitude 4.9 earthquake struck Nepal 67 km (42 mi) east southeast of Pokhara on May 2 at a depth of 10.0 km (6.2 mi). Four people were killed in a landslide in Barpak, while one person was slightly injured when a house collapsed. It is an aftershock of the 7.8 quake on April 25.
- A magnitude 6.0 earthquake struck Papua New Guinea 156 km (97 mi) south southwest of Kokopo on May 3 at a depth of 24.0 km (14.9 mi). This was a foreshock of the 7.5 magnitude quake.
- A magnitude 7.5 earthquake struck Papua New Guinea 131 km (81 mi) south southwest of Kokopo on May 5 at a depth of 55.0 km (34.2 mi). Further damage in Rabaul; widespread power outages, cracked walls, and partially collapsed homes. A tsunami estimated at under 1 m (3 ft 3 in) was reported in New Britain.
- A magnitude 5.0 earthquake struck Iran 10 km (6.2 mi) north northwest of Kashmar on May 5 at a depth of 8.6 km (5.3 mi). 64 people were injured and 200 buildings were damaged.
- A magnitude 7.1 earthquake struck offshore of Papua New Guinea 143 km (89 mi) southwest of Panguna on May 7 at a depth of 10.0 km (6.2 mi). This was a major aftershock of the 7.5 magnitude quake.
- A magnitude 6.0 earthquake struck offshore of Japan 292 km (181 mi) southeast of Hachijo-jima in the Izu Islands on May 10 at a depth of 6.0 km (3.7 mi).
- A magnitude 7.3 earthquake struck Nepal 20 km (12 mi) south southeast of Kodari on May 12 at a depth of 15.0 km (9.3 mi). Nepalese authorities reported 153 dead, while 62 were killed in India, two in Bangladesh, and one in the Tibet Autonomous Region of China. This was a major aftershock of the 7.8 magnitude quake in April.
- A magnitude 6.3 earthquake struck Nepal 42 km (26 mi) south southeast of Kodari on May 12 at a depth of 15.0 km (9.3 mi). This was an aftershock of the 7.3 magnitude quake.
- A magnitude 6.8 earthquake struck Japan 32 km (20 mi) southeast of Ōfunato on May 12 at a depth of 35.0 km (21.7 mi). Windows shattered, several homes partially collapsed, and cracks appeared in the walls of a school.
- A magnitude 6.0 earthquake struck Indonesia 106 km (66 mi) east southeast of Sungai Penuh, Jambi province on May 15 at a depth of 151.0 km (93.8 mi). Cracks appeared in the walls of several hundred homes.
- A magnitude 5.5 earthquake struck Nepal on May 16 at a depth of 7 km (4.3 mi). One person was killed by a collapsing wall in Bihar, India, while another died of a heart attack. This was an aftershock of the 7.3 magnitude quake.
- A magnitude 6.7 earthquake struck the Pacific-Antarctic Ridge on May 19 at a depth of 7.2 km (4.5 mi).
- A magnitude 6.0 earthquake struck offshore of Tonga 135 km (84 mi) west northwest of Pangai on May 19 at a depth of 203.0 km (126.1 mi). This was a foreshock of the 6.2 magnitude quake.
- A magnitude 6.8 earthquake struck offshore of the Solomon Islands 178 km (111 mi) west of Lata on May 20 at a depth of 11.0 km (6.8 mi). This was a foreshock of the 6.9 magnitude quake.
- A magnitude 4.4 earthquake struck Iran 31 km (19 mi) south southwest of Khorramabad on May 21 at a depth of 10.0 km (6.2 mi). About 50 buildings were severely damaged in Khorramabad.
- A magnitude 6.9 earthquake struck offshore of the Solomon Islands 205 km (127 mi) east southeast of Kirakira on May 22 at a depth of 11.2 km (7.0 mi).
- A magnitude 6.8 earthquake struck offshore of the Solomon Islands 159 km (99 mi) east southeast of Kirakira on May 22 at a depth of 10.0 km (6.2 mi). This was an aftershock of the 6.9 magnitude quake.
- A magnitude 6.3 earthquake struck the Southern Mid-Atlantic Ridge on May 24 at a depth of 10.0 km (6.2 mi).
- A magnitude 6.2 earthquake struck offshore of Tonga 175 km (109 mi) west northwest of Pangai on May 24 at a depth of 10.0 km (6.2 mi).
- A magnitude 5.2 earthquake struck Japan 2 km (1.2 mi) north of Ageoshimo on May 25 at a depth of 38.7 km (24.0 mi). Two people were injured.
- A magnitude 6.8 earthquake struck offshore of Alaska, United States 117 km (73 mi) south southeast of Ugashik on May 29 at a depth of 72.6 km (45.1 mi).
- A magnitude 7.8 earthquake struck offshore of Japan 189 km (117 mi) west northwest of Chichi-jima in the Ogasawara Islands on May 30 at a depth of 664.0 km (412.6 mi). The Associated Press agency reported "twelve people suffered minor injuries", and TEPCO claimed that 400 customers lost electricity in Saitama Prefecture.
- A magnitude 6.0 earthquake struck offshore of Tonga 51 km (32 mi) east northeast of Hihifo on May 30 at a depth of 10.0 km (6.2 mi). This was an aftershock of the 6.2 magnitude quake.
- A magnitude 6.2 earthquake struck offshore of Japan 398 km (247 mi) southeast of Hachijo-jima in the Izu Islands on May 30 at a depth of 6.0 km (3.7 mi).

=== June ===
June
- Strongest: 7.0 M_{w}, Mid-Atlantic Ridge
- Deadliest: 6.0 M_{w}, Malaysia; 18 deaths
- Total fatalities: 18

Number by magnitude
- 8.0–8.9: 0
- 7.0–7.9: 1
- 6.0–6.9: 9
- 5.0–5.9: 93
- 4.0–4.9: 1013

- A magnitude 6.0 earthquake struck Malaysia 14 km (8.7 mi) west northwest of Ranau on June 4 at a depth of 10.0 km (6.2 mi). Eighteen people died and several were injured in rockfalls while ascending Mount Kinabalu.
- A magnitude 6.1 earthquake struck offshore of Japan 74 km (46 mi) east northeast of Mutsu on June 8 at a depth of 42.0 km (26.1 mi).
- A magnitude 6.0 earthquake struck Chile 50 km (31 mi) east of Calama on June 10 at a depth of 124.0 km (77.1 mi).
- A magnitude 6.0 earthquake struck offshore of Tonga 89 km (55 mi) east northeast of Hihifo on June 12 at a depth of 48.0 km (29.8 mi). This was an aftershock of the 6.2 magnitude quake in May.
- A magnitude 7.0 earthquake struck the Southern Mid-Atlantic Ridge on June 17 at a depth of 10.0 km (6.2 mi).
- A magnitude 6.4 earthquake struck offshore of Chile 74 km (46 mi) west northwest of Talcahuano on June 20 at a depth of 11.0 km (6.8 mi). Cracks in walls and falling objects were reported near the epicentre.
- A magnitude 6.0 earthquake struck Fiji 45 km (28 mi) east northeast of Ndoi Island on June 21 at a depth of 562.6 km (349.6 mi).
- A magnitude 6.5 earthquake struck offshore of Japan 256 km (159 mi) west northwest of Chichi-jima in the Ogasawara Islands on June 23 at a depth of 460.0 km (285.8 mi).
- A magnitude 6.0 earthquake struck offshore of New Zealand 89 km (55 mi) southeast of L'Esperance Rock in the Kermadec Islands on June 25 at a depth of 10.0 km (6.2 mi).
- A magnitude 6.0 earthquake struck Papua New Guinea 146 km (91 mi) south southwest of Kokopo on June 30 at a depth of 43.0 km (26.7 mi).

=== July ===
July
- Strongest: 7.0 M_{w}, Solomon Islands; 7.0 M_{w}, Indonesia
- Deadliest: 6.4 M_{w}, China; 3 deaths 5.1 M_{w}, Pakistan; 3 deaths
- Total fatalities: 8

Number by magnitude
- 8.0–8.9: 0
- 7.0–7.9: 2
- 6.0–6.9: 8
- 5.0–5.9: 126
- 4.0–4.9: 1150

- A magnitude 6.0 earthquake struck the Solomon Islands 91 km (57 mi) southeast of Kirakira on July 1 at a depth of 12.0 km (7.5 mi).
- A magnitude 6.4 earthquake struck China 57 km (35 mi) west northwest of Zangguy, Hotan Prefecture, Xinjiang on July 3 at a depth of 20.0 km (12.4 mi). Three people were killed, 71 were injured and about 3,000 homes destroyed or damaged.
- A magnitude 6.1 earthquake struck the Philippines 23 km (14 mi) northwest of Santa Monica on the island of Siargao on July 3 at a depth of 32.0 km (19.9 mi). One person died of a heart attack in Balingasag and minor damage was observed in Del Carmen, Surigao del Norte.
- A magnitude 6.3 earthquake struck offshore of Russia's Kuril Islands 101 km (63 mi) east of Shikotan island on July 7 at a depth of 49.0 km (30.4 mi).
- A magnitude 6.7 earthquake struck the Solomon Islands 150 km (93 mi) west northwest of Malango on Guadalcanal on July 10 at a depth of 12.0 km (7.5 mi).
- A magnitude 6.5 earthquake struck offshore of Barbados 128 km (80 mi) northeast of Bathsheba on July 16 at a depth of 20.0 km (12.4 mi).
- A magnitude 7.0 earthquake struck offshore of the Solomon Islands 80 km (50 mi) west northwest of Lata on July 18 at a depth of 11.0 km (6.8 mi).
- A magnitude 5.1 earthquake struck Pakistan 19 km (12 mi) west southwest of Murree on July 24 at a depth of 17.0 km (10.6 mi). The earthquake killed 3 people.
- A magnitude 6.9 earthquake struck offshore of Alaska, United States 74 km (46 mi) south southwest of Nikolski in the Aleutian Islands on July 27 at a depth of 29.0 km (18.0 mi).
- A magnitude 7.0 earthquake struck Indonesia 234 km (145 mi) west of Abepura, Papua on July 27 at a depth of 48.0 km (29.8 mi). One teenager was killed and some buildings were damaged.
- A magnitude 6.3 earthquake struck Alaska, United States 52 km (32 mi) east northeast of Pedro Bay on July 29 at a depth of 119.3 km (74.1 mi).

=== August ===
August
- Strongest: 6.6 M_{w}, Solomon Islands
- Deadliest: 5.8 M_{w}, Democratic Republic of the Congo; 3 deaths
- Total fatalities: 3

Number by magnitude
- 8.0–8.9: 0
- 7.0–7.9: 0
- 6.0–6.9: 6
- 5.0–5.9: 110
- 4.0–4.9: 1059

- A magnitude 6.0 earthquake struck offshore of Tonga 294 km (183 mi) southwest of the Minerva Reefs on August 6 at a depth of 269.0 km (167.1 mi).
- A magnitude 5.8 earthquake struck the Democratic Republic of the Congo 37 km (23 mi) north of Cyangugu, Rwanda on August 7 at a depth of 11.0 km (6.8 mi). One policeman died in a building collapse in Kabare, and two children died in a house fire caused by the quake.
- A magnitude 6.6 earthquake struck offshore of the Solomon Islands 186 km (116 mi) west northwest of Malango on Guadalcanal on August 10 at a depth of 22.0 km (13.7 mi).
- A magnitude 6.5 earthquake struck offshore of the Solomon Islands 177 km (110 mi) southeast of Gizo on August 12 at a depth of 6.4 km (4.0 mi). This was an aftershock of the 6.6 magnitude quake.
- (French Southern and Antarctic Lands) A magnitude 6.0 earthquake struck offshore of France's Southern and Antarctic Lands 102 km (63 mi) north northeast of Amsterdam Island on August 13 at a depth of 10.0 km (6.2 mi).
- A magnitude 6.4 earthquake struck offshore of the Solomon Islands 213 km (132 mi) east southeast of Kirakira on August 15 at a depth of 8.0 km (5.0 mi).
- A magnitude 6.0 earthquake struck New Zealand 88 km (55 mi) north of L'Esperance Rock in the Kermadec Islands on August 24 at a depth of 228.0 km (141.7 mi).

=== September ===
September
- Strongest: 8.3 M_{w}, Chile
- Deadliest: 8.3 M_{w}, Chile; 14 deaths
- Total fatalities: 15

Number by magnitude
- 8.0–8.9: 1
- 7.0–7.9: 1
- 6.0–6.9: 22
- 5.0–5.9: 180
- 4.0–4.9: 1608

- A magnitude 6.0 earthquake struck offshore of Japan 270 km (170 mi) southeast of Hachijo-jima in the Izu Islands on September 1 at a depth of 8.0 km (5.0 mi).
- A magnitude 4.0 earthquake struck Rajasthan, India on September 3 at a depth of 14.2 km (8.8 mi). A pregnant woman was killed by a collapsing wall.
- A magnitude 6.0 earthquake struck offshore of Tonga 170 km (110 mi) southwest of Minerva Reefs on September 7 at a depth of 535.0 km (332.4 mi).
- A magnitude 6.3 earthquake struck offshore of New Zealand 182 km (113 mi) south southeast of L'Esperance Rock in the Kermadec Islands on September 7 at a depth of 17.0 km (10.6 mi).
- A magnitude 6.0 earthquake struck offshore of the United States 104 km (65 mi) south southwest of Nikolski, Alaska on September 10 at a depth of 20.0 km (12.4 mi).
- A magnitude 6.7 earthquake struck offshore of Mexico 95 km (59 mi) southwest of Topolobampo on September 13 at a depth of 10.0 km (6.2 mi).
- A magnitude 6.3 earthquake struck Indonesia 161 km (100 mi) northwest of Ternate, North Maluku on September 16 at a depth of 41.6 km (25.8 mi).
- A magnitude 6.1 earthquake struck Papua New Guinea 156 km (97 mi) east southeast of Kimbe on September 16 at a depth of 6.0 km (3.7 mi).
- A magnitude 8.3-8.4 earthquake struck Chile 48 km (30 mi) west of Illapel on September 16 at a depth of 22.4 km (13.9 mi). Thirteen people were killed, six are missing and one million were evacuated in Chile. One man died, some damage and rockslides were observed in Argentina. A tsunami occurred reaching as high as 4.75 m (15.6 ft) in Coquimbo, 1 m (3 ft 3 in) in Hawaii, and an 80 cm (31 in) wave was recorded at the port of Kuji, Iwate Prefecture, Japan.
- A magnitude 6.4 earthquake struck Chile 54 km (34 mi) west of Illapel on September 16 at a depth of 26.7 km (16.6 mi). This was an aftershock of the 8.3 magnitude quake.
- A magnitude 6.1 earthquake struck Chile 55 km (34 mi) west southwest of Illapel on September 16 at a depth of 19.1 km (11.9 mi). This was an aftershock of the 8.3 magnitude quake.
- A magnitude 6.1 earthquake struck offshore of Chile 71 km (44 mi) west of Illapel on September 16 at a depth of 35.0 km (21.7 mi). This was an aftershock of the 8.3 magnitude quake.
- A magnitude 7.0 earthquake struck Chile 25 km (16 mi) west northwest of Illapel on September 16 at a depth of 28.4 km (17.6 mi). This was a major aftershock of the 8.3 magnitude quake.
- A magnitude 6.4 earthquake struck Chile 70 km (43 mi) southwest of Ovalle on September 17 at a depth of 42.3 km (26.3 mi). This was an aftershock of the 8.3 magnitude quake.
- A magnitude 6.5 earthquake struck Chile 54 km (34 mi) west northwest of Illapel on September 17 at a depth of 27.0 km (16.8 mi). This was an aftershock of the 8.3 magnitude quake.
- A magnitude 6.7 earthquake struck Chile 61 km (38 mi) west northwest of Illapel on September 17 at a depth of 23.0 km (14.3 mi). This was an aftershock of the 8.3 magnitude quake.
- A magnitude 6.2 earthquake struck offshore of Chile 92 km (57 mi) northwest of Valparaíso on September 18 at a depth of 8.0 km (5.0 mi). This was an aftershock of the 8.3 magnitude quake.
- A magnitude 6.0 earthquake struck the Northern Mid-Atlantic Ridge on September 18 at a depth of 10.0 km (6.2 mi).
- A magnitude 6.1 earthquake struck offshore of Chile 79 km (49 mi) west northwest of Coquimbo on September 19 at a depth of 6.0 km (3.7 mi). This was an aftershock of the 8.3 magnitude quake.
- A magnitude 6.2 earthquake struck offshore of Chile 79 km (49 mi) west of La Ligua on September 19 at a depth of 18.0 km (11.2 mi). This was an aftershock of the 8.3 magnitude quake.
- A magnitude 6.1 earthquake struck Chile 54 km (34 mi) west of Illapel on September 21 at a depth of 30.0 km (18.6 mi). This was an aftershock of the 8.3 magnitude quake.
- A magnitude 6.6 earthquake struck Chile 22 km (14 mi) west southwest of Illapel on September 21 at a depth of 35.0 km (21.7 mi). This was an aftershock of the 8.3 magnitude quake.
- A magnitude 6.0 earthquake struck Chile 22 km (14 mi) north northwest of Illapel on September 22 at a depth of 58.0 km (36.0 mi). This was an aftershock of the 8.3 magnitude quake.
- A magnitude 6.6 earthquake struck Indonesia 28 km (17 mi) north of Sorong, West Papua on September 24 at a depth of 18.0 km (11.2 mi). About 60 people were injured while 200 buildings were damaged.
- A magnitude 6.3 earthquake struck Chile 26 km (16 mi) south southwest of Ovalle on September 26 at a depth of 46.0 km (28.6 mi). This was an aftershock of the 8.3 magnitude quake.

=== October ===
October
- Strongest: 7.5 M_{w}, Afghanistan
- Deadliest: 7.5 M_{w}, Afghanistan; 399 deaths
- Total fatalities: 402

Number by magnitude
- 8.0–8.9: 0
- 7.0–7.9: 2
- 6.0–6.9: 5
- 5.0–5.9: 85
- 4.0–4.9: 1136

- A magnitude 6.1 earthquake struck the Pacific-Antarctic Ridge on October 11 at a depth of 10.0 km (6.2 mi).
- A magnitude 6.0 earthquake struck offshore of Russia's Kuril Islands 202 km (126 mi) south of Severo-Kuril'sk on October 14 at a depth of 12.0 km (7.5 mi).
- A magnitude 5.8 earthquake struck Argentina 19 km (12 mi) east southeast of El Galpón on October 17 at a depth of 17.0 km (10.6 mi). A woman was killed and many buildings were damaged in El Galpón, including a school.
- A magnitude 6.0 earthquake struck Tonga 63 km (39 mi) east southeast of Hihifo on October 18 at a depth of 12.0 km (7.5 mi).
- A magnitude 4.2 earthquake struck Russia 11 km (6.8 mi) southeast of Shalya on October 18 at a depth of 15.4 km (9.6 mi). Slight damage occurred in Yekaterinburg, where the window panes of a school was broken. A dam was also cracked in Pervouralsk. It is one of the strongest earthquakes in the area in years, and the first one to be felt there since 2010.
- A magnitude 7.1 earthquake struck Vanuatu 31 km (19 mi) northeast of Port Olry on October 20 at a depth of 135.0 km (83.9 mi).
- A magnitude 4.4 earthquake struck offshore of Indonesia 4 km (2.5 mi) north of Batang on October 22 at a depth of 53.8 km (33.4 mi). Minor to buildings in several villages in the epicentral area, including a mosque. Two landslides also occurred.
- A magnitude 5.6 earthquake struck Punjab, Pakistan on October 23 at a depth of 11.0 km (6.8 mi). Two people were killed, one by a collapsing house, another due to a heart-attack. Another person was injured, with dozens of adobe houses destroyed.
- A magnitude 6.2 earthquake struck the Southern Ocean 183 km (114 mi) east of Norway's Bouvet Island on October 23 at a depth of 11.0 km (6.8 mi).
- A magnitude 6.0 earthquake struck offshore of South Africa's Prince Edward Islands group 129 km (80 mi) north northwest of Marion Island on October 23 at a depth of 10.0 km (6.2 mi).
- A magnitude 7.5 earthquake struck Afghanistan 46 km (29 mi) east of Farkhar, Farkhar district, Takhar province on October 26 at a depth of 231.0 km (143.5 mi). Destruction occurred mainly in Afghanistan and Pakistan on houses. At least 280 people were killed in Pakistan, 115 in Afghanistan and 4 in India, with more than 2,300 injured. The tremor was also strongly felt in India and Tajikistan, lighter in Kyrgyzstan and Kazakhstan. At least 14 people in Tajikistan suffered injuries.

=== November ===
November
- Strongest: 7.6 M_{w}, Peru; Two events
- Deadliest: Three events each resulted in 2 deaths
- Total fatalities: 9

Number by magnitude
- 8.0–8.9: 0
- 7.0–7.9: 2
- 6.0–6.9: 14
- 5.0–5.9: 136
- 4.0–4.9: 1204

- A magnitude 6.5 earthquake struck Indonesia 47 km (29 mi) northwest of Maubara, East Timor on November 4 at a depth of 20.0 km (12.4 mi). Minor damage was reported.
- A magnitude 5.3 earthquake struck Venezuela 19 km (12 mi) west southwest of El Ejido in the state of Mérida on November 7 at a depth of 15.1 km (9.4 mi). The earthquake damaged some buildings and triggered rockfalls, killing one man and injuring 4 others.
- A magnitude 6.2 earthquake struck offshore of Chile 107 km (66 mi) west northwest of Coquimbo on November 7 at a depth of 13.0 km (8.1 mi). This was an Aftershock of the 8.3 magnitude quake in September.
- A magnitude 6.8 earthquake struck Chile 39 km (24 mi) southwest of Ovalle on November 7 at a depth of 46.0 km (28.6 mi).
- A magnitude 6.6 earthquake struck offshore of India's Nicobar Islands 129 km (80 mi) northwest of Sabang in the special region of Aceh, Indonesia on November 8 at a depth of 10.0 km (6.2 mi).
- A magnitude 6.5 earthquake struck offshore of the United States 99 km (62 mi) southeast of Atka, Alaska on November 9 at a depth of 15.0 km (9.3 mi).
- A magnitude 6.9 earthquake struck offshore of Chile 81 km (50 mi) northwest of Coquimbo on November 11 at a depth of 12.0 km (7.5 mi). This was an Aftershock of the 8.3 Quake in September. The Pacific Tsunami Warning Center reported a 15 cm (5.9 in) tsunami at Coquimbo and a 10 cm (3.9 in) tsunami at Huasco in Atacama Region.
- A magnitude 6.9 earthquake struck offshore of Chile 85 km (53 mi) northwest of Coquimbo on November 11 at a depth of 10.0 km (6.2 mi). This was an aftershock of the 8.3 magnitude quake in September.
- A magnitude 6.7 earthquake struck offshore of Japan 140 km (87 mi) west southwest of Makurazaki, Kagoshima Prefecture on November 13 at a depth of 12.0 km (7.5 mi). The Japan Meteorological Agency reported a 30 cm (12 in) tsunami at Nakanoshima island in Kagoshima Prefecture.
- A magnitude 6.5 earthquake struck Greece 19 km (12 mi) south southwest of Lefkada on November 17 at a depth of 11.0 km (6.8 mi). Two women were killed in house collapses in Ponti and Athani on Lefkada; the quake also damaged the main road in the southwestern part of Lefkada and several buildings and a landslide in Egremni Beach occurred.
- A magnitude 6.8 earthquake struck the Solomon Islands 153 km (95 mi) west southwest of Buala on Santa Isabel Island on November 18 at a depth of 12.6 km (7.8 mi).
- A magnitude 6.1 earthquake struck Indonesia 176 km (109 mi) west northwest of Saumlaki in southern Maluku province on November 21 at a depth of 82.0 km (51.0 mi).
- A magnitude 3.2 earthquake struck Central Java, Indonesia on November 21. A construction worker died when he fell from a building.
- A magnitude 5.7 earthquake struck the Hindu Kush region of Afghanistan on November 22 at a depth of 102.0 km (63.4 mi). A woman and her child were killed when their house collapsed in Khyber Pakhtunkhwa, Pakistan, and dozens of houses were destroyed in Afghanistan.
- A magnitude 5.1 earthquake struck Venezuela 16 km (9.9 mi) west of Ejido in the state of Mérida on November 22 at a depth of 10.0 km (6.2 mi). One man was killed by rockfalls triggered by the earthquake.
- A magnitude 5.6 earthquake struck Mexico 10 km (6.2 mi) northeast of La Concordia in the state of Guerrero on November 23 at a depth of 34.0 km (21.1 mi). Two workers were killed, buried by a mudslide.
- A magnitude 6.0 earthquake struck offshore of the United States territory of the Northern Mariana Islands 42 km (26 mi) west of Agrihan on November 24 at a depth of 586.9 km (364.7 mi).
- A magnitude 7.6 earthquake struck Peru 155 km (96 mi) west northwest of Iñapari on November 24 at a depth of 606.2 km (376.7 mi). Many buildings were evacuated due to the shaking, and some houses suffered light damage in Manaus, Brazil.
- A magnitude 7.6 earthquake struck Peru 185 km (115 mi) west northwest of Iñapari on November 24 at a depth of 620.6 km (385.6 mi). This was probably a doublet of the 7.6 magnitude quake earlier.
- A magnitude 6.7 earthquake struck Brazil 125 km (78 mi) south southwest of Tarauacá on November 26 at a depth of 602.8 km (374.6 mi). This was an aftershock of the 7.6 magnitude quake in Peru.
- A magnitude 6.2 earthquake struck Chile 65 km (40 mi) north of Taltal on November 27 at a depth of 34.0 km (21.1 mi).
- A magnitude 4.9 earthquake struck Turkey 8 km (5.0 mi) southeast of Kuluncak on November 29 at a depth of 10.0 km (6.2 mi). One child injured, more than 744 homes collapsed and 2,991 others damaged in the Hekimhan-Kuluncak area.

=== December ===
December
- Strongest: 7.2 M_{w}, Tajikistan
- Deadliest: 6.3 M_{w}, Afghanistan; 4 deaths
- Total fatalities: 8

Number by magnitude
- 8.0–8.9: 0
- 7.0–7.9: 2
- 6.0–6.9: 7
- 5.0–5.9: 105
- 4.0–4.9: 608

- A magnitude 5.4 earthquake struck Turkey 17 km (11 mi) east northeast of Yayladere on December 2 at a depth of 10.0 km (6.2 mi). More than 500 homes were heavily damaged in Kiğı District.
- A magnitude 7.1 earthquake struck the Southeast Indian Ridge on December 4 at a depth of 35.0 km (21.7 mi).
- A magnitude 7.2 earthquake struck Tajikistan 104 km (65 mi) west of Murghab on December 7 at a depth of 22.0 km (13.7 mi). One truck driver and a policeman were killed while dozens more were injured and 500 homes destroyed. The earthquake was also felt in Kyrgyzstan, Afghanistan, Pakistan, Kazakhstan and India.
- A magnitude 5.5 earthquake struck Kyrgyzstan 116 km (72 mi) south southeast of Sosnovka on December 8 at a depth of 21.5 km (13.4 mi). One school destroyed in Ming-Kush and 85 structures damaged in the Bazar-Korgon-Jumgal area.
- A magnitude 6.9 earthquake struck Indonesia 107 km (66 mi) southeast of Amahai in central Maluku province on December 9 at a depth of 21.0 km (13.0 mi).
- A magnitude 6.1 earthquake struck offshore of Fiji 253 km (157 mi) west northwest of Lautoka on December 9 at a depth of 10.0 km (6.2 mi).
- A magnitude 6.6 earthquake struck Mexico 4 km (2.5 mi) west of Manuel Ávila Camacho in the state of Chiapas on December 17 at a depth of 85.0 km (52.8 mi). Two people were killed by a landslide in Cocotitlan and damage to buildings in eight municipalities near the epicenter.
- A magnitude 6.0 earthquake struck offshore of Vanuatu 128 km (80 mi) north of Isangel on December 19 at a depth of 10.0 km (6.2 mi).
- A magnitude 6.1 earthquake struck Indonesia 37 km (23 mi) north of Tarakan in North Kalimantan province on December 20 at a depth of 14.0 km (8.7 mi). At least seven houses were damaged, two of them collapsed.
- A magnitude 6.2 earthquake struck the southern East Pacific Rise on December 24 at a depth of 12.3 km (7.6 mi).
- A magnitude 6.3 earthquake struck Afghanistan 42 km (26 mi) west southwest of Ashkāsham in Badakhshan province on December 25 at a depth of 206.0 km (128.0 mi). 12 people were hospitalized in Nangarhar province, including some university students in Jalalabad, who were injured in a stampede while trying to escape a building. Four people were killed in Pakistan. At least 100 people were injured. The quake was also strongly felt in Tajikistan and India.
