= African Great Lakes =

Series of lakes in the Rift Valley

- Maziwa Makuu (Swahili); Ibiyaga bigari (Kinyarwanda)
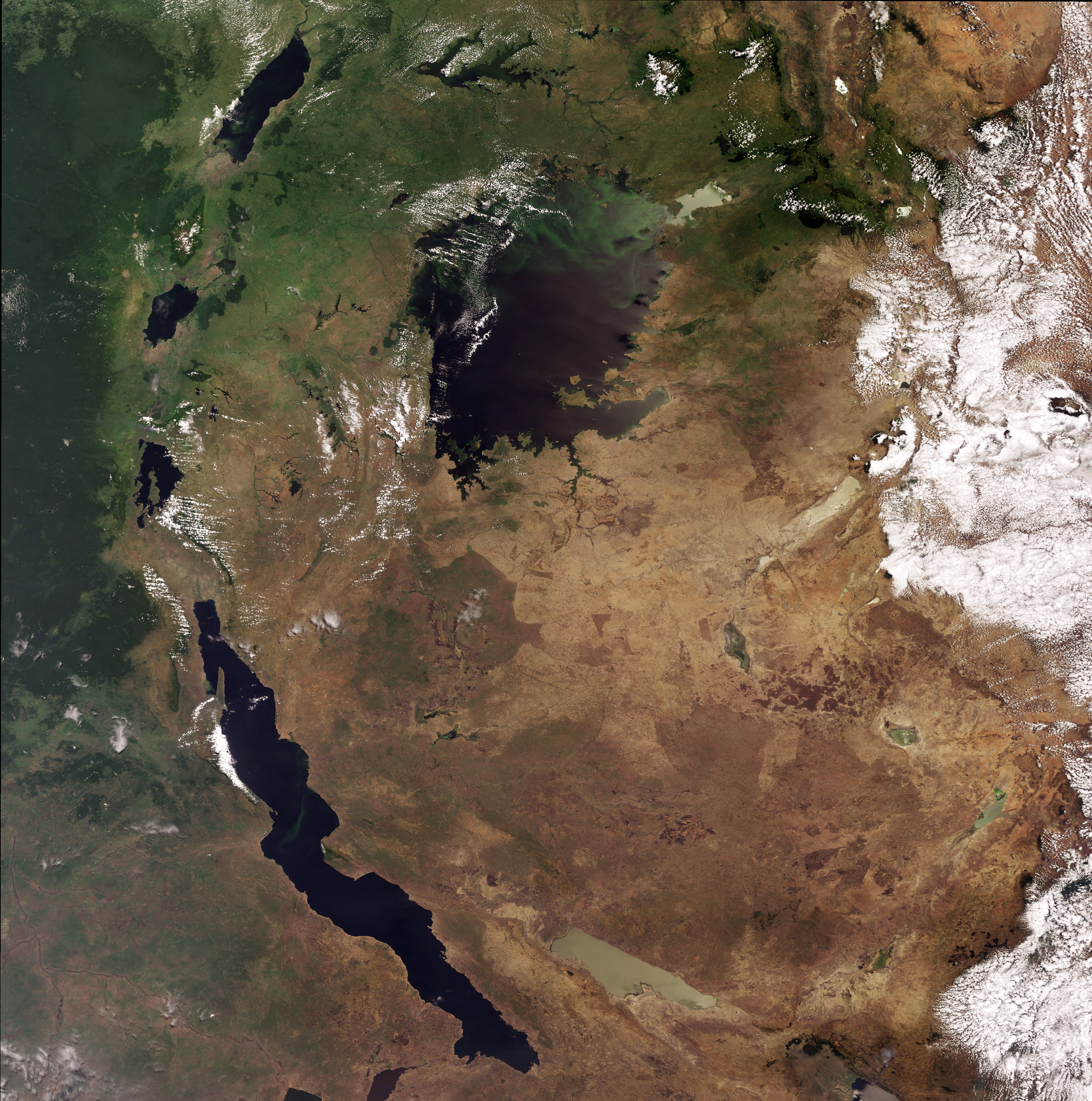
- Satellite view of the African Great Lakes region and its coastline

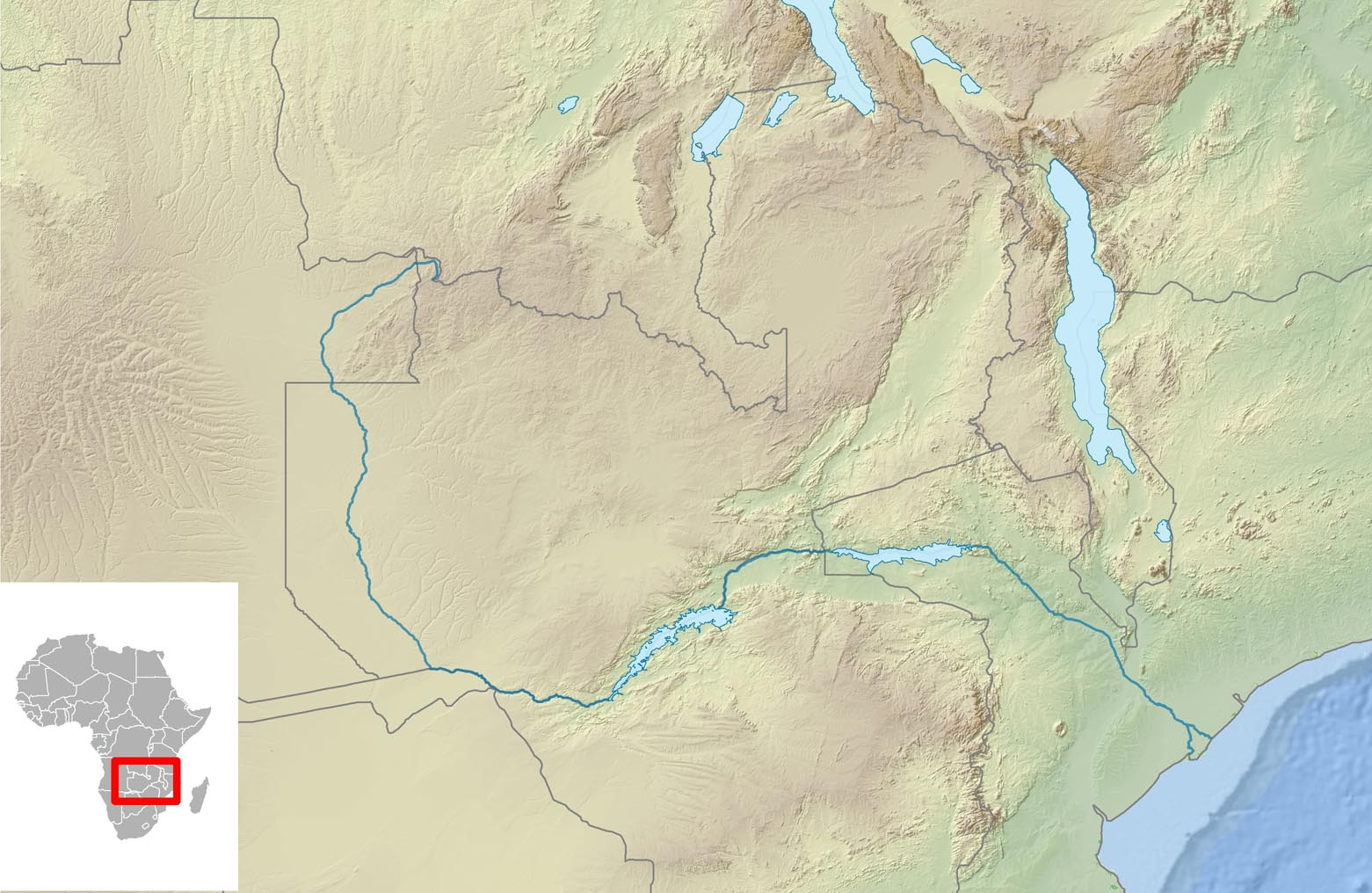
- Location within Zambezi River Location within Africa
- Coordinates: 8°00′00″S 35°00′00″E
- Type: Freshwater lakes
- Part of: East African Rift
- Primary outflows: White Nile river, Congo river, Shire river
- Basin countries: Burundi, the Democratic Republic of the Congo, Ethiopia, Kenya, Malawi, Mozambique, Rwanda, Zambia, Tanzania, and Uganda
- Water volume: 31,000 cubic kilometres (7,400 cu mi)
- Max. temperature: 35 °C (95 °F)
- Min. temperature: 17 to 19 °C (63 to 66 °F)

The African Great Lakes system, in blue

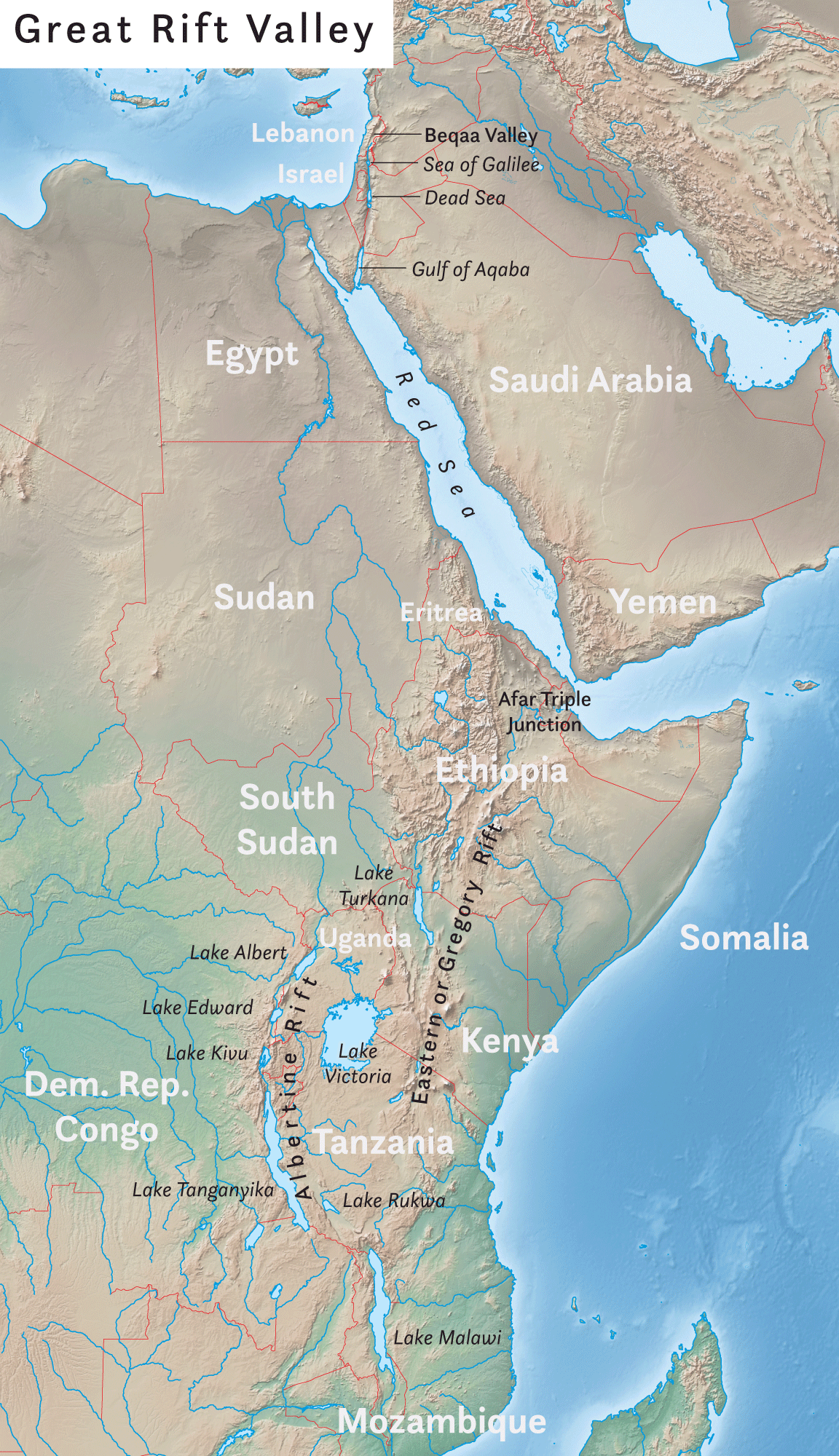
Map of larger region including the East African Rift and the Great Rift Valley

The African Great Lakes (Swahili: Maziwa Makuu; Kinyarwanda: Ibiyaga bigari) are a series of lakes constituting the part of the Rift Valley lakes in and around the East African Rift. The series includes Lake Victoria, the second-largest freshwater lake in the world by area; Lake Tanganyika, the world's second-largest freshwater lake by volume and depth; Lake Malawi, the world's fourth-largest freshwater lake by volume; and Lake Turkana, the world's largest permanent desert lake and the world's largest alkaline lake. Collectively, they contain 31,000 km^{3} (7,400 mi^{3}) of water, which is more than either Lake Baikal or the North American Great Lakes. This total constitutes about 25% of the planet's unfrozen surface fresh water. The large rift lakes of Africa are the ancient home of great biodiversity, and 10% of the world's fish species live in this region.

Countries in the area which are bounded by the lakes of the Great Lakes region include Burundi, the Democratic Republic of the Congo, Ethiopia, Kenya, Malawi, Mozambique, Rwanda, Tanzania, Uganda and Zambia.

== Lakes and drainage basins ==
The following are included on most lists of the African Great Lakes, grouped by drainage basin. The exact number of lakes considered part of the African Great Lakes varies by list, and may include smaller lakes in the rift valleys, especially if they are part of the same drainage basin as the larger lakes, such as Lake Kyoga.

Lakes that drain into the White Nile:

- Lake Victoria
- Lake Kyoga (part of the Great Lakes system but not itself a "great lake")
- Lake Albert
- Lake Edward

Lakes that drain into the Congo River:

- Lake Tanganyika
- Lake Kivu
- Lake Mweru
- Lake Bangweulu

Lake that drains into the Zambezi:

- Lake Malawi, via the Shire River

Lakes with closed basins:

- Lake Turkana
- Lake Rukwa

== African Great Lakes region ==
The Great Lakes region (rarely: Greater Lakes region) consists of ten riparian countries: Burundi, the Democratic Republic of the Congo, Ethiopia, Kenya, Malawi, Mozambique, Rwanda, Tanzania, Uganda, and Zambia. The adjective interlacustrine ("between lakes") can refer to the region, or more specifically, the nations or area bounded by the lakes.

The Swahili language is the most commonly spoken language in the African Great Lakes region. It also serves as a national or official language of five nations in the region: Tanzania, Kenya, Uganda, Rwanda, and the Democratic Republic of the Congo.

Because of its high population—estimated to be more than 50 million people in 2020—and the agricultural surplus in the region, the area became organized into a number of small states. The most powerful of these monarchies were Buganda, Bunyoro, Karagwe, Rwanda, and Burundi.

Being the long-sought source of the Nile and the watershed triple point between the rivers Nile, Congo and Zambezi, the region had long been of interest to Europeans. The first Europeans to arrive in the region in any numbers were Christian missionaries who had limited success in converting the locals, but did open the region to later colonization. Increased contact with the rest of the world led to a series of devastating epidemics affecting both humans and livestock.

While seen as a region with great potential after independence, the Great Lakes region has suffered from civil war and conflict in the four decades around the turn of the 21st century (c. 1980–2020). In 2022, the United Nations High Commissioner for Refugees commended Tanzania for consistently welcoming and aiding refugees from other countries in the region.

== Climate ==
The highlands are relatively cool, with average temperatures ranging between 17 °C (63 °F) and 19 °C (66 °F) and abundant rainfall. Major drainage basins include those of the Congo-Zaire, Nile, and Zambezi rivers, which drain into the Atlantic Ocean, Mediterranean Sea, and Indian Ocean, respectively.

Forests are dominant in the lowlands of the Congo-Zaire Basin, while grasslands and savannas (dry grasslands) are most common in the southern and eastern highlands. Temperatures in the lowlands average about 35 °C (95 °F). Around Lake Turkana, the climate is hot and very dry. A short rainy season in October is followed by a longer one from April to May.

== Flora and fauna ==
The Western Rift Valley lakes are freshwater and home to an extraordinary number of endemic species. More than 1,500 cichlid fish species live in the lakes, as well as other fish families. The lakes are also important habitats for a number of amphibian species. Nile crocodiles are numerous. Mammals include elephants, gorillas and hippopotamus.

The Lake Turkana area is home to hundreds of species of birds endemic to Kenya. The flamingo wades in its shallows. The East African rift system also serves as a flyway for migrating birds, bringing in hundreds more. The birds are essentially supported by plankton masses in the lake, which also feed the fish there.

Vegetation ranges from rainforest to savanna grasses. In some lakes, rapidly growing invasive plants, like the surface-choking water hyacinth and shore-clogging papyrus, are problems. Water hyacinth have thus far affected only Lake Victoria.

== Geology ==
Until 12 million years ago, the bountiful waters of the equatorial plateau either flowed west into the Congo River system or east to the Indian Ocean. This was changed by the formation of the Great Rift Valley. A rift is a weak place in Earth's crust due to the separation of two tectonic plates, often accompanied by a graben, or trough, in which lake water can collect. This rift began when East Africa, impelled by currents in the mantle, began separating from the rest of Africa, moving to the northeast. The basins that resulted from the geological uplifts filled with water that now flowed north.

Lake Victoria is not actually within the Rift Valley. It occupies a depression between the Eastern and Western Rifts, formed by the uplift of the rifts to either of its sides.

== Archaeology ==
Around two to three million years ago, Lake Turkana was larger and the area more fertile, making it a center for early hominids. Richard Leakey led numerous anthropological excavations in the area, which yielded many important discoveries of hominin remains. The two-million-year-old Skull 1470 was found in 1972. It was originally thought to be Homo habilis, but some anthropologists have assigned it to a new species, Homo rudolfensis, named after the lake (previously known as Lake Rudolf). In 1984, the Turkana Boy, a nearly complete skeleton of a Homo erectus boy was discovered. In 1999, a 3,500,000-year-old skull was discovered there, named Kenyanthropus platyops, which means "flat-faced man of Kenya".

== Economy ==
Fishing—primarily of tilapia species but also of Nile perch—provides the main livelihood for people in the region. With four Great Lakes on its borders, Uganda ranks as one of the world's largest producers of freshwater fish. The climate and rich volcanic soils in the highlands also sustain intensely cultivated croplands.

The economies of the Great Lakes region states have different structures and are at various stages of development. The GDP real growth rate ranges from 1.8 percent in Burundi to 4.4 in the DRC. GDP per capita fluctuates between $600 in DRC and Burundi and $800 in Uganda.

== See also ==
- 2005 Lake Tanganyika earthquake
- 2008 Lake Kivu earthquake
- East African Plateau
- Great Lakes refugee crisis
- List of lakes
- List of lakes by area
- Rift Valley lakes
