= 2016 Tanzania earthquake =

Earthquake in the Tanzania–Uganda border in September 2016

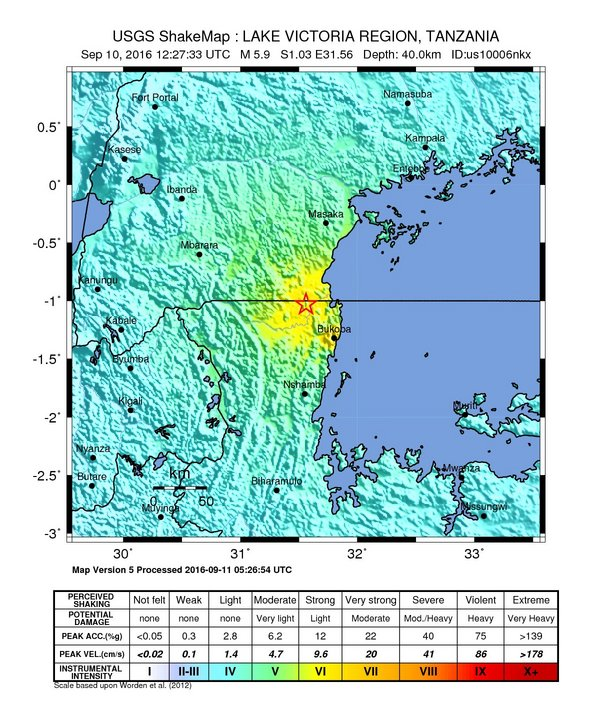
- USGS shakemap for the event

- Location within Tanzania
- UTC time: 2016-09-10 12:27:33
- ISC event: 609439041
- USGS-ANSS: ComCat
- Local date: 10 September 2016
- Local time: 15:27 EAT (UTC+3)
- Magnitude: 5.9 M_{w}
- Depth: 40.0 km (24.9 mi)
- Epicenter: 1.029°S 31.568°E
- Areas affected: Burundi; Democratic Republic of Congo; Kenya; Rwanda; Tanzania; Uganda
- Max. intensity: MMI VII (Very strong)
- Casualties: 23 dead 260 injured

A magnitude 5.9 earthquake struck Tanzania 27 km (17 mi) east northeast of Nsunga, Kagera Region on 10 September at a depth of 40 km (25 mi). The shock had a maximum intensity of VII (Very strong). Nineteen people were killed and 253 injured in Tanzania, while four people were killed in Kamuli and seven others were injured in the Rakai District of neighbouring Uganda.

== Tectonic setting ==
The 5.9 magnitude earthquake near the west shore of Lake Victoria in northern Tanzania occurred as the result of shallow oblique faulting within the lithosphere of the African plate. The focal mechanism solution for the earthquake indicates rupture occurred on a moderately dipping fault striking either northeast–southwest (right-lateral slip) or east–west (left-lateral slip).

The location of the earthquake broadly places it in the East African Rift System, a 3,000-km-long Cenozoic age continental rift extending from the Afar triple junction (between the horn of Africa and the Middle East), to Mozambique. In this context, this earthquake is some 200 km or more to the east of the West Branch of the Rift System, which runs along the border between the Democratic Republic of the Congo and both Uganda (in the north) and Tanzania (to the south). The East Branch of the Rift System runs north-to-south through Kenya and Tanzania, several hundred kilometers to the east of the earthquake. The Victoria microplate lies between these two branches of the rift, and helps to accommodate the dominantly divergent (extensional) tectonics of the Rift System, where rift segments are connected by dominantly strike-slip transform faults. The earthquake is consistent with this mixed divergent and strike slip setting, and occurred somewhat centrally within that microplate, in an area with little to no recorded earthquakes over the past century.

Historically, seismicity in the East African Rift is mainly concentrated along the branches of the rift system (i.e., at the edges of the Victoria microplate, and along the main rift running through Ethiopia in the north, and Malawi and Mozambique in the south). Over the preceding century, only one other earthquake has been recorded within 100 km of the earthquake – a M 4.3 event in Lake Victoria in December 2013. Further afield, 22 M6+ events have occurred within 500 km of the earthquake over the preceding century, most on the Western Branch of the Rift System to the west of this earthquake. These include a M 6.6 earthquake in March 1966 near Lake Edward on the Uganda-DRC border. Tanzania's largest historic earthquake over this time period was a M 7.2 event in July 1919, near Lake Tanganyika in the west of the country. A M 6.8 earthquake near the center of Lake Tanganyika in December 2005 resulted in half a dozen or more fatalities.

== Earthquake ==
The 5.9 M_{w} earthquake was located in the Tanzania–Uganda border, and was felt as far away as Rwanda and Burundi. It was the largest earthquake in Tanzania since 2000, and is one of the deadliest.

== Casualties and damage ==
At least 19 people were killed and 253 others injured in Tanzania, with most of the casualties occurring in the town of Bukoba, which suffered widespread damage. In the immediate aftermath of the quake, the main hospital was reported to be stretched beyond its capacity and running low on stocks of medicine, while electricity and telecommunication services were disrupted. On 12 September, the Tanzanian Prime Minister Kassim Majaliwa's office reported at least 840 houses were destroyed by the quake, with another 1,264 seriously damaged, rendering thousands of people homeless.

In Uganda, the most affected area was the Kyebe sub-county near Kakuuto, where about 78 houses collapsed at Minziiro, and more than 40 others at Kannabulemu, including a police post. At least four people were killed and seven others were injured across the country.

The tremor was also felt in Burundi, DRC, Kenya and Rwanda.

=== Response ===
Members of the Tanzanian Red Cross took part in relief and rescue operations after the quake, aided by volunteers from across the country, as well as from neighbouring Uganda and Kenya.

The President of Tanzania John Magufuli postponed a visit to Zambia to take charge of the government's relief efforts, while his Kenyan counterpart Uhuru Kenyatta expressed solidarity with the people of Tanzania and ordered the Kenya Defence Forces to airlift iron sheets, blankets and mattresses in response to the disaster.

== See also ==
- List of earthquakes in 2016
- List of earthquakes in Tanzania
- 1966 Toro earthquake
- 2005 Lake Tanganyika earthquake
