= December 2015 Hindu Kush earthquake =

Earthquake

- Location within Afghanistan
- UTC time: 2015-12-25 19:14:47
- ISC event: 612128431
- USGS-ANSS: ComCat
- Local date: 25 December 2015
- Local time: 23:44:47
- Magnitude: 6.3 M_{w}
- Depth: 203.4 km (126.4 mi)
- Epicenter: 36.486°N 71.138°E
- Areas affected: Afghanistan; Pakistan; India
- Max. intensity: MMI V (Moderate)
- Casualties: 4 deaths, 100+ injuries

The December 2015 Hindu Kush earthquake occurred with a moment magnitude of 6.3 in South Asia on 25 December 2015. One woman was killed in Pakistan. At least 100 people were injured in Pakistan and Afghanistan. The quake was also strongly felt in Tajikistan and India. The epicenter of the earthquake was in the Afghanistan-Tajikistan border region at a depth of 203.4 km.

== Background ==
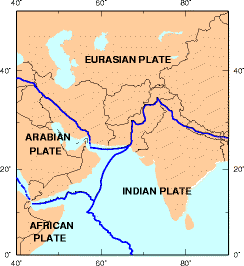
Map depicting regional tectonic plates

Region	Number of deaths	Number of injuries
(Pakistan) Khyber Pakhtunkhwa	3	83
(Pakistan) Gilgit-Baltistan	1	5
(Afghanistan) Nangarhar Province		12
Total	4	100

An earthquake of 7.3 M_{w} was felt in the same region in October 2015 causing 398 deaths and 2,536 injuries in Pakistan and Afghanistan.

The Himalayan mountains are pushed up by the collision of tectonic plates, making them prone to devastating quakes. An earthquake in April 2015, Nepal's worst in 80 years, killed over 8,600 people.

The last major earthquake in the same region of similar magnitude (7.6 M_{w}) was almost ten years prior in October 2005, which resulted in 87,351 deaths, 75,266 injured, 2.8 million people being displaced, and 250,000 farm animals deaths. The notable difference between this earthquake and the 2005 earthquake is the depth of the seismic activity. The 2005 earthquake was 15 km deep while this earthquake was 203.4 km deep, reducing its effects at the surface.

In recent studies, geologists claim that global warming is one of the reasons for increased seismic activity. According to these studies melting glaciers and rising sea levels disturb the balance of pressure on Earth's tectonic plates thus causing an increase in the frequency and intensity of earthquakes. This could be one of the reasons why the Himalayas are getting more prone to earthquakes in recent years.

== See also ==
- April 2015 Nepal earthquake
- List of earthquakes in 2015
- List of earthquakes in Pakistan
- Thrust tectonics
