= 2015 Illapel earthquake =

8.3 magnitude quake in Chile

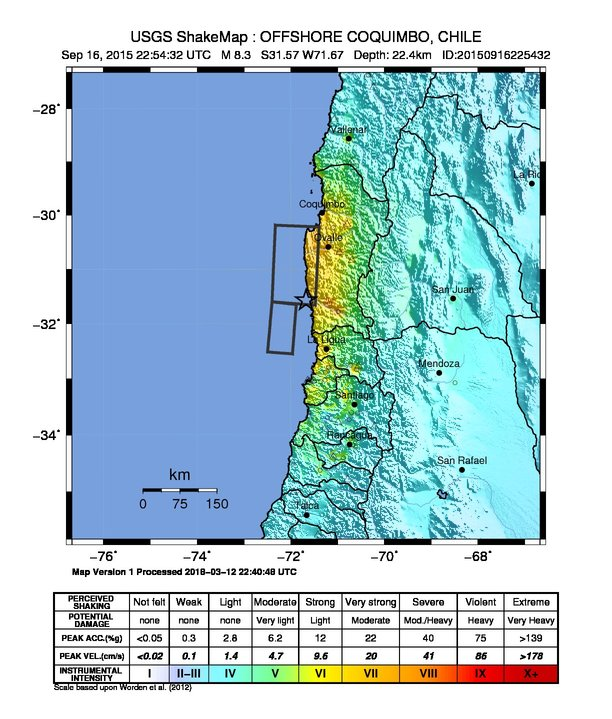
- USGS ShakeMap of the earthquake
- UTC time: 2015-09-16 22:54:32
- ISC event: 611531714
- USGS-ANSS: ComCat
- Local date: September 16, 2015
- Local time: 19:54:32 CST (UTC-3)
- Duration: 2 minutes
- Magnitude: 8.3–8.4 M_{w}
- Depth: 22.4 km (USGS)
- Epicenter: 31.570°S 71.654°W
- Areas affected: Chile; Argentina
- Total damage: US$600–900 million
- Max. intensity: MMI IX (Violent)
- Tsunami: Yes, (13.6 m or 44.6 ft)
- Aftershocks: 31 of 6.0 M_{w} or higher, over 5,000 in total (as of June 2017)
- Casualties: 15 dead, 34 injured, 6 missing and 16,646 homeless in Chile; 1 fatality and minor injuries in Argentina

The 2015 Illapel earthquake occurred 46 km (29 mi) offshore from Illapel (Coquimbo region, Chile) on 16 September 2015 at 19:54:32 Chile Standard Time (22:54:32 UTC), with a moment magnitude of 8.3–8.4. The initial quake lasted between three and five minutes; it was followed by several aftershocks greater than magnitude six and two that exceeded magnitude seven. The Chilean government reported 15 deaths, 6 missing and thousands of people affected. In Buenos Aires, Argentina, a man died from a stroke while he was evacuating a building.

== Earthquake ==
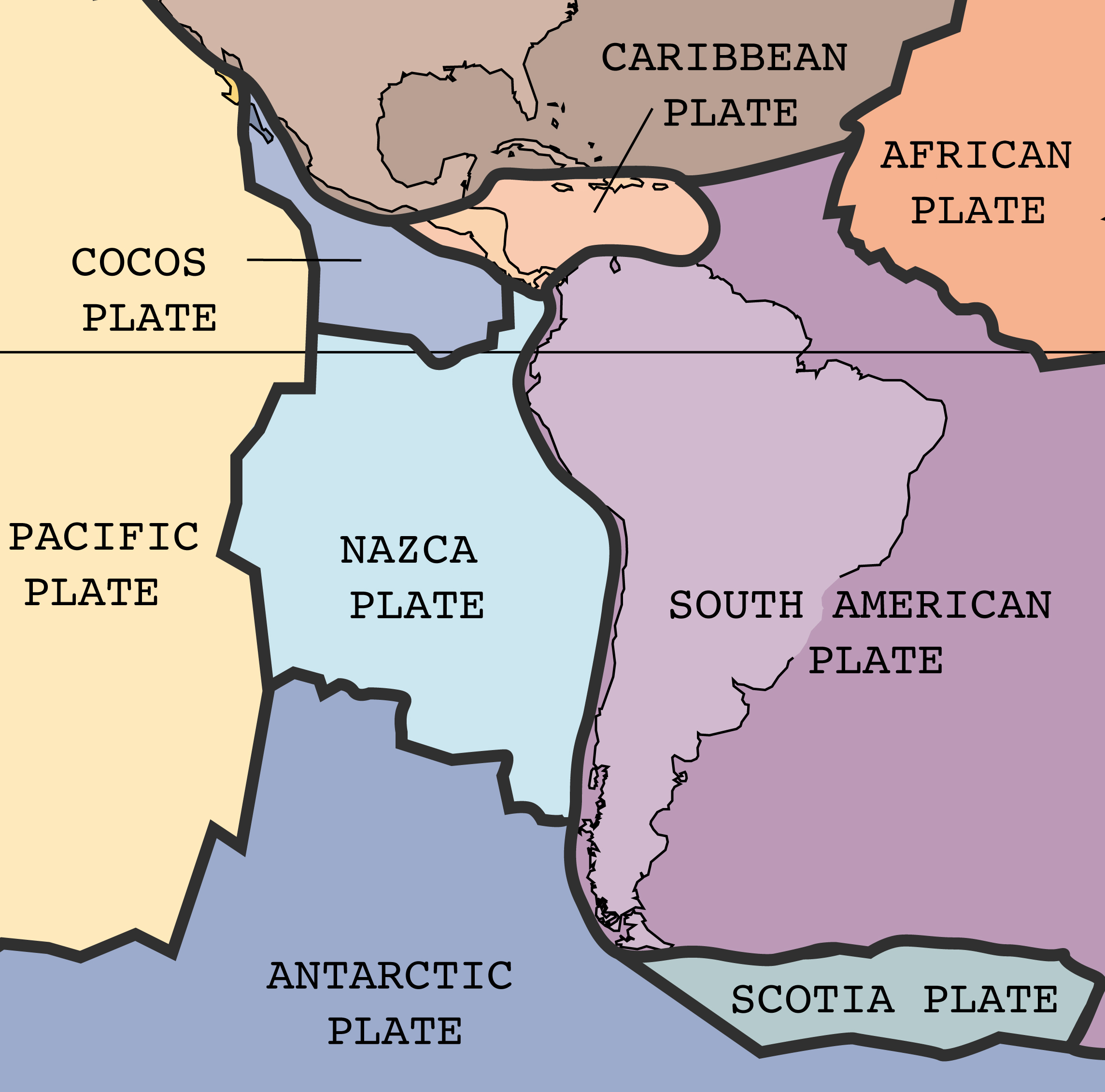
The process of subduction of the Nazca plate under the South American plate.

The earthquake occurred on thrust faults along the boundary of the Nazca and South American plates. The region frequently produces large earthquakes, and 15 others of magnitude 7 or higher have taken place within 400 km of the epicenter over the past 100 years. The last big quake that occurred in this region was the 1943 Ovalle earthquake, reaching a magnitude in the range 7.9–8.2; however, comparisons of the associated source time function (the time history of release of seismic moment) show that the 2015 event was significantly larger than the 1943 earthquake, in terms of duration, up-dip rupture extent and tsunami size.

== Damage and range ==
Illapel, an inland city of 30,000 residents, was reported immediately to be without electricity or drinking water. Many towns and small cities in the Coquimbo region saw a lot of damage, where the earthquake was felt with an intensity of VIII Mercalli. Two days after the quake, about 90,000 people were still without electricity. On September 21, officials were reporting over 9,000 people had been left homeless by the quake.

Tall buildings swayed and car alarms were set off in Buenos Aires, 1,110 kilometres (690 mi) away, and the earthquake was felt in São Paulo, more than 2,600 kilometres (1,600 mi) away. The Argentine provinces of Mendoza, San Juan, Córdoba, Tucumán, La Rioja, San Luis and Santa Fe were also affected. The AIR Worldwide put the insurance loss to 400–600 billion CLP (US$600–900 million), while Fitch Ratings estimated the economic loss was about US$100–1,000 million.

== Tsunami ==
Tsunami watches, warnings, and advisories were issued in Ecuador, Peru, New Zealand, Fiji, Solomon Islands, Hawaii, California and Japan. The first tsunami waves arrived on the Chilean coast within minutes. A series of waves reaching at least 4.5 m (15 ft) high were observed along the coast of Coquimbo and the cities of Coquimbo, Tongoy and Concón nearby to Valparaíso reported flooding; large fishing vessels were swept into the streets of Coquimbo, which reported heavy damage. The port of Coquimbo, along with the Costanera, was heavily damaged. The tsunami also damaged the iconic La Serena monumental lighthouse. The largest waves hit the uninhabited beach of La Cebada, running up to 13.6 m (45 ft). Waves up to 10.8 m (35 ft) also hit the small village of Totoral. Because of the remote location of the largest waves, this event caused comparatively less widespread devastation than other tsunamis of this size.

In the coastal city of Tongoy, large areas along the sea front were destroyed, along with the Tongoy beach itself, which was heavily affected by both earthquake and tsunami. Across the region at least 500 buildings were destroyed, while dozens of beachfront homes in Los Vilos were damaged or destroyed. A state of emergency was declared in Coquimbo a day after the tsunami, with troops to be deployed to the area.

=== Evacuations ===
Chilean authorities ordered the immediate evacuation of the coast due to tsunami risk, with many people in coastal areas receiving automatic notices by cellphone shortly after the quake. The undersecretary for the ministry of the interior and public security reported that the evacuation affected one million people across the country.

Although causing significant damage, the Illapel earthquake's low death toll relative to the 525 casualties of the significantly more powerful 2010 Chile earthquake was credited, in part, to its occurrence in a less populated region, better coastal preparedness and an improved tsunami warning system, the longstanding enforcement of seismic building codes, and an improved emergency response.

Damage in Coquimbo
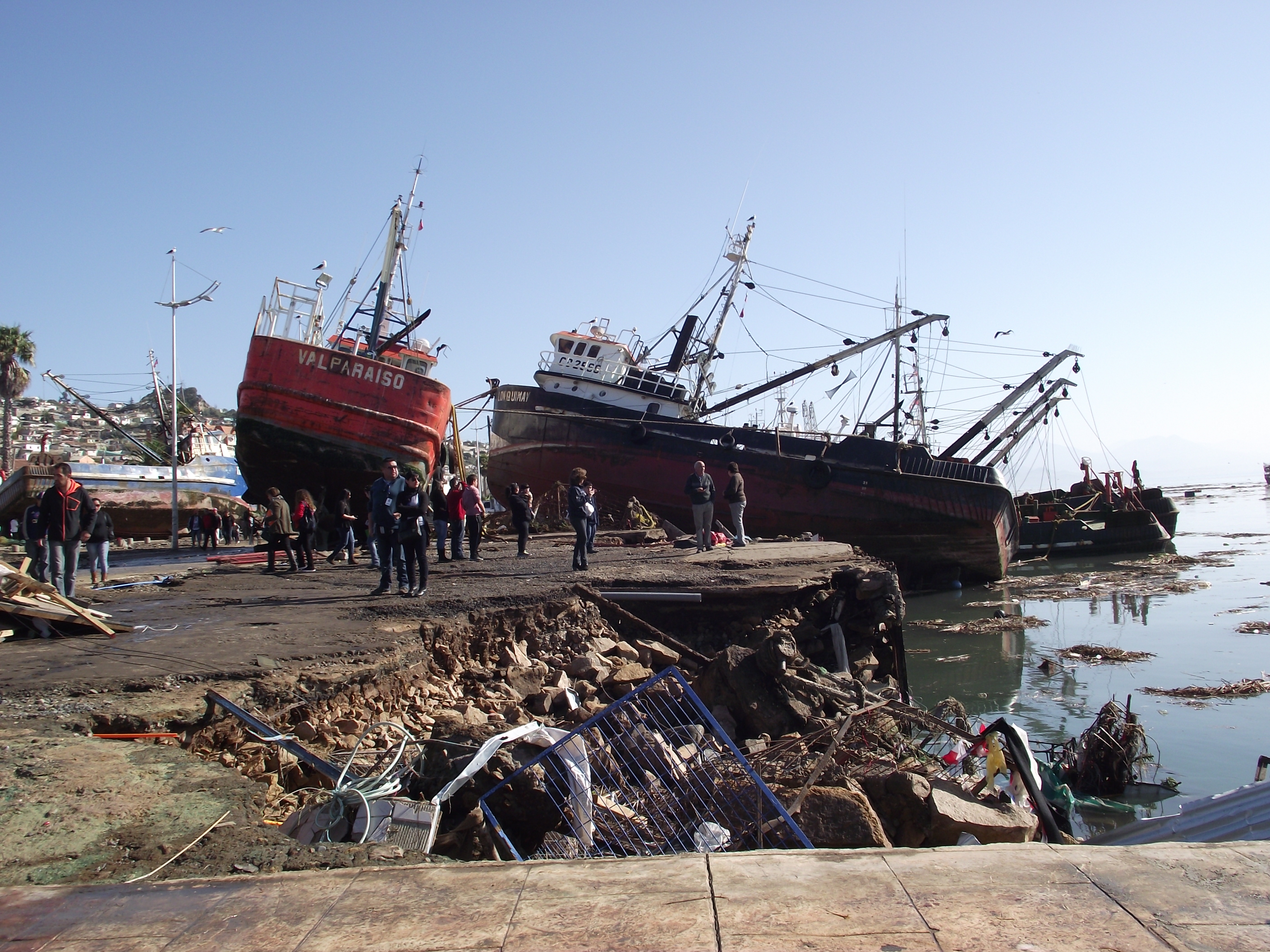
Boats stranded in Coquimbo after the tsunami

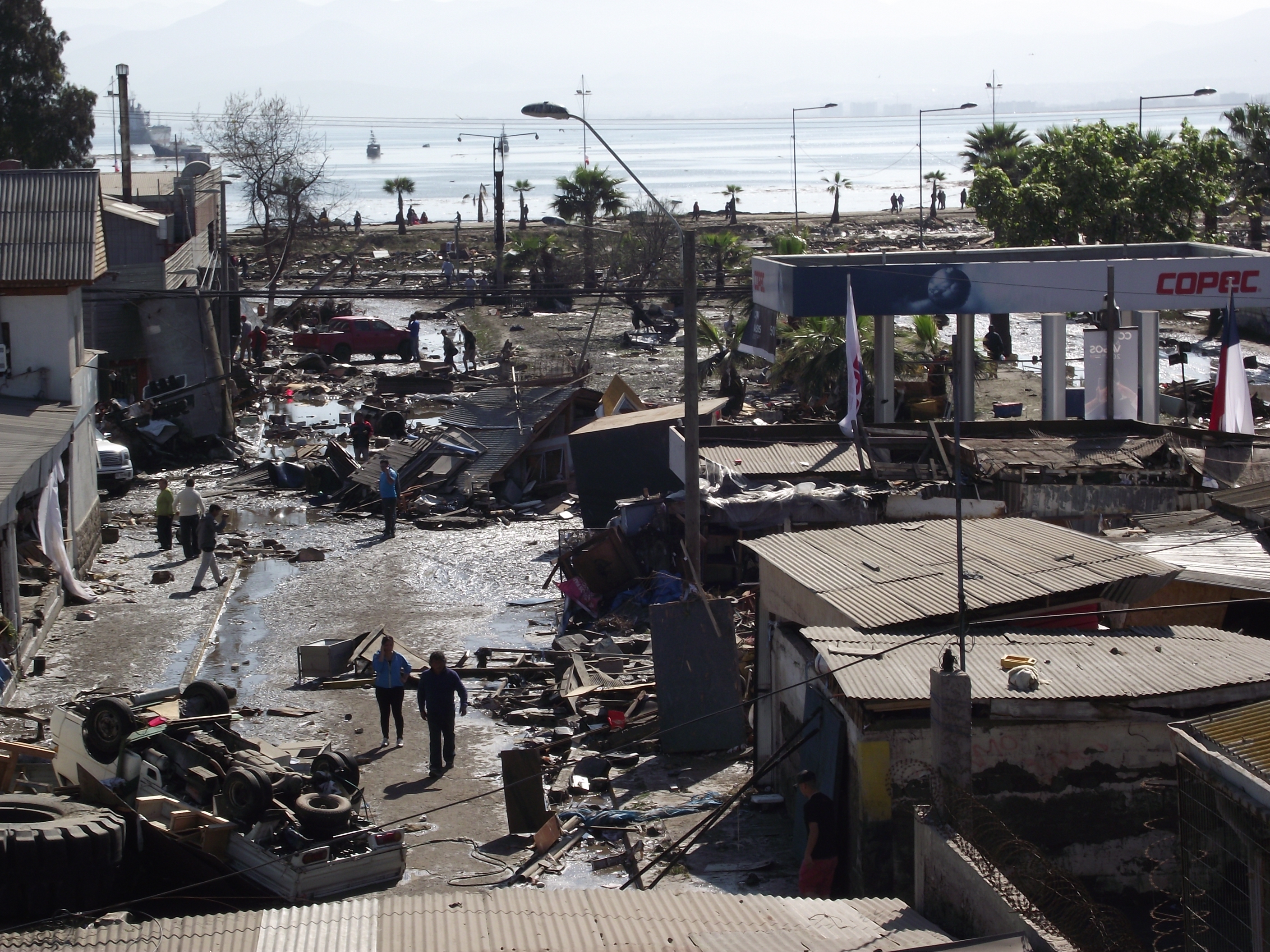
Street scene near the coast in Coquimbo in the quake and tsunami aftermath.

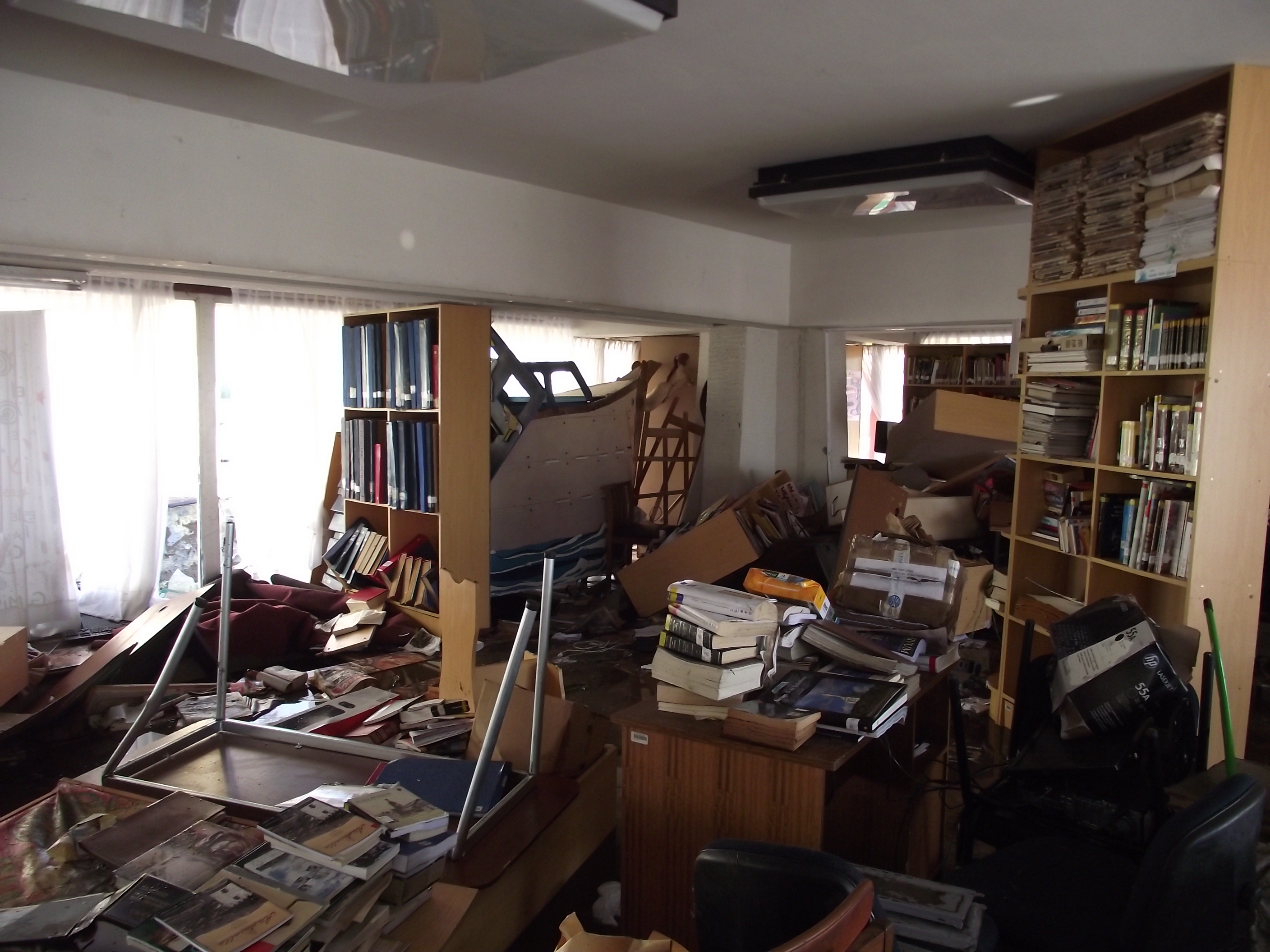
Coquimbo municipal library, after the tsunami

== See also ==
- 2010 Chile earthquake
- List of earthquakes in 2015
- List of earthquakes in Chile
