= List of earthquakes in the Democratic Republic of the Congo =

This is a list of earthquakes in the Democratic Republic of the Congo which directly impacted the country.

== Earthquakes ==
Date	Location	MMI	Mag.	Deaths	Injuries	Damage / notes	Ref
2021-06-10	Bukavu, Lake Kivu	V	5.0 M_{w}	2	10		
2021-05-24	North Kivu		4.7 M_{w}	1		Part of earthquake swarm	
2015-08-07	South Kivu	VII	5.8 M_{w}	3	30		
2008-02-03	South Kivu	VIII	5.9 M_{w}	44	349	Severe	
2005-12-05	Tanganyika	X	6.8 M_{w}	6			
2002-10-24	Lake Kivu	VII	6.2 M_{w}	2			
2002-01-17	North Kivu	IV	4.7 M_{w}	7		Severe damage/Part of earthquake swarm	
1992-09-11	Kabalo, Tanganyika	VII	6.4 M_{w}	8	37	Several buildings destroyed	
1966-03-20	Lake Albert	VIII	6.8 M_{w}	157		Severe damage	
1960-09-22	Lake Kivu	VIII	6.3 M_{w}			Doublet	
1960-09-22	Lake Kivu	VIII	6.5 M_{w}			Doublet	
Note: The inclusion criteria for adding events are based on WikiProject Earthquakes' notability guideline that was developed for stand alone articles. The principles described also apply to lists. In summary, only damaging, injurious, or deadly events should be recorded.

== See also ==
- List of earthquakes in Algeria
- List of earthquakes in Egypt
- List of earthquakes in Morocco
