= 2015 Lefkada earthquake =

Earthquake in Greece

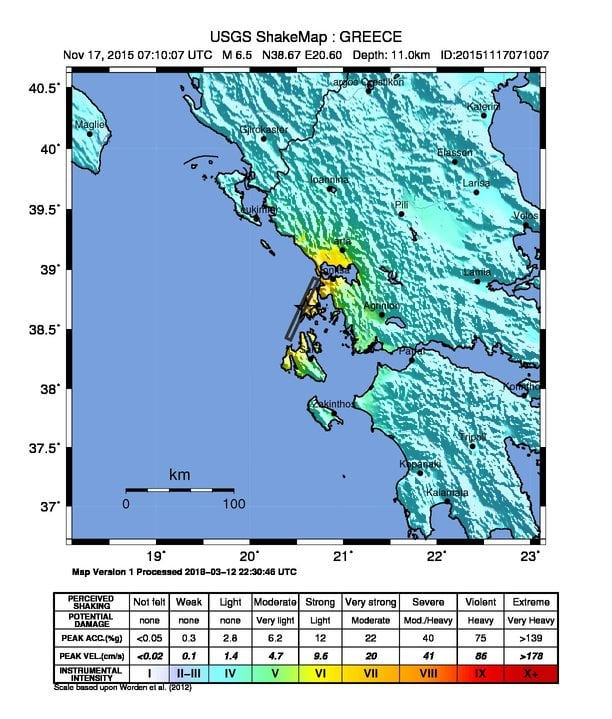

- Location within Greece
- UTC time: 2015-11-17 07:10:07
- ISC event: 612296376
- USGS-ANSS: ComCat
- Local date: 17 November 2015
- Local time: 10:40:07 (EEST)
- Magnitude: 6.5 M_{w}
- Depth: 11.0 km (6.8 mi)
- Epicenter: 38.670°N 20.600°E
- Fault: Hellenic arc
- Type: Strike-slip
- Areas affected: Greece
- Max. intensity: MMI VIII (Severe)
- Peak acceleration: 0.41 g in Chortata
- Landslides: Landslides hit the western coast of Lefkada Island, one of the worst was in Egremni Beach and in Gialos Beach.
- Casualties: 2 fatalities, 4–8 injured

The 2015 Lefkada earthquake occurred on November 17, 2015, 10:40:07 (EEST) with a moment magnitude of 6.5 located 19 km Southwest of the Greek island of Lefkada along with a depth of 11 km and intensities reaching as high as VIII (Severe) on the Modified Mercalli Scale. Two people lost their lives in the event and 4–8 others were hospitalized with injuries.

== Earthquake ==
The earthquake struck west of Lefkada island with initial magnitudes of between 6.3 and 6.7 however it was later settled to 6.5 according to the United States Geological Survey. The earthquake was generated by a strike-slip rupture on the Cephalonia-Lefkada Transform Fault, which also produced earthquakes in 2003 and 1973. The Hellenic arc is known for its frequent seismological activity and generating historically large quakes in all of Southeastern Europe. Lefkada is located at the boundary between two geological zones, the Ionian and Paxos. This boundary runs through the western outcrops onshore the island, forming the noteworthy Ionian Thrust.

== Damage ==
=== Lefkada and other Ionian Islands ===
Most damage was observed in western Lefkada as well ground cracks, slope movements and liquefaction found in the area. Primary effects directly linked to surface expression of the seismological source were not detected in the field. A maximum intensity of VIII was assigned areas where to large-volume slope movements occurred, along the western Lefkas coast. Intensity VIII were also assigned to the villages located in Dragano and Athani due to very heavy structural damage observed on masonry buildings, churches and other weak infrastructure mainly attributed to the combination of the recorded high PGA values, the poor anti-seismic design and construction of buildings and the geological and tectonic structure of the affected area. Damage to buildings was mainly observed in these villages arranged almost parallel to the northern segment of the Cephalonia-Lefkada Transform fault. Among not earthquake proof structures, stone masonry buildings and monumental structures suffered most damage, while the traditional buildings of the area with dual structural system and with wooden frames performed relatively well and suffered minor damage. Reinforced concrete buildings were affected not so much by the earthquake itself but was worsened with ground liquefaction. Part of a harbor in Vasiliki was said to have sunk and Schools in both Lefkada and Cephalonia were forced to shut down.

=== Egremni Beach ===
A flank of the well-known pristine Egremni Beach collapsed following the massive tremor. Fortunately, the event happened on the winter months thus meaning no people were harmed. Before the earthquake occurred a cliff in the beach has been known to have been in a state of decline due to the climatic forcing resulting from previous minor seismicity and erosion.

== Casualties ==
A 69-year-old woman died when a boulder from a loose mountain had hit her house. And an 82-year-old woman also died when a wall collapsed onto her. An estimated 4-8 people were hospitalized with further injuries.

== See also ==
- List of earthquakes in 2015
- List of earthquakes in Greece
