= 2015 Pishan earthquake =

Earthquake in western China

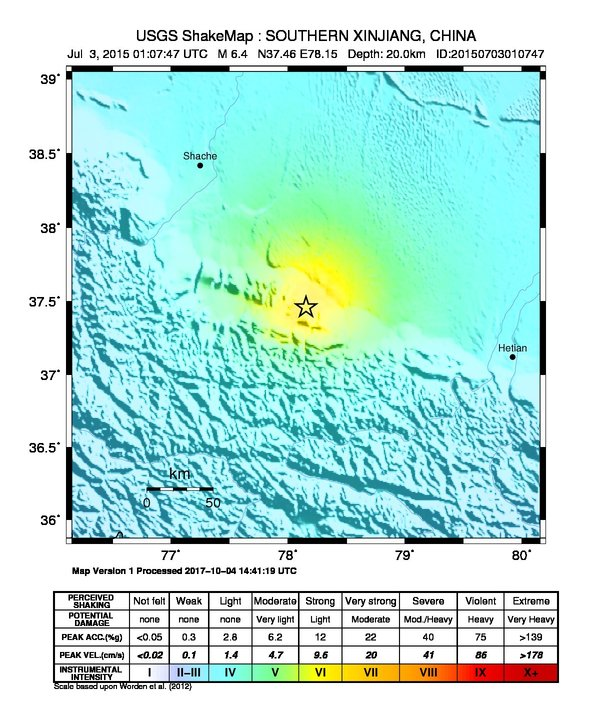

- Location within Southern Xinjiang
- UTC time: 2015-07-03 01:07:47
- ISC event: 611459998
- USGS-ANSS: ComCat
- Local date: July 3, 2015
- Local time: 09:07
- Magnitude: 6.4 M_{w}
- Depth: 20.0 km (12.4 mi)
- Epicenter: 37.459°N 78.154°E
- Areas affected: China
- Max. intensity: MMI VII (Very strong)
- Casualties: 3 dead 71 injured

A magnitude 6.4 earthquake struck in Pishan County, Hotan Prefecture, Xinjiang, China 95 km (59 mi) southeast of Yilkiqi (يىلقىچى يېزىسى / 依力克其乡), on July 3 at a depth of 20.0 km (12.4 mi). The earthquake killed at least 3 people and wounded 71.

== Earthquake ==
The earthquake occurred on a blind thrust fault that ruptured but did not reach the surface. Instead, the earthquake rupture ceased some 3–7 km beneath the surface.

== See also ==
- List of earthquakes in 2015
- List of earthquakes in China
