= 2015 Islamabad earthquake =

Natural disaster in Pakistan

2015 Pakistan earthquake
- Location within Pakistan
- UTC time: 2015-07-24 20:59:54
- ISC event: 607506862
- USGS-ANSS: ComCat
- Local date: July 25, 2015
- Local time: 01:59 PST (UTC+5)
- Magnitude: 5.1 M_{b}
- Depth: 19.2 km (11.9 mi)
- Epicenter: 33.884°N 73.225°E
- Areas affected: Pakistan
- Max. intensity: MMI V (Moderate)
- Casualties: 3 dead

2015 Islamabad earthquake occurred at 01:59:54 Pakistan Standard Time on July 24 in Pakistan. It was centered just 15 km (9.3 mi) northeast of capital city Islamabad at a depth of 19.2 km (11.9 mi). It registered a moment magnitude of 5.1. Collapsed homes left at least three people dead in Abbottabad.

== See also ==
- List of earthquakes in Pakistan
- List of earthquakes in 2015
