= 2015 Ogasawara earthquake =

Japanese seismic event

- 小笠原諸島西方沖地震
- Location within Japan
- UTC time: 2015-05-30 11:23:02
- ISC event: 607273371
- USGS-ANSS: ComCat
- Local date: 30 May 2015
- Local time: 20:23:02 JST (UTC+9)
- Magnitude: M_{w} 7.9; M_{JMA} 8.1
- Depth: 664.0 km (412.6 mi)
- Epicenter: 27.839°N 140.493°E
- Areas affected: Japan
- Max. intensity: MMI VI (Strong); JMA 5+
- Casualties: 13 injured

The 2015 Ogasawara earthquake was a 7.9 magnitude earthquake which struck offshore Japan 189 km (117 mi) west northwest of Chichi-jima in the Ogasawara Islands on May 30 at a depth of 664.0 km (412.6 mi). The shaking of the earthquake was observed almost all over Japan, as it was one of the largest deep-focus earthquakes recorded worldwide.

== Damage and casualties ==
The Associated Press agency reported "twelve people suffered minor injuries", and TEPCO stated that 400 customers lost electricity in Saitama Prefecture. There were no deaths, but elevators stopped working in Tokyo and elsewhere.

== See also ==
- List of earthquakes in 2015
- List of earthquakes in Japan
