= Ponti, Greece =

Ponti Πόντι Αγίου Πέτρου
- Settlement
- Location within Greece
- Coordinates: 38°37′N 20°35′E
- Country: Greece
- Administrative region: Ionian Islands
- Regional unit: Lefkada
- Municipality: Lefkada
- Municipal unit: Apollonioi
- Time zone: UTC+2 (EET)
  - Summer (DST): UTC+3 (EEST)
- Postal code: 31082

Ponti (Greek: Πόντι Αγίου Πέτρου, romanized: Pónti Agíou Pétrou, lit. 'Ponti of Saint Peter') is a village on the island of Lefkada, in Greece. On November 17, 2015, a woman was killed after a 6.5 magnitude earthquake struck the region.
