= 2015 South Kivu earthquake =

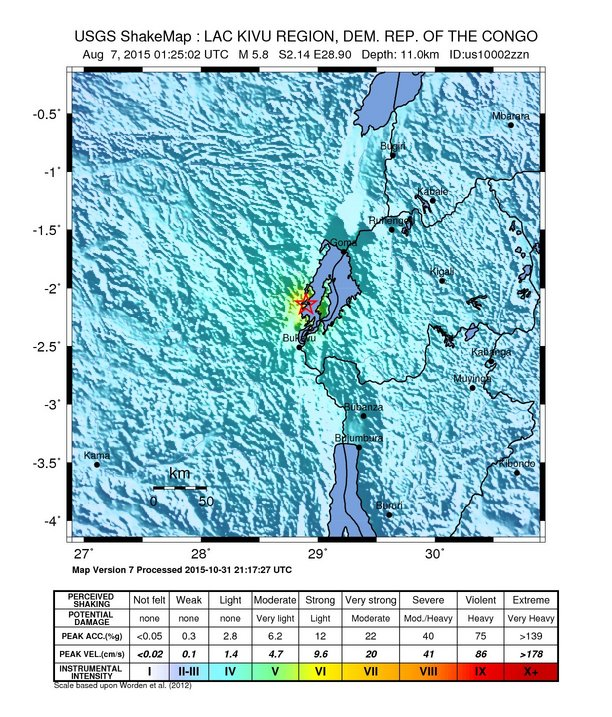
- Intensity map of the August 7, 2015, earthquake in the South Kivu region of the Democratic Republic of the Congo. The star marks the quake's epicenter.
- UTC time: 2015-08-07 01:25:02
- ISC event: 611460107
- USGS-ANSS: ComCat
- Local date: August 7, 2015
- Local time: 03:25
- Magnitude: 5.8 M_{w}
- Depth: 11 km (7 mi)
- Epicenter: 2.141°S 28.897°E
- Areas affected: Democratic Republic of the Congo; Rwanda; Burundi
- Max. intensity: MMI VII (Very strong)
- Casualties: 3 dead, 30 injured

A magnitude-5.8 earthquake struck the Democratic Republic of the Congo 35 km (22 mi) north-northeast of Kabare, South Kivu, on August 7, 2015, at a depth of 11.0 km (6.8 mi).

== Impact ==
One policeman was killed by a falling wall in Bukavu, and two children were killed by a house fire caused by the quake. Several houses collapsed, and people were also injured in neighboring Rwanda.

== See also ==
- List of earthquakes in 2015
- List of earthquakes in the Democratic Republic of Congo
