= List of earthquakes in Tanzania =

This is a list of earthquakes in Tanzania:

== Earthquakes ==
Date	Region	Coords	Mag.	MMI	Deaths	Injuries	Comments
2021-08-31	Shinyanga	3.359°S 32.312°E	4.8 M_{w}	V		1	Moderate damage
2019-03-21	Rukwa	7.914°S 32.109°E	5.5 M_{w}	VI	1		Moderate damage
2017-05-25	Mwanza	3.043°S 32.888°E	4.4 M_{w}	V	1	18	Injuries due to stampede
2016-09-10	Kagera	1.0°S 31.6°E	5.9 M_{s}	VII	23	260	
2007-07-17	Arusha	2.734°S 36.362°E	5.9 M_{w}	VIII			Some damage/Part of an earthquake swarm
2002-05-18		2.9°S 33.7°E	5.5 M_{w}		2		
2000-10-02		7.9°S 30.7°E	6.5 M_{s}			6	
1964-05-07		4.0°S 34.9°E	6.0 M_{w}		1	1	
Note: The inclusion criteria for adding events are based on WikiProject Earthquakes' notability guideline that was developed for stand alone articles. The principles described also apply to lists. In summary, only damaging, injurious, or deadly events should be recorded.
