= 2002 Kalehe earthquake =

- Location within Democratic Republic of the Congo
- UTC time: 2002-10-24 06:08:37
- ISC event: 3509114
- USGS-ANSS: ComCat
- Local date: October 24, 2002
- Local time: 08:08:37
- Magnitude: M_{w} 6.2
- Depth: 10.0 km (6 mi)
- Epicenter: 1.905°S 29.013°E
- Areas affected: Democratic Republic of the Congo
- Max. intensity: MMI IX (Violent)
- Casualties: 2 dead

The 2002 Kalehe earthquake occurred on October 24 at 06:08 UTC. This earthquake had a magnitude M_{w} 6.2, and the epicenter was located in Democratic Republic of the Congo, near Lake Kivu. Two people were reported dead. Building damage was reported in Goma, Lwiro, Kalehe, and Mugeri. The seismicity, volcanism, and uplift in the basin of Lake Kivu delimits the rift of a tectonic plate. Lake Kivu belongs to the western branch of the East African Rift System (EARS). The western branch is usually divided into several segments, and Lake Kivu belongs to the northern segment.

== Tectonic setting ==
Lake Kivu is formed in an active rift basin that is part of the western branch of the East African Rift System. The basin is a half-graben, with the main controlling fault on the western side. The other margin is mainly unfaulted and flexural in type. The active extension is WNW–ESE trending, perpendicular to the main border fault. The displacement rate across this part of the EARS rift system is in the range 3–5 mm per year. Most earthquakes in the rift system are normal in type.

== Earthquake ==
The earthquake had a focal mechanism consistent with normal faulting and a hypocentral depth of 11.0 km. These observations have been combined with the analysis of InSAR data and the known geology of the area to conclude that the earthquake was a result of movement on one of the east-dipping rift border faults.

The earthquake was preceded by an eruption in the Nyiragongo volcanic area to the north of Lake Kivu, in January 2002. This is interpreted to be a diking event. Analysis of the effect of the diking on the stress field to the south suggests that faulting like that seen in the earthquake may have been promoted by this event.

== See also ==
- List of earthquakes in 2002
- List of earthquakes in the Democratic Republic of the Congo
