= October 2015 Hindu Kush earthquake =

Earthquake in Pakistan, Afghanistan and India

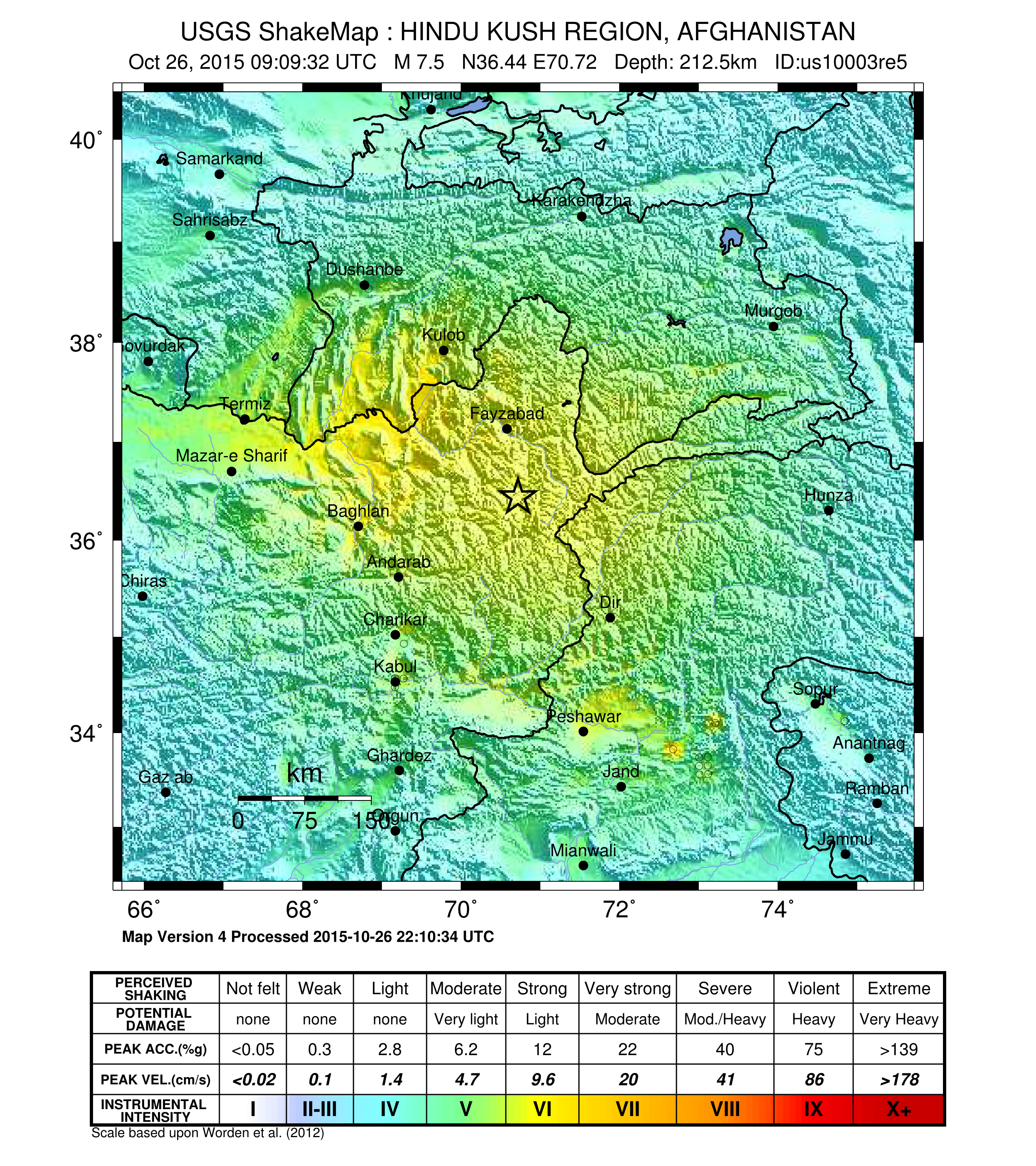
- USGS ShakeMap of the earthquake

- Location within South Asia
- UTC time: 2015-10-26 09:09:42
- ISC event: 612180979
- USGS-ANSS: ComCat
- Local date: 26 October 2015
- Local time: 13:39 AFT, 14:09 PKT, 14:39 IST
- Magnitude: 7.5 M_{w}
- Depth: 231.0 km (143.5 mi)
- Epicenter: 36.524°N 70.368°E
- Type: Reverse
- Areas affected: Afghanistan; Pakistan; India
- Max. intensity: MMI VII (Very strong)
- Casualties: 399 deaths and 2,536 injured

The October 2015 Hindu Kush earthquake was a magnitude 7.5 earthquake that struck South Asia on 26 October 2015, at 13:39 AFT (14:09 PKT; 14:39 IST; 09:09 UTC) with the epicenter 45 km north of Kuran wa Munjan, Afghanistan, at a depth of 231.0 km.

By 5 November, it was estimated that at least 399 people were killed, mostly in Pakistan. Tremors were felt in Pakistan, Uzbekistan, Turkmenistan, Tajikistan and Kyrgyzstan. According to the United States Geological Survey (USGS), Pakistan is located in one of the most earthquake active zones in the world. The earthquake was also felt in New Delhi, in both Pakistan's Azad Kashmir territory, and the Indian state of Jammu and Kashmir and as far as Lucknow and in the prefectures of Kashgar, Aksu, Hotan, and Kizilsu in Xinjiang, China while damage was also reported in Afghan capital Kabul. The earthquake was also felt in the Nepalese capital of Kathmandu.

== Background ==
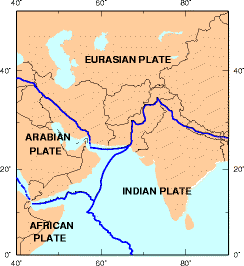
Map depicting regional tectonic plates

The Himalayan mountains, pushed up by the collision of tectonic plates, are prone to devastating quakes. An earthquake in April 2015, Nepal's worst in 80 years, killed over 8,600 people.

The last major earthquake in the same region of similar magnitude (7.6 M_{w}) was almost exactly ten years prior in October 2005, which resulted in 87,351 deaths, 75,266 injured, 2.8 million people being displaced, and 250,000 farm animals dying. The notable difference between this earthquake and the 2005 earthquake is the focal depth and its location with respect to the densely populated areas. The 2005 earthquake was 15 km deep and centered close to some densely populated areas while this earthquake was 212.5 km deep and centered farther from populated areas, reducing its damaging effects.

== Earthquake ==
The main earthquake occurred on 26 October 2015 at 13:39 AFT (14:09 PKT, 14:39 IST, 09:09 UTC) at a depth of approximately 231.0 km, with its epicenter approximately 82 km southeast of Feyzabad, Afghanistan. The USGS initially measured the quake's magnitude at 7.7, then revised it down to 7.6 and later to 7.5. The Pakistan Meteorological Department, however, said the magnitude of the earthquake was 8.1. According to USGS, the epicentre was 67 km from Chitral.

== Damage and casualties ==
=== Afghanistan ===
Casualties by Afghan province
Province	Deaths	Injuries
Badakhshan	9	21
Baghlan	0	8
Kabul	0	21
Kunar	22	64
Laghman	4	0
Nangarhar	8	82
Nuristan	4	0
Parwan	0	30
Takhar	12	39
Unspecified	56	273

At least 115 people were killed and 538 others were injured in Afghanistan. Among the fatalities were five in Jalalabad, and 12 schoolgirls aged 10 to 15 who died in a crowd crush while trying to exit a school building in Takhar. In total, 7,384 houses were destroyed and 12,794 others were damaged, with Badakhshan being the most affected in terms of property damage and Kunar and Nangarhar in terms of number of casualties. More than 194 villages and 131,345 people were impacted by the disaster in Afghanistan, including 51,000 residents in Badakhshan province alone. In Kabul, minor damage and power outages occurred.

=== Pakistan ===
The earthquake resulted in 280 fatalities, 1,770 injuries, and damage to 109,123 buildings. There were 202 deaths and 1,486 injuries in Khyber Pakhtunkhwa; 30 deaths and 59 injured in the Federally Administered Tribal Areas; nine deaths and 30 injuries in Gilgit-Baltistan; five deaths and 78 injuries in Punjab and two deaths and 12 injuries in Azad Kashmir. The most affected areas from Khyber Pakhtunkhwa include Shangla, Lower Dir, Upper Dir, Swat and Chitral, which were in close proximity of the epicenter. As a result of land sliding, the Karakoram Highway was closed. The observed damage was mostly concentrated in rural and old urban masonry buildings, both being built with no or minimal consideration for earthquake loading and having been constructed employing poor construction practices.

=== India ===
Four people were killed, 20 others were injured, 53 houses, dozens of government buildings and roads including a flyover were damaged in Jammu and Kashmir. A Delhi Metro spokesman told AFP "All of around 190 trains plying on the tracks were stopped at the time of the earthquake." Mobile phone services were choked for several hours because of the high voice traffic.

=== Tajikistan ===
In Tajikistan, 14 children suffered injuries in Yovon District when stairs at a local school collapsed. Injuries due to stampede were also reported in Khorugh State University. Buildings were damaged and at least 60 people were injured in the capital Dushanbe, with seven of them requiring hospitalization. In Ishkoshim, eight buildings collapsed and a school building was partially damaged.

== Rescue and relief ==
Pakistan
Pakistani Prime Minister Nawaz Sharif directed all federal, civil, military and provincial agencies to declare an immediate alert and mobilise all resources to ensure the security of citizens of Pakistan. According to Inter-Services Public Relations, Chief of Army Staff General Raheel Sharif has directed army personnel to reach out where required to help affected people without waiting for orders.

Afghanistan
Chief executive officer of Afghanistan Abdullah Abdullah called an emergency meeting of senior officials to respond to the disaster.

India
The Indian Prime Minister, Narendra Modi, contacted Afghan President Ashraf Ghani and Pakistani Prime Minister Nawaz Sharif and offered help.

United Nations
According to UN Secretary-General Ban Ki-moon, UN agencies are mobilizing to assist Pakistani and Afghan relief operations.

== See also ==
- List of earthquakes in 2015
- List of earthquakes in Afghanistan
- List of earthquakes in Pakistan
- Thrust tectonics
