= 2008 Lake Kivu earthquake =

Earthquake in the Democratic Republic of Congo

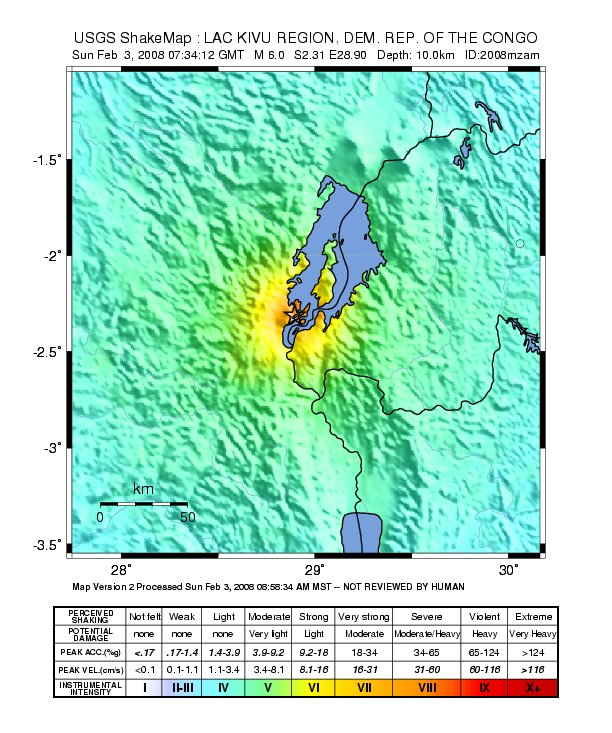
- UTC time: 2008-02-03 07:34:11
- ISC event: 13213409
- USGS-ANSS: ComCat
- Local date: 3 February 2008
- Local time: 09:34:11 CAT
- Magnitude: 5.9 M_{w}
- Depth: 10 km (6 mi)
- Epicenter: 2.314°S 28.896°E
- Type: Normal
- Areas affected: Rwanda; DR Congo
- Total damage: Severe
- Max. intensity: MMI VIII (Severe)
- Casualties: 44 dead, 349+ injured

The 2008 Lake Kivu earthquake shook several countries in Africa's Great Lakes region at 07:34:12 (GMT) on 3 February. It measured 5.9 on the moment magnitude scale. The epicentre was 20 kilometres (12 mi) north of Bukavu at Lake Kivu in the Democratic Republic of Congo.

== Tectonic summary ==
According to the USGS,

The earthquake occurred in the Western Rift of the East African rift system. The East African rift system is a diffuse, approximately 3000-km-long, zone of crustal extension that passes through eastern Africa from Djibouti and Eritrea on the north to Malawi on the south and that constitutes the boundary between the Africa plate on the west and the Somalia plate on the east. At the earthquake's latitude, the Africa and Somalia plates are spreading apart at a rate of about four millimeters per year. The earthquake occurred near Lake Kivu, the basin of which was created by normal faulting similar to that which produced the 3 February earthquake. The largest earthquake to have occurred in the rift system since 1900 had a magnitude of about 7.6. The epicenter of the 3 February 2008, earthquake is within several tens of kilometres (miles) of the epicenter of a magnitude 6.2 earthquake that killed two people in Goma in October 2002. Earthquakes within the East African rift system occur as the result of both normal faulting and strike-slip faulting.

== Details ==
At least 25 people were confirmed dead in Rwanda, with a further 200 seriously injured. Ten people were killed when a church collapsed in the Rusizi District of Western Province in Rwanda, according to Rwanda radio. In the Democratic Republic of Congo at least 5 died and 149 were seriously injured.

== See also ==
- List of earthquakes in 2008
- List of earthquakes in DR. Congo
