= 2005 Lake Tanganyika earthquake =

Magnitude 6.8 seismic event in East Africa

- Location within Tanzania Location within Democratic Republic of the Congo Location within Africa
- UTC time: 2005-12-05 12:19:56
- ISC event: 7781195
- USGS-ANSS: ComCat
- Local date: 5 December 2005
- Local time: 14:19:56 CAT 15:19:56 EAT
- Magnitude: M_{w} 6.8
- Depth: 22 km (14 mi)
- Epicenter: 6.29°S 29.76°E
- Fault: East African Rift
- Type: Dip-slip
- Areas affected: Tanzania, Democratic Republic of the Congo, Burundi
- Max. intensity: MMI X (Extreme)
- Casualties: 8 dead, 5 injured

On 5 December 2005, at 15:19:56 EAT, a M_{w} 6.8 earthquake struck Lake Tanganyika in East Africa. It killed eight people, injured several more, and destroyed hundreds of homes, mostly in the Democratic Republic of the Congo.

== Tectonic setting ==
The East African Rift (EAR) is a 3,000 km (1,900 mi) long Cenozoic age continental rift extending from the Afar triple junction between the horn of Africa and the Middle East, to western Mozambique. Segments of active extension occur from the Indian Ocean west to Botswana and the Democratic Republic of the Congo (DRC). It is the only rift system in the world that is active on a continental scale, providing geologists with a view of how continental rifts develop over time into oceanic spreading centers like the Mid-Atlantic Ridge.

== Earthquake ==
The earthquake had a magnitude of M_{w} 6.8 and a depth of 22 km (14 mi) according to the International Seismological Centre. Its epicenter was located on the Tanzanian shores of Lake Tanganyika, near the border with the Democratic Republic of the Congo. It was caused by dip-slip faulting and the earthquake had a maximum Mercalli intensity of X (Extreme).

The earthquake was felt in Burundi, Tanzania, Rwanda, and as far away as Mombasa, Kenya, and Luanda, Angola; hundreds of people evacuated buildings due to the shaking in Nairobi. By 16 December, 12 aftershocks exceeding M_{w} 4.0 were recorded, the strongest of which measured M_{wc} 5.5 and struck on 9 December.

== Impact ==
In Kigoma Region, a child was killed by a collapsing wall and a 65-year-old woman sustained a femur fracture. Fifty-four houses and a mosque were destroyed, and 705 others as well as numerous structures were damaged in the region. In the Democratic Republic of Congo, six people were killed, three were injured, and 300 houses and a church collapsed in Kalemie. In Makamba, Burundi, one person died and another was injured after a structure collapsed.

== See also ==
- List of earthquakes in 2005
- List of earthquakes in Tanzania
- List of earthquakes in the Democratic Republic of Congo
