= 2022 Fukushima earthquake =

Severe off-shore earthquake near Fukushima, Japan

- 福島県沖地震
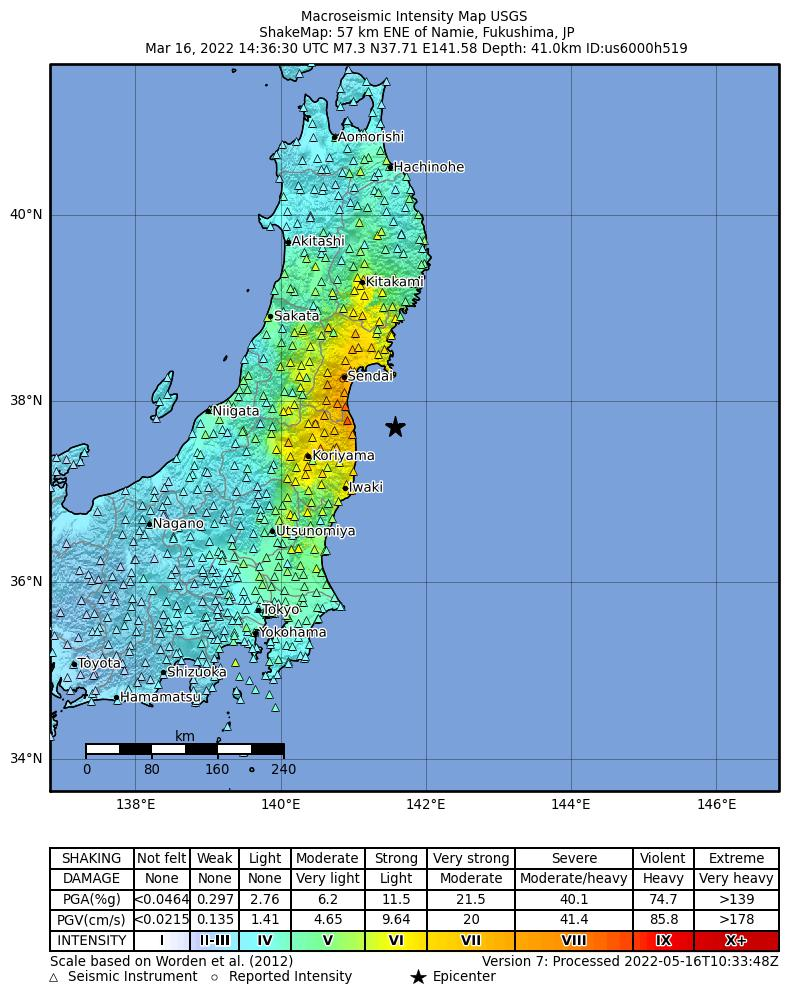

- Location within Japan
- UTC time: 2022-03-16 14:36:33
- ISC event: 622130446
- USGS-ANSS: ComCat
- Local date: 16 March 2022
- Local time: 23:36 JST
- Magnitude: 7.4 M_{JMA} 7.3 M_{w}
- Depth: 57.0 km (35 mi) (JMA) 41.0 km (25 mi) (USGS)
- Epicenter: 37.730°N 141.595°E
- Type: Reverse
- Areas affected: Tōhoku and Kanto region, Japan
- Total damage: ¥1.3 trillion ($8.8 billion USD)
- Max. intensity: JMA 6+–JMA 7 MMI VIII (Severe)
- Peak acceleration: 1.25 g 1,223 gal
- Tsunami: 1 ft (0.30 m)
- Foreshocks: M_{JMA} 6.1; M_{wb} 6.0
- Aftershocks: Multiple, largest is M_{JMA} 5.6 mb 5.5
- Casualties: 4 dead, 247 injured

On March 16, 2022, at 23:36 JST, a strong earthquake struck off the coast of Fukushima, Japan. The earthquake had a magnitude of 7.4 according to the Japanese Meteorological Agency (JMA), while the United States Geological Survey (USGS) gave an estimate of 7.3. Immediately after the event a 30‑cm tsunami was reported. The event is known in Japanese as Fukushima-ken Oki Jishin (福島県沖地震; lit. 'Fukushima prefecture offshore earthquake'). As a result of this natural disaster, four people died and 247 were injured.

== Tectonic setting ==
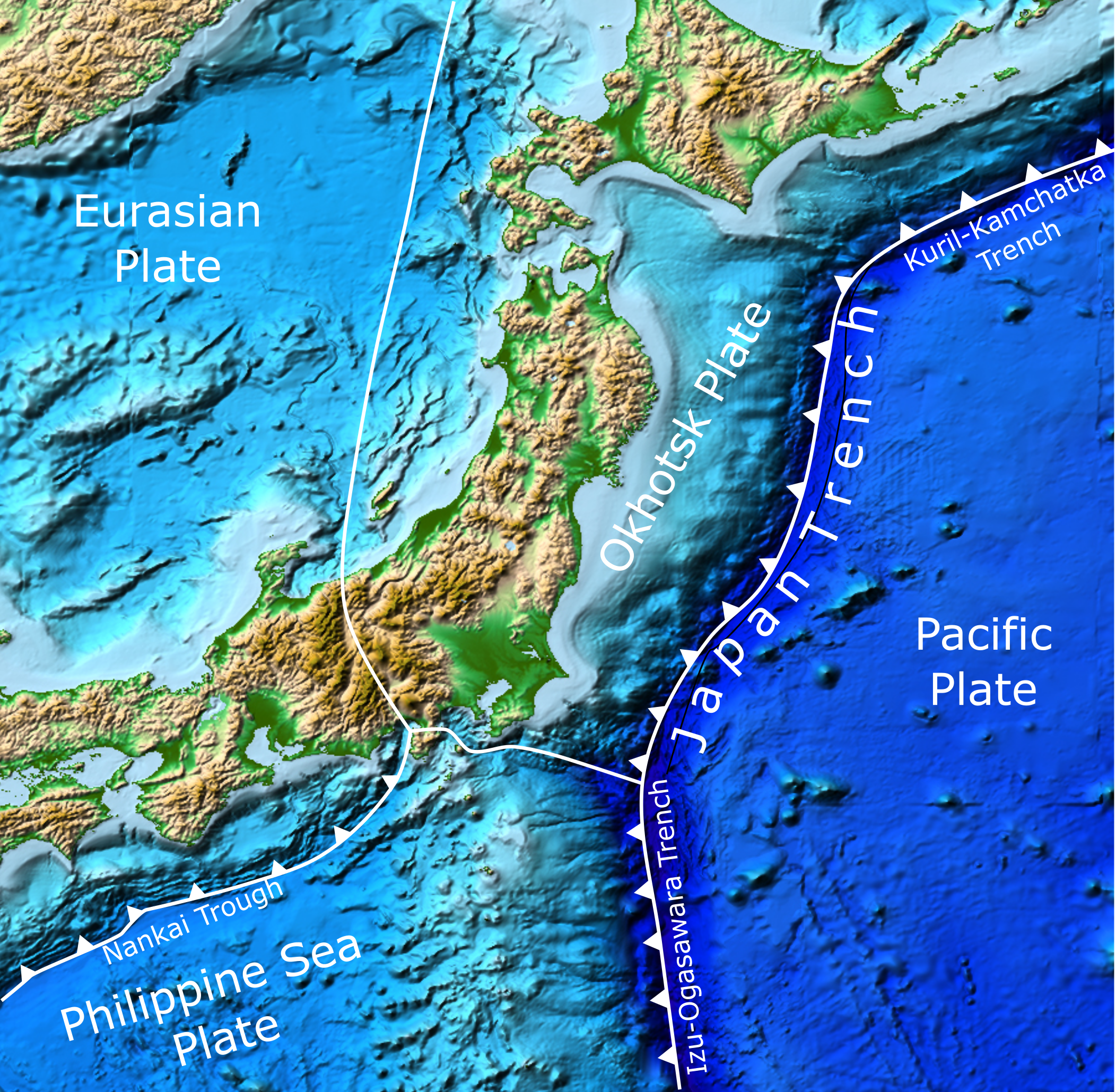
The Japan Trench is the seafloor expression of the East Japan subduction zone.

The Pacific plate, made of oceanic lithosphere, subducts beneath the Okhotsk microplate along a convergent boundary located off the east coast of the northern half of Japan. It runs from the Boso triple junction and ends near Hokkaido, where it joins the Kuril–Kamchatka Trench. At this location, the Pacific plate moves approximately westward relative to the North American plate at a velocity of 70 mm/yr, subducting beneath Japan at the Japan Trench. This subduction zone can produce megathrust earthquakes with magnitudes greater than 8.5, as evident in historical records. It was on the subduction interface where the 2011 Tōhoku earthquake and tsunami nucleated. That event involved a rupture of 220 × 400 km on the subduction zone.

The 2022 earthquake coincidentally occurred near the dates of the first anniversaries of the February 2021 Fukushima and March 2021 Miyagi earthquakes besides being just five days after the eleventh anniversary of the aforementioned megaquake. An analysis of the February 2021 earthquake suggest reverse faulting within the downgoing Pacific plate beneath the subduction interface. Japanese scientists said that the quake ruptured along a 45 km-long, north–south striking fault that dips towards the east.

== Earthquake ==
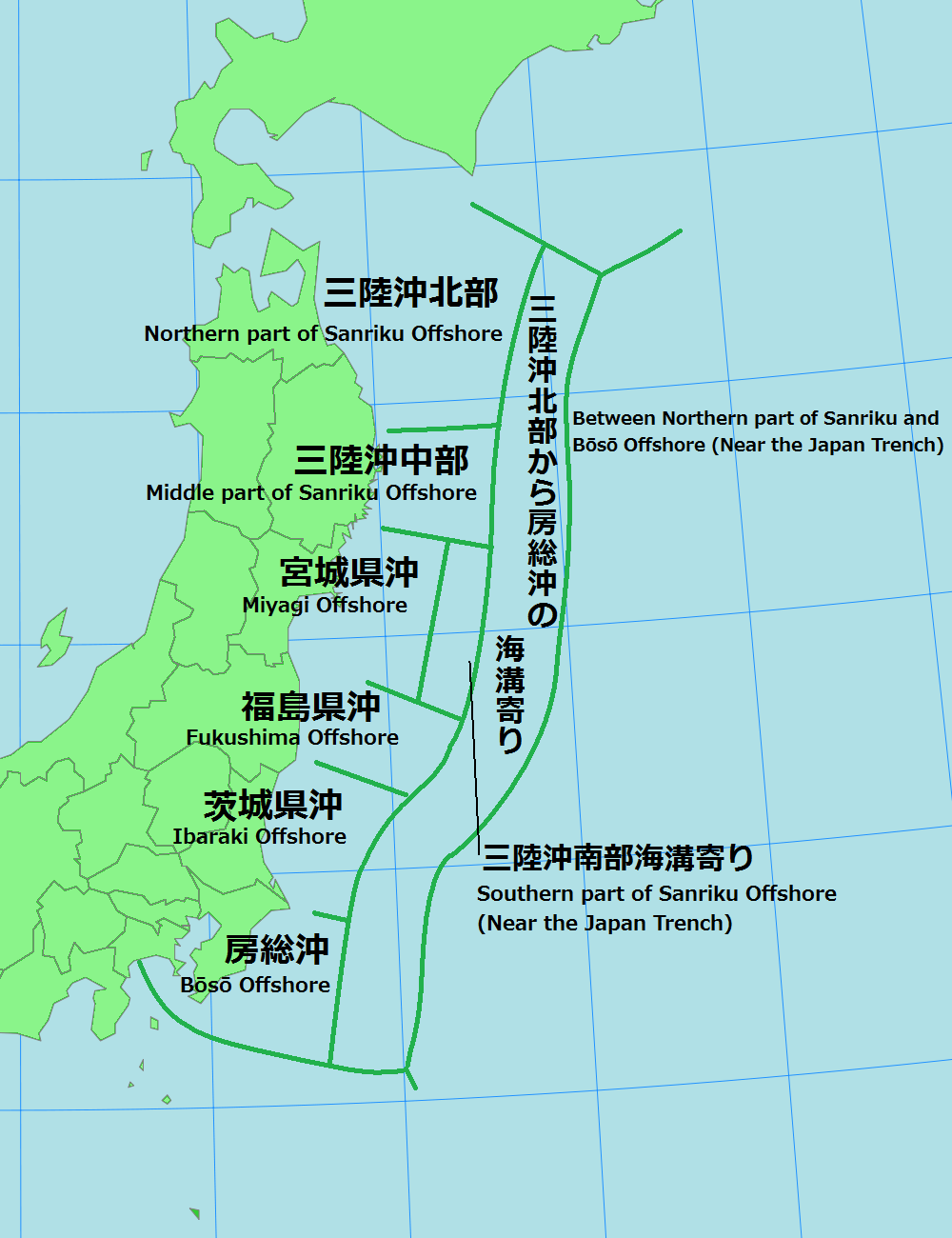
Seismic regions around the East Japan Megathrust designated by the Headquarters for Earthquake Research Promotion

According to the JMA, the earthquake had a magnitude of M_{JMA} 7.4 and struck at a depth of 57 km. The USGS stated that the quake had an M_{w} of 7.3 at a depth of 41.0 km. It was preceded by a M_{wb} 6.0 foreshock at a depth of 48.1 km. The foreshock also measured 6.1 M_{JMA} by the JMA and was recorded with a maximum intensity of Shindo 5-.

This shallow-focus earthquake occurred as a result of reverse faulting at a depth of 57 or 63.1 km within the Pacific plate. The focal mechanism by the USGS suggest it occurred on a plane striking north northeast–south southwest. The USGS added that earthquakes of reverse mechanism with similar magnitudes are usually the result of rupture on a fault plane measuring 55 km × 30 km in size. A finite fault model by the USGS indicate the main rupture patch was an oval-shaped area situated at a depth of 50–70 km (40 × 20 km^{2}). It produced a maximum slip of 1.9 meters.

A source process analysis of body waves indicate:

- The mainshock ruptured an area measuring 50 km (31 mi) along the strike direction and 40 km (25 mi) along the dip direction.
- Most of the slip occurred near the hypocenter, initiation of the rupture. The maximum slip was 0.9 m (2 ft 11 in).
- The rupture occurred over a period of 20 seconds.

Based on seismic inversion using strong motion data, the seismic moment was calculated to be 1.3×10^{20} Nm, corresponding to a moment magnitude of 7.4. The greatest slip occurred north of the hypocenter, measuring 6.2 m (20 ft).

The earthquake may have been an aftershock of the disastrous 2011 earthquake. According to an official from the JMA, the quake had an epicenter very close to that of another earthquake in February 2021, and there may be a link between the two. Although the 2021 event was considered an aftershock, the large time span after 2011 has made determining it difficult. Determining whether the 2022 quake was an aftershock was also challenging as the earthquake had a different mechanism of faulting. The earthquake differs from the 2011 event in that the 2022 quake may have occurred within the subducting Pacific plate while the 2011 event occurred on the boundary between the Pacific and Okhotsk plates.

It is thought that earthquakes of magnitude 7.0–7.5 are expected to occur off the coast every 40 years, even after the 2011 earthquake aftershocks sequence have ended. It was estimated prior to the occurrence of the earthquake, that there was a 60–70% chance that a magnitude 7.0–7.5 earthquake could occur within the Pacific plate as it subducts beneath the Tōhoku region. After the 2011 earthquake, the chances of earthquakes of a similar origin have increased.

According to seismologists, the earthquake formed part of a sequence of three large events, including the April 2011 and February 2021 earthquakes. The epicenter of the 2022 earthquake occurred just 7 km to the southwest of the 2021 shock. While the 2021 shock ruptured in a southernly direction along a 45 km fault, the 2022 shock ruptured northwards along a fault twice as large. The two shocks have been categorized as a doublet earthquake due to their close location, timing of occurrence, and magnitude. A seismic gap exists between the northern extent of the 2022 shock and the southern extent of the 2011 shock. Coulomb stress transfer inferred from calculations showed that the gap off of the Central Miyagi coast has been increasingly stressed and is the likely source for a future rupture.

Positioning stations around northern Honshu found small crustal deformation following the earthquake. Observation points located at Ishinomaki and on the Oshika Peninsula were displaced 3 cm to the north. In the areas of Sendai and northern Fukushima, the crust moved 1 cm east, closer to the epicenter. Meanwhile, in southern the crust moved 1 cm southwest.

An earthquake light manifested in downtown Sendai, coinciding with a magnetic disturbance detected by a geomagnetic observatory in Kakioka, Ibaraki Prefecture. Researchers ruled out "the possibility of the flashes being caused by explosions in transformers or power supply facilities" by checking the maintenance reports of nearby power stations, none of which had malfunctioned within the field of view of two CCTV cameras that had recorded it.

=== Intensity ===
The Japan Meteorological Agency stated that a maximum intensity of 6+ on the JMA seismic intensity scale was recorded in Miyagi and Fukushima prefectures, while the USGS reported a maximum Mercalli intensity of VIII (Severe). It was felt as far as the cities of Nanao and Aomori. The deep focal depth of the event, as well as its magnitude, resulted in strong shaking across the Tōhoku and Kantō regions. The earthquake was felt as far north as Hokkaido to the south in Kyushu with intensities of at least Shindo 1.

According to the National Research Institute for Earth Science and Disaster Prevention, a seismic intensity of close to Shindo 7 was recorded at Soma and Kunimi, Fukushima. Shindo 7 may have been recorded in Kunimi and Koori, both in Fukushima Prefecture. A peak ground acceleration of 1,233 gal was recorded at Kawasaki, Miyagi.

Japan Meteorological Agency seismic intensity Shindo 5− and higher
Intensity	Prefecture	Location
6+	Miyagi	Tome, Zaō
6+	Fukushima	Sōma, Kunimi, Minamisōma
6-	Miyagi	Kurihara, Ōsaki, Wakuya, Natori, Iwanuma, Kakuda, Ishinomaki, Higashimatsushima, Kawasaki, Watari, Ogawara
6-	Fukushima	Nihonmatsu, Tamura, Fukushima, Ten-ei, Naraha, Tomioka, Ōkuma, Futaba, Namie, Shinchi, Date, Koori, Iitate
5+	Miyagi	Shikama, Kami District, Misato, Shiroishi, Murata, Shibata, Marumori, Aoba-ku, Miyagino-ku, Wakabayashi-ku, Taihaku-ku, Shiogama, Tagajo, Tomiya, Matsushima, Shichigahama, Rifu, Taiwa, Osato, Ohira, Onagawa
5+	Fukushima	Kōriyama, Shirakawa, Sukagawa, Motomiya, Kawamata, Ōtama, Kagamiishi, Izumizaki, Nakajima, Yabuki, Tanagura, Tamakawa, Asakawa, Furudono, Kawauchi, Katsurao, Iwaki, Hirono
5+	Iwate	Ichinoseki, Yahaba, Ōshū
5+	Yamagata	Nakayama
5-	Miyagi	Kesennuma, Minamisanriku, Shichikashuku
5-	Fukushima	Yamatsuri, Ishikawa, Hirata, Miharu, Ono
5-	Iwate	Morioka, Hanamaki, Kitakami, Tōno, Kanegasaki, Hiraizumi, Fudai, Noda, Ōfunato, Kamaishi, Sumita
5-	Akita	Yokote, Daisen
5-	Yamagata	Kaminoyama, Tendō, Yamanobe, Kahoku, Sakata, Mogami, Yonezawa, Takahata, Kawanishi, Shirataka
5-	Ibaraki	Mito, Hitachi, Hitachiōta, Kitaibaraki, Kasama, Hitachinaka, Hitachiōmiya, Naka, Omitama, Ibaraki (town), Shirosato, Tōkai, Daigo, Tsuchiura, Chikusei
5-	Tochigi	Nasu, Ichikai, Takanezawa, Nakagawa
5-	Niigata	Minamiuonuma

=== Long period ground motion ===
Class IV was assigned to northern Miyagi on the JMA long period ground motion scale. Long period ground motions are felt on upper floors of tall buildings where the period of seismic waves resonate with a building's natural resonance. The effect is large short frequency movements on the top floors of buildings. Class IV intensity ground motion would make standing impossible. Ground motion of this type would cause unsecured furniture to fall over and crack partition walls.

JMA long period ground motion scale
Class	Prefecture	Location
IV	Miyagi	northern region
III	Miyagi	central and southern regions
III	Fukushima	Hamadōri, Nakadōri, Aizu
III	Yamagata	Murayama Region
II	Aomori	Northern Tsugaru Region
II	Iwate	northern coast, southern coast, northern inland regions
II	Akita	northern inland region
II	Yamagata	Shōnai Region, Mogami Region, Okitama Region
II	Ibaraki	northern and southern region
II	Tochigi	southern region
II	Chiba	northeastern and northwestern region
II	Tokyo	23 wards of Tokyo
II	Kanagawa	Eastern Kanagawa
II	Niigata	Chūetsu, Kaetsu
II	Yamanashi	Fuji Five Lakes, eastern region
II	Nagano	central region
II	Shizuoka	eastern region
I	Hokkaido	Central Tokachi, eastern Oshima, southern Ishikari, eastern Shiribeshi, central Sorachi, central and eastern Iburi, central Nemuro
I	Aomori	southern Tsugaru, Sanpachi Kamikita, Shimokita
I	Iwate	southern coast
I	Akita	northern coast
I	Tochigi	northern region
I	Gunma	northern region
I	Saitama	northern and southern region, Chichibu
I	Chiba	southern region
I	Tokyo	eastern Tama
I	Kanagawa	eastern and western region
I	Niigata	Joetsu
I	Nagano	northern region
I	Shizuoka	central and western region
I	Aichi	western region

== Tsunami ==
Tsunami observations
Location	Arrival time (local)	Recorded height (m)
Iwaki, Fukushima	March 17, 00:36	"small"
Ayukawa, Ishinomaki, Miyagi	March 17, 01:41	0.1
Sendai Port, Miyagi	March 17, 01:46	0.2
Ishinomaki Port, Miyagi	March 17, 02:14	0.3
Soma, Fukushima	March 17, 03:15	0.2

A tsunami measuring 20 cm was recorded by the JMA at Ishinomaki Port, Miyagi at 00:29 local time. It was followed by another wave measuring 30 cm at 02:14. At Sendai Port, the tsunami measured 20 cm and arrived at 03:15. In Ōfunato, a tsunami of 0.4 ft was detected. The earthquake did not generate a large tsunami due to its deep depth, which caused little uplift of the seafloor and only generated small displacements of seawater.

== Impact ==
Across the affected region, 217 buildings were completely destroyed, 4,556 others were severely damaged and 52,162 others suffered minor damage, with the vast majority of them in Miyagi and Fukushima Prefectures, with damage also occurring in five other prefectures.

In Kunimi, a building collapsed, causing its roof to slide off and scatter roof tiles onto an adjacent empty lot. A vehicle was trapped underneath the fallen roof. A shrine in Minamisōma sustained significant damage and partially collapsed. Shelves in offices toppled over. The exterior walls of some homes partially collapsed. Broken windows were also reported. In Yabuki, the exterior walls and doors of a hotel were damaged.

A horse racing facility in Fukushima City suffered water leakage and damage to the walls. The Japan Racing Association stated that horse racing events in Fukushima City had to be cancelled as inspections were ongoing. The facility also suffered damage during the earthquake on February 13, 2021. The Inari Shrine in the city was also affected; three stone lanterns restored following last year's earthquake were destroyed. Shattered glass and broken bricks were reported in the city center. Minor damage including cracked tiles and floods occurred at Fukushima Station.

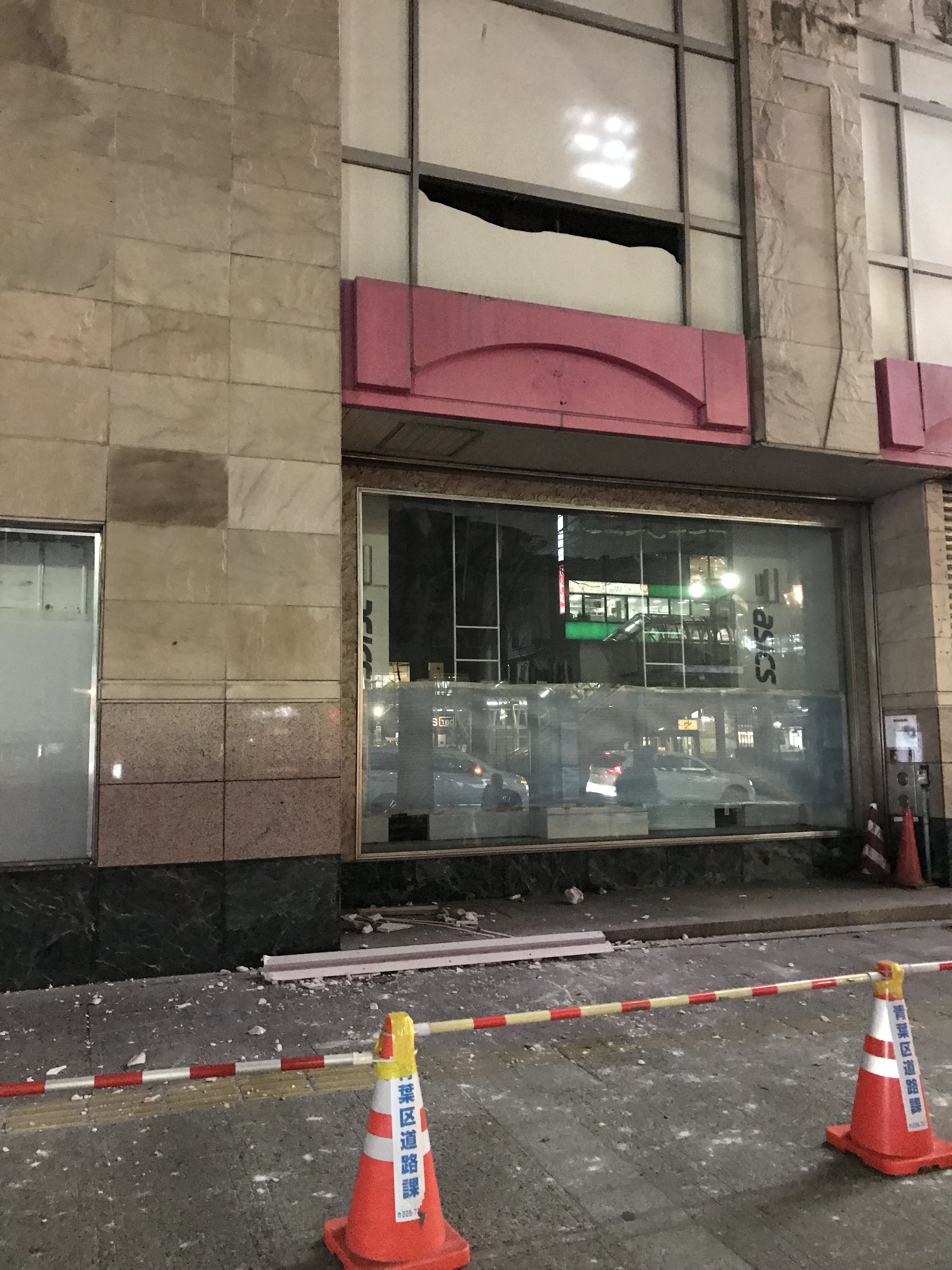
The exterior wall of a building was partially damaged in Aoba-ku, Sendai.

Part of a stone wall of the Aoba Castle in Sendai's Aoba Ward collapsed. The large statue of Date Masamune at the same site was also damaged, with the statue being tilted to one side as a result. The White Cube, a concert hall and sports center in Shiroishi suffered a partial collapse of its ceiling. Shattered glass and ceiling debris was scattered across the seats in the hall. The water supply system in the hall was also damaged.

In Ichikawa, Chiba, a house caught fire immediately after power was restored. It took approximately four hours for the 14 fire trucks involved to extinguish the flames.

In an agricultural area in Yamagata City, Yamagata, a large drainage pipe was damaged and flooded, causing a section of road above it to collapse. A large sinkhole formed in place of the road, flooded with water. Nearby commercial and agricultural facilities had slight damage. At least 47 homes temporarily lost access to water. In Higashine, a shrine collapsed.

The Ministry of Land, Infrastructure, Transport and Tourism reported that there were 25 cases of people trapped in elevators in the Greater Tokyo Area. There were three reports of people trapped in elevators across Fukushima. Another nine instances of people trapped in elevators was reported in Chiba, Kanagawa, Ibaraki and Saitama prefectures.

=== Schools ===
At least 344 schools across eleven prefectures sustained minor damage to walls and ceilings. In the prefectures of Fukushima, Miyagi, Iwate, and Yamagata, 476 schools had closed. Meanwhile, in six prefectures, lesson hours in 15 schools were reduced. Many schools in Fukushima had cracked walls and broken windows. Only a few schools had ruptured water pipes, water interruptions or collapsed ceilings.

=== Commercial business and industrial sector ===
A number of factories suspended operations following the event. A Sapporo Breweries factory in Natori suspended beer production after damage to machines was reported. The warehouse in the factory complex also suffered a collapse, without any casualties. The company stated that shipments would experience delays due to the damage. The Kirin Company factory in Sendai would also suspend beverage production to allow inspections of equipment. In Motomiya, the Asahi Breweries also stopped production at its factory.

Four factories of Murata Manufacturing located in Fukushima and Miyagi were going through repair works on March 17. At the Tome factory, a fire caused some damage. Instances of water bursting from pipes caused significant damage at the company's Sendai, Honmiya and Koriyama factories. Three factories of Sony; two in Miyagi and one in Yamagata were closed for inspections. Only minor damage was found and operations were expected to resume soon. Productions at other factories belonging to companies including Toyota, Nissan, Kioxia, and Renesas Electronics were also impacted. One of two fires reported in Saitama occurred at Iwatsuki Ward involving a scrap facility. The fire was thought to have been caused by a battery igniting. The Onagawa fish market experienced a small switchboard fire in a room, injuring one person. It is believed the switchboard may have came into contact with water leaking from ceiling pipes and started the fire.

Extensive material damage was done to store items and storage warehouses in Miyagi, Fukushima and Niigata. Delivery bases were temporarily evacuated due to the tsunami warnings and some goods were damaged. The closure of major highways delayed the delivery of items. An audio store in Sendai was flooded by the sprinklers activating. Other stores suffered caved-in ceilings and products falling off shelves. Due to safety concerns, stores conducted business at their entrances instead of allowing customers to enter.

=== Power outages ===
Major power outages occurred across the Tōhoku and Kantō regions. An estimated 2.2 million households from 13 prefectures and one metropolitan area were left without power. TEPCO reported 300,000 power outages as a result. An estimated 120,000 instances of power outages occurred in Tokyo, 60,000 in Kanagawa, and 50,000 in Chiba prefectures. Meanwhile, Tohoku Electric Power Co., Inc. (TEP) stated that approximately 153,200 power outages occurred, with 90,000 in Fukushima and 50,000 in Miyagi prefectures.

TEPCO was able to restore power to most households before sunrise on March 17, but at least 33,600 in Miyagi and Fukushima prefectures were still without power. TEP stated that, at 10:55, an estimated 3,100 households in Miyagi and Fukushima were still without power. At least 2,100 of the affected units were in Sōma, while 1,200 households were in Tome. Several power plants working with TEP, including the Haramachi Thermal Power Station and Shin-Sendai Thermal Power Station have ceased operations and are expected to resume operations once safety inspections are complete.

Electrical outages led to the disruption of mobile phone services across Miyagi and Fukushima.

Power outages affected 29 cities in Saitama, including Chichibu and Kumagaya. TEPCO stated that the outages were caused by an activation of a safety mechanism at the Hirono Thermal Power Station during the earthquake, which caused it to cease operations. This also affected other power plants and caused a regional blackout.

=== Transportation ===
A Yamabiko service on the Tōhoku Shinkansen derailed between Fukushima Station and Shiroishi-Zaō Station. Ninety-six passengers were on board at the time of the incident, and all passengers and crewmen were uninjured. An overhead power line pillar on the Tōhoku line near the accident site was tilted and extensive damage was reported on the tracks where the train derailed. Across the Tōhoku line, at least 17 utility poles were severely deformed, with minor damage occurring on other sections of the line.

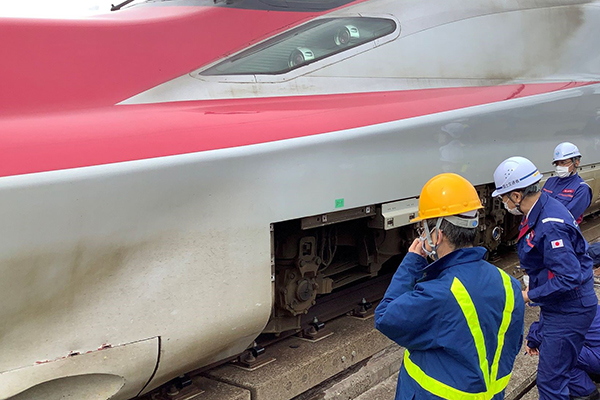
Tetsuo Saito inspecting the Tohoku Shinkansen damaged by the earthquake

JR East stated on the morning of March 17 that train services between Nasushiobara Station and Morioka Station on the Tōhoku and Hokkaido Shinkansen would be suspended until March 21 due to the derailment. Shinkansen operations in Yamagata and Akita were suspended, while trains stopped operating on sections of the Jōban, Tōhoku Main and Ōu Main lines. Due to power outages, the Hokuriku and Jōetsu Shinkansens were also temporarily suspended. Services resumed at 01:30 on March 17.

In response to the suspension of railway services, All Nippon Airways and Japan Airlines flew special routes from Sendai and Fukushima airports to Haneda Airport temporarily.

A 100-meter-long crack and zone of uplift was observed on the Tōhoku Expressway between the Shiroishi interchange and Kunimi toll stop. The crack was reportedly 30–50 cm across and up to 50 cm high in the uplifted areas. Two cars suffered punctured tires when they were driven over the cracks and wedged between. In Miyagino-ku, Sendai, a large fire broke out in a condominium. There were four instances of people trapped inside elevators across the prefecture.

The Tadamigawa Bridge over the Abukuma River in Date was uplifted by several tens of centimeters, making it impassable. At Koori, a bridge that was supposed to open to traffic on March 19 was damaged. Officials from Fukushima Prefecture stated that repair works could take up to three years.

== Casualties ==
A man in his 60s from Sōma, Fukushima, died after jumping out of a window to escape. A second fatality was reported in Tome, Miyagi, a man in his 70s who died from a heart attack. A third fatality was reported in Shichigahama, Miyagi; a man in his 70s who collapsed and was taken to the hospital but died. At Yamagata University, a student was injured when evacuating the building. Six senior residents in Saitama Prefecture sustained minor injuries.

Prime Minister Fumio Kishida stated on the morning of March 17 that four people were killed. Investigations by the National Police Agency concluded that the earthquake only resulted in one confirmed death; the victim from Tome. A fourth fatality in Shiogama, Miyagi, was not caused directly by the earthquake. Two other known deaths were still under investigation as of March 17. A disaster report published in November by the Fire and Disaster Management Agency (FDMA) concluded that the earthquake caused four deaths, after another death in Tokyo was thought to be related to the earthquake.

The FDMA report stated 247 people were injured. At least 108 residents were injured in Miyagi Prefecture and 101 were injured in Fukushima Prefecture—some received injuries that required treatment. Four people in Kurihara, Miyagi had minor injuries due to falling objects. Six people in Saitama, five each in Kanagawa, Iwate and Yamagata, eight and Ibaraki, three in Chiba, two each in Yamanashi and Tochigi, and one each in Akita and Niigata, were injured.

== Response ==
=== Earthquake and tsunami advisory ===
The Earthquake Early Warning system issued a warning at 23:36:55.6 local time; 9.6 seconds after the initial detection of seismic waves from the mainshock. The earthquake was first detected 1.6 seconds after it had occurred, and was given a seismic intensity of Shindo 3. The early warning came 9.6 seconds later when instruments recorded an intensity of Shindo 5-. Another warning was issued for a seismic intensity of Shindo 6+.

A tsunami advisory was issued along the coasts of Miyagi and Fukushima prefectures following the earthquake, causing evacuations. The tsunami advisory was cancelled at 05:00 local time after only small waves were observed. Officials stated that changes in tide levels at the coasts of Fukushima, Miyagi, and Iwate prefectures can be expected without damage.

=== Domestic ===
Chief Cabinet Secretary Hirokazu Matsuno said in a press conference on March 17 that a Disaster Relief Act would be in effect in every municipality of Fukushima and Miyagi. The Japan Self-Defense Forces was deployed to Fukushima and Miyagi prefectures at the request of their respective governors to restore essential lifelines.

Workers at Tokyo Electric Power Company (TEPCO) examined the 2011 disaster-crippled Fukushima Daiichi Nuclear Power Plant for damage. Officials later reported no new anomalies at the power plant. Reports soon came in that a fire alarm system sounded at the turbine hall of Unit 5 of the Fukushima Daiichi Nuclear Power Plant, but no fire had occurred. At 01:00, workers inspected the spent containment structures of Units 1, 2 and 3, as well as the cooling facilities for the spent fuel pools where nuclear fuels are stored. The water level of Unit 2's spent fuel pool fell for a while and returned to normal. At the Fukushima Daini Nuclear Power Plant, the pumps in the spent fuel pools of Units 1 and 3 had stopped working.

The government of Fukushima Prefecture requested the assistance of the central government for water supply .

An evacuation order was issued to 1,961 households located along the coast in Watari, affecting at least 6,820 residents. The city of Ishinomaki opened seven evacuation shelters for affected residents to seek refuge. The cracked section of the Tōhoku Expressway was repaired and reopened to traffic at 15:30, according to police in Miyagi.

Residents have been urged to stay alert about the threat of landslides and avalanches as heavy rain and snowfall are expected to hit the Tōhoku region until March 19. Weathernews stated that due to the earthquake, steep slopes may have been destabilized, and areas with heavy snowfall are at risk of experiencing avalanches. Homes that have been damaged by shaking may be further damaged by weather elements during this period as well.

=== International ===
Immediately after the earthquake, the United States Geological Survey issued a Yellow PAGER (Prompt Assessment of Global Earthquakes for Response) which estimated the economic loss caused. There was a 37% chance that damage from the earthquake would result in losses of US$10–100 million; the likelihood for damages to fall within US$100 million to 1 billion was 30%. It was soon revised to Orange, for a 35% chance of damage in the cost range of US$100 million to 1 billion. There was a 34% chance that the financial loss would cost US$10–100 billion. A Green PAGER was also issued for expected fatalities; the agency estimated that there was a 65% chance that no fatalities would occur. There was a 30% chance that 1–10 deaths could occur in the quake.

A tsunami threat was issued by the Pacific Tsunami Warning Center, but the agency clarified that the event posted no danger to the West Coast of the United States, Alaska and British Columbia.

== See also ==
- List of earthquakes in 2022
- List of earthquakes in Japan
- List of tsunamis
- 2016 Fukushima earthquake
