= List of foreshocks and aftershocks of the 2011 Tōhoku earthquake =

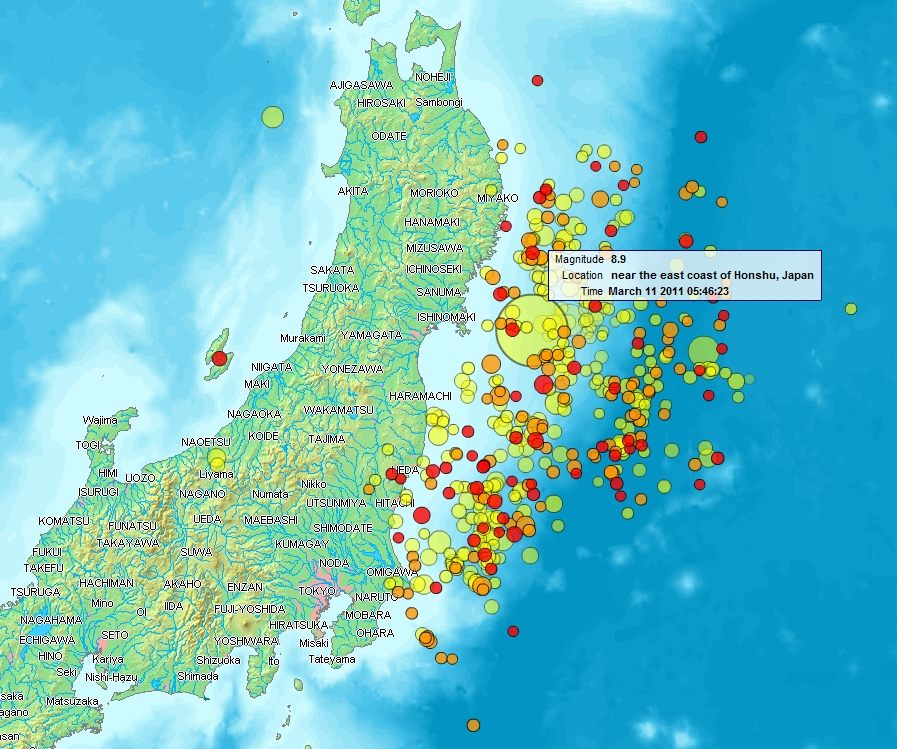
Map of aftershocks until March 14 (first 4 days)

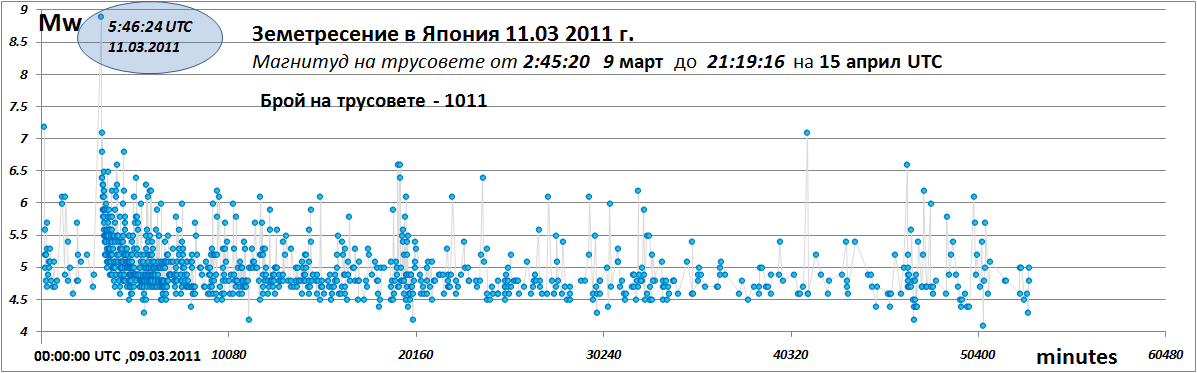
Visualization of intensity of aftershocks in the first few days

This is a list of foreshocks and aftershocks of the 2011 Tōhoku earthquake. Japan had experienced 900 aftershocks after the M9.1 earthquake on March 11, 2011 with about 60 aftershocks being over magnitude 6.0 and three over magnitude 7.0. For conciseness, only earthquakes with magnitudes greater than 7.0 or an intensity greater than lower-6 on the shindo scale are listed here. M_{w} refers to the moment magnitude scale, while Mjma, M_{jma}, or Mj refer to the Japan Meteorological Agency magnitude scale.

== Foreshocks ==
Japan Time	Magnitude	Coordinates	Depth	Intensity (shindo)	Comment
2011-03-09 11:45	M_{w} 7.3, Mj 7.3	38.424°N 142.836°E	32 km (Note: Magnitude 7.2 – NEAR THE EAST COAST OF HONSHU, JAPAN. Earthquake.usgs.gov. Retrieved on 2011-04-12.)	5-	The source was estimated to have a length of 28.7 km and a width of 53.2 km with a slip of 1.25 m. Caused a 55 cm tsunami.
2011-03-10 06:23	M_{w} 6.4, Mj 6.8	38.171°N 143.043°E	9 km	4	Caused an 11 cm tsunami.

== Main shock ==
Japan Time	Magnitude	Coordinates	Depth	Intensity (shindo)	Comment
2011-03-11 14:46	M_{w} 9.1,Mj 8.4	38.322°N 142.369°E	29 km (Note: https://earthquake.usgs.gov/earthquakes/eventpage/official20110311054624120_30/executive. Earthquake.usgs.gov (2011-03-14). Retrieved on 2011-04-12.)	7	Further information: 2011 Tōhoku earthquake and tsunami 19,759 deaths, 2,553 missing, tsunami, nuclear incidents.

== Aftershocks ==
Japan Time	Magnitude	Coordinates	Depth	Intensity (shindo)	Comment
2011-03-11 15:08	Mj 7.4	39.82°N 139.025°E	32 km	5-	
2011-03-11 15:15	M_{w} 7.9, Mj 7.6	36.27°N 141.14°E	43 km (Note: : Preliminary Earthquake Report: NEAR THE EAST COAST OF HONSHU, JAPAN, USGS Earthquake Hazards Program (2011-03-11). Retrieved on 2011-04-12.)	6+	
2011-03-11 15:25	M_{w} 7.7, Mj 7.5	38.05°N 144.59°E	19 km (Note: USGS Earthquake Hazards Program: Preliminary Earthquake Report: OFF THE EAST COAST OF HONSHU, JAPAN. Neic.usgs.gov (2011-03-11). Retrieved on 2011-04-12.)	4	
2011-04-07 23:32	M_{w} 7.1, Mj 7.2	38.253°N 141.640°E	42 km (Note: Magnitude 7.1 – NEAR THE EAST COAST OF HONSHU, JAPAN. Earthquake.usgs.gov. Retrieved on 2011-04-12.)	6+	Further information: April 2011 Miyagi earthquake 4 dead, 100+ injured, large scale power outage in Tōhoku region.
2011-04-11 17:16	M_{w} 6.6, Mj 7.0	37.007°N 140.477°E	10 km (Note: Magnitude 6.6 – EASTERN HONSHU, JAPAN. Earthquake.usgs.gov. Retrieved on 2011-04-12.)	6-	Further information: April 2011 Fukushima earthquake 6 dead, several injured, localized power outage and landslides in Iwaki, Fukushima.
2011-04-12 14:07	Mj 6.4	37.052°N 140.643°E	15 km	6-	
2011-07-10 09:57	M_{w} 7.0, Mj 7.3	38.040°N 143.287°E	23 km	4	10 cm of tsunami in Sōma and Ōfunato.
2012-12-07 17:18	M_{w} 7.3	37.8°N 144.2°E	49 km (JMA); 36 km	5-	Further information: 2012 Kamaishi earthquake Tsunami under 1 meter. Considered an aftershock by the National Earthquake Information Center in Colorado, USA.
2013-10-26 02:10	M_{w} 7.1	37.170°N 144.665°E	10 km	4	Tsunami
2016-11-22 05:59	M_{w} 6.9	37.393°N 141.387°E	9 km	5-	Further information: 2016 Fukushima earthquake
2021-02-13 23:07:49	M_{w}7.1; M_{JMA}7.3	37.686°N 141.992°E	35 km (USGS); 55 km (JMA)	6+	Further information: 2021 Fukushima earthquake This earthquake resulted in at least 1 death and left at least 185 injured. Serious damage was caused. There was no tsunami. It is believed that this was an aftershock of the earthquake almost 10 years to the exact date of the 2011 mainshock.
2021-03-20 18:09:45	M_{w}7.0; M_{JMA}6.9	38.475°N 141.607°E	54 km (USGS); 60 km (JMA)	5+	Further information: March 2021 Miyagi earthquake 11 people injured.

== Possibly related earthquakes ==
The following earthquakes are possibly related to the 2011 Tōhoku earthquake. However, agreement toward the relationships has not been reached among the researchers.

Japan Time	Magnitude	Coordinates	Depth	Intensity (shindo)	Comment
2011-03-12 03:59	M_{w} 6.3, Mj 6.7	37.02°N 138.36°E	8 km 2 km (Note: USGS Earthquake Hazards Program: Preliminary Earthquake Report: NEAR THE WEST COAST OF HONSHU, JAPAN. Neic.usgs.gov. Retrieved on 2011-04-12.)	6+	Further information: 2011 Nagano earthquake Possibly a triggered earthquake.
2011-03-12 04:31	Mj 5.9	36.948°N 138.572°E	1 km	6-	Possibly a triggered earthquake.
2011-03-12 05:42	Mj 5.3	36.972°N 138.59°E	2 km	6-	Possibly a triggered earthquake.
2011-03-15 22:31	M_{w} 6.0, Mj 6.4	35.29°N 138.54°E	9 km (Note: USGS Earthquake Hazards Program: Preliminary Earthquake Report: EASTERN HONSHU, JAPAN. Neic.usgs.gov (2011-03-15). Retrieved on 2011-04-12.)	6+	Further information: 2011 Shizuoka earthquake 50 injured. Power outage. Near presumed location of magma chamber of Mount Fuji. Sinistral strike-slip fault. Possibly a triggered earthquake.
2021-05-01 10:27:27	M_{w}6.8	38.230°N 141.665°E	47 km	5+	Three people were injured by the strong shaking.
2022-03-16 23:36:33	M_{w}7.3; M_{JMA}7.4	37.702°N 141.587°E	63.1 km (USGS); 57 km (JMA)	6+	Further information: 2022 Fukushima earthquake A tsunami advisory was issued by the Japan Meteorological Agency for this earthquake. There was 4 dead and 225 injured. An estimated 2.2 million households from 13 prefectures and one metropolitan area were left without power.
