= 2021 Miyagi earthquake =

2021 Miyagi earthquake

- 2021 Fukushima earthquake
- March 2021 Miyagi earthquake
