= Cresta =

Cresta may refer to:

- Cresta, Gauteng, a suburb in South Africa
- CRESTA, Catastrophe Risk Evaluating and Standardizing Target Accumulations
- Cresta Awards, international advertising awards
- Cresta (soft drink)
- Vauxhall Cresta, an automobile model
- Toyota Cresta, an automobile model

== See also ==
- Cresta Blanca Winery, a winery in Livermore Valley
- Cresta Run, a sled run or track in St. Moritz, Switzerland
- Crest (disambiguation)
- Cresto (disambiguation)
