= Cresto =

Cresto may refer to:

- Monte Cresto, a peak of the province of Biella, in Piedmont, Italy

== People ==
- Gilles Cresto, a Monegasque archer
- Mayda Cresto, an Argentine lawyer, notary and politician
- Sergio Cresto, an American Italian rally driver

== See also ==
- Cresta (disambiguation)
