= 2021 Fukushima earthquake =

February 2021 earthquake off the Tōhoku coast in Japan

- 福島県沖地震
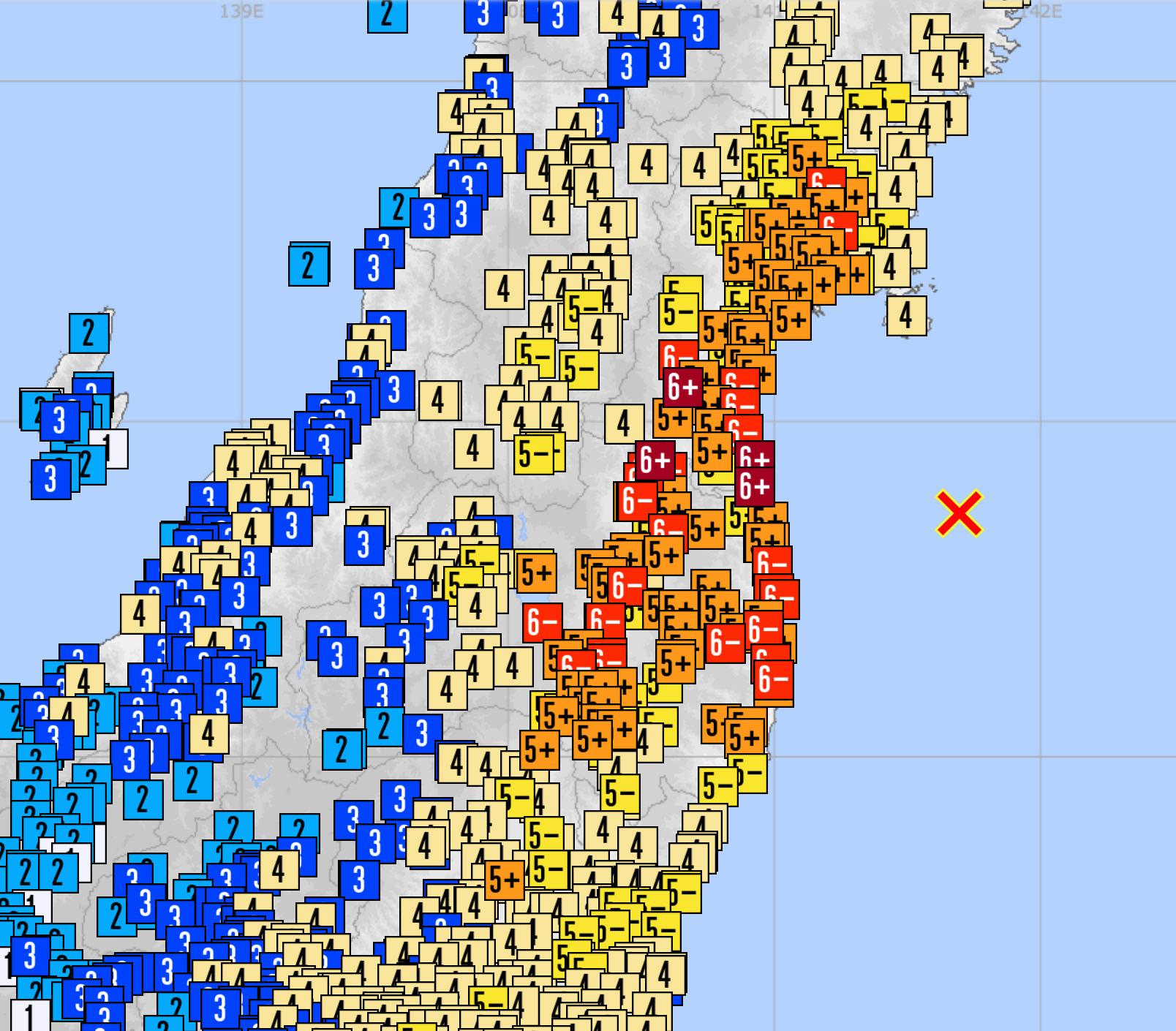
- JMA seismic intensity map

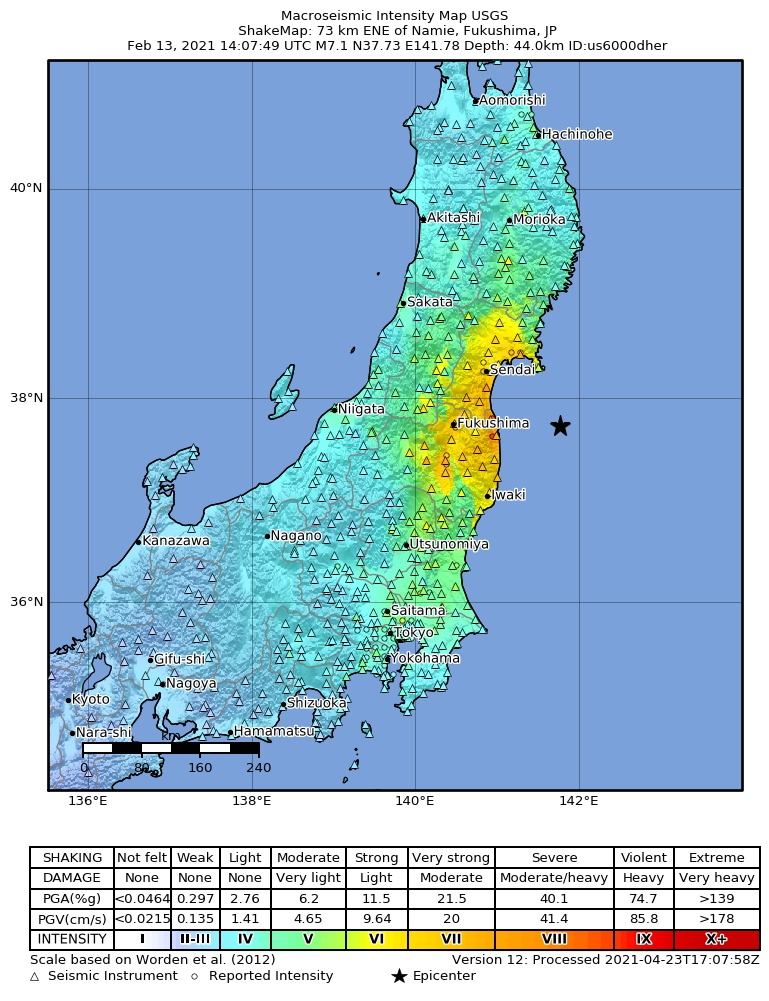

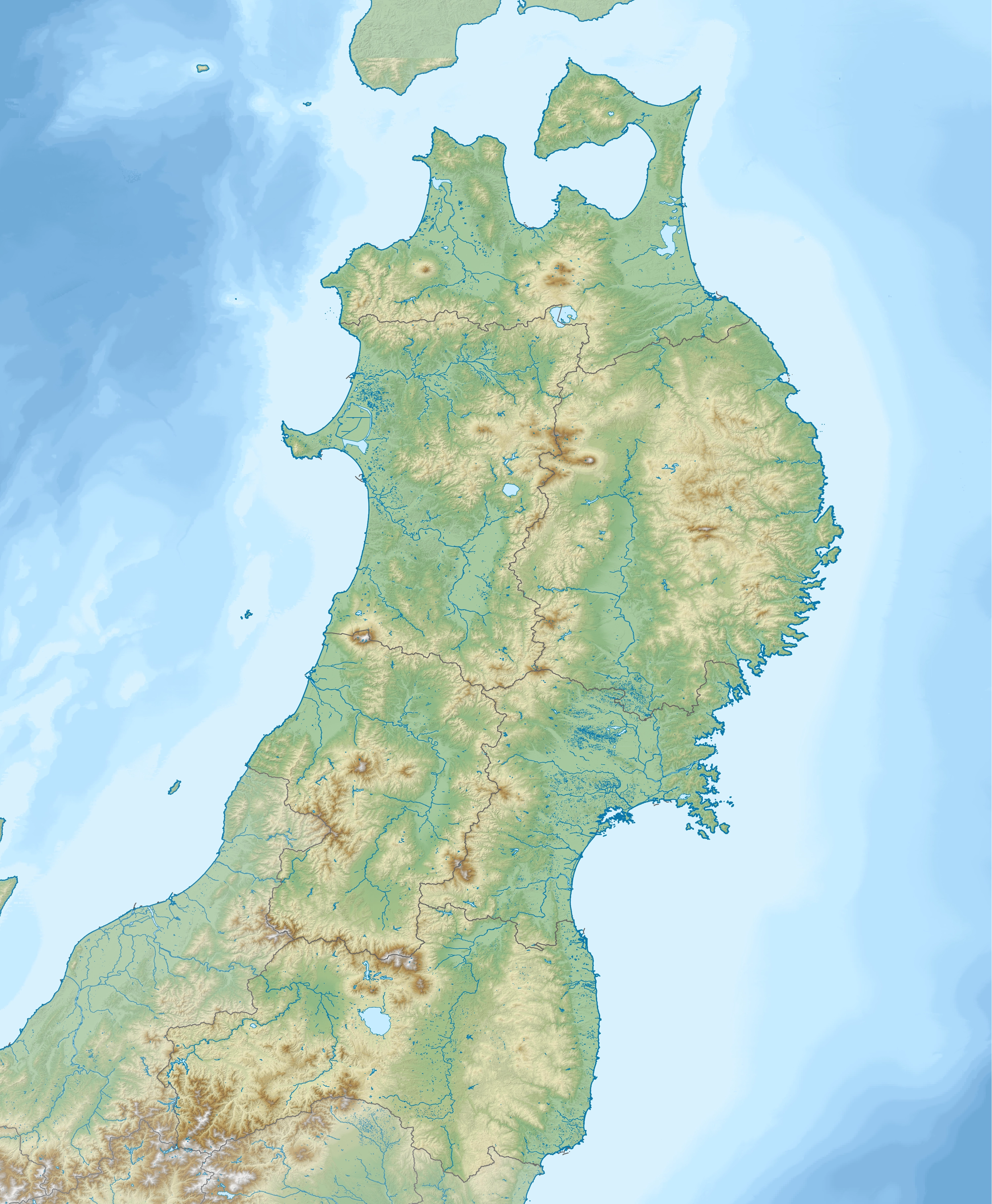
- Location within Tohoku, Japan
- UTC time: 2021-02-13 14:07:49
- ISC event: 619834062
- USGS-ANSS: ComCat
- Local date: 13 February 2021
- Local time: 23:07 JST
- Magnitude: 7.3 M_{JMA} 7.1 M_{w}
- Depth: 55.0 km (34 mi) (JMA) 44.0 km (27 mi) (USGS)
- Epicenter: 37.720°N 141.762°E
- Fault: Japan Trench
- Type: Reverse
- Total damage: ¥138 billion (US$1.2 billion)
- Max. intensity: JMA 6+–7 (MMI VIII)
- Peak acceleration: 1.46 g 1432 gal
- Tsunami: 20 cm (0.66 ft)
- Landslides: Yes
- Aftershocks: Multiple. The largest is an M_{w} 6.0.
- Casualties: 3 dead, 186 injured, 16 serious

An intense and deadly seismic event struck offshore east of Tōhoku, Japan on 13 February 2021. The M_{JMA} 7.3 or M_{w} 7.1 earthquake occurred on a Saturday night at 23:07 JST (14:07 UTC) at a focal depth of 44.0 kilometers (27.3 mi). It had a maximum JMA intensity of Shindo 6+ to Shindo 7 while on the Mercalli intensity scale, it registered a rating of VIII (Severe). The earthquake was followed by multiple aftershocks within less than an hour, three of which registering magnitude 5.3. The earthquake itself has been considered an aftershock of the 2011 Tōhoku earthquake which had occurred almost ten years prior.

The earthquake left three people dead, and at least 186 injured. It also inflicted significant structural damage across the Tōhoku and Kanto regions. This earthquake resulted in both insurance claims and losses exceeding ¥138 billion (US$1.2 billion). Small tsunami waves were also observed without any damage. Because of its proximity to the Fukushima Daiichi Nuclear Power Plant, the event provoked concerns of radiation leaks but was dismissed soon after. Although there were no changes to the level of radiation, cooling water used in two of the reactor units was discovered leaking.

== Background ==
The 11 March 2011 Tōhoku earthquake struck off the coast of eastern Japan, with an epicenter north of Sendai, and a hypocenter depth of 29 km. It was the largest instrumentally recorded earthquake in the country, and the fourth largest ever recorded worldwide. This earthquake generated massive tsunamis measuring up to 41 meters in height, the highest in Japan. It swept through the Kantō Plain, destroying towns and cities. The tsunami also caused a series of catastrophic nuclear meltdowns at the Fukushima Daiichi Nuclear Power Plant shortly after. In all, an estimated 20,000 people lost their lives due to both the earthquake and tsunami. The disaster resulted in economic losses of US$360 billion, making it the costliest natural disaster in history.

== Tectonic setting ==
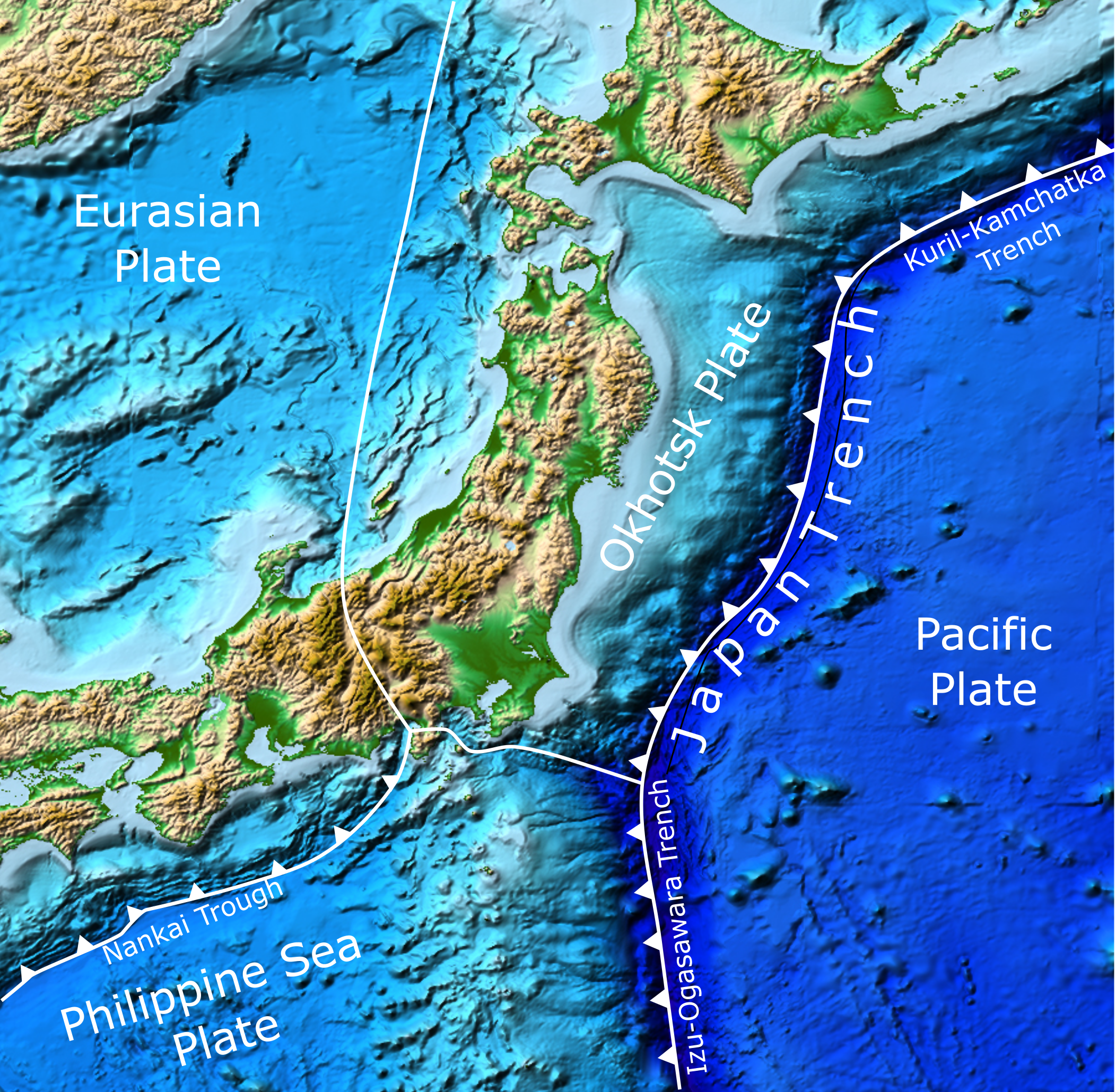
The Japan Trench is the seafloor expression of the East Japan subduction zone.

The Pacific plate, made of oceanic lithosphere, subducts beneath the Okhotsk Sea plate along a convergent boundary located off the east coast of the northern half of Japan. It runs from the Boso triple junction and ends near Hokkaido, where it joins the Kuril–Kamchatka Trench. At this location, the Pacific plate moves approximately westward relative to the North American plate at a velocity of 70 mm (2.8 in)/yr, subducting beneath Japan at the Japan Trench. This subduction zone is capable of producing megathrust earthquakes with magnitudes greater than 8.5, evident in the historical records. It was on the subduction interface where the 2011 earthquake nucleated. That event involved a rupture 220 km (140 mi) by 400 km (250 mi) on the subduction zone.

The most recent similar-sized comparable to the 2021 quake was the 6.9 M_{w} 2016 Fukushima earthquake, which occurred just southwest of where the February 2021 earthquake struck. That earthquake was the result of normal faulting within the overriding Okhotsk Sea Plate at a depth of 9 km (5.6 mi). The Japan Meteorological Agency (JMA) observed a maximum intensity of Shindo 5 Lower, or VII (Very strong) according to the US Geological Survey. A moderate tsunami of 1.4 m (4 ft 7 in) struck the Sendai area shortly after, the largest since the 2011 disaster. Minimal damage and few casualties were reported.

== Earthquake ==
The earthquake occurred as the result of reverse faulting within the subducting Pacific plate; not on the subduction interface itself. Hence, it could be considered an intraplate earthquake. Moment tensor solutions indicate slip occurred either on a moderately dipping fault striking to the south, or a moderately dipping fault striking to the north-northeast, consistent with the east–west oriented compression expected in this region. Meanwhile, the Earthquake Research Committee from the Japanese government said the earthquake ruptured along a 45 km-long, north–south striking fault that dips towards the east. According to the US Geological Survey, the earthquake struck at a depth of 44.0 km (27.3 mi), while the JMA placed its depth at 55 km (34 mi).

According to the National Research Institute for Earth Science and Disaster Resilience (NIED), a preliminary source inversion using peak ground acceleration data indicate a reverse fault measuring 32 km × 24 km ruptured during the quake. The rupture caused a maximum coseismic slip of 2.7 meters southwest of the hypocenter. Much of the coseismic slip which was detected southwest of the epicenter occurred five to ten seconds into the mainshock. The total seismic moment released is estimated at 4.7 × 10^{19} Nm.

A back-projection analysis of the event revealed that the earthquake occurred in a coseismic gap of the 2011 mainshock rupture. Stress transfer from the 2011 event would have increased compressional strain around the subduction interface (which ruptured in 2011). The subducting Pacific plate beneath the rupture experienced an increase in compressional strain, causing the earthquake. The 2021 event may have released strain within the Pacific plate as a response to the increased stress brought by the 2011 shock. It is thought to be the largest thrust faulting event located well within the 2011 rupture area.

According to seismologists, this earthquake formed part of a sequence of three large events including the March 2022 and April 2011 events. The epicenter of the 2021 earthquake occurred close to that of the larger 2022 shock and has been categorized as a doublet earthquake due to their close location, the timing of occurrence, and magnitude. A seismic gap exists between the northern extent of the 2022 shock and the southern extent of the 2011 shock, located off the coast of Central Miyagi Prefecture, including Sendai. Coulomb stress transfer inferred from calculations showed that the gap has been stressed and is the likely source for a future rupture.

=== Seismic intensity ===
According to the JMA, the earthquake had a maximum intensity of Shindo 6 Upper. These intensities were recorded in Fukushima and Miyagi prefectures. However, the Earth Science and Disaster Prevention Research Institute suggested the earthquake may have also caused Shindo 7 shaking at Yamamoto, Miyagi. At the same location, the maximum peak acceleration caused by the earthquake was recorded at 1,432 gals, far exceeding the 980 gals and 1,362 gals recorded in Mashiki, Kumamoto during the 2016 Kumamoto earthquakes which were assigned Shindo 7. This event which occurred near the deeper portion of the subduction interface generated short-period seismic energy which caused severe shaking at the coast.

Japan Meteorological Agency seismic intensity Shindo 5 Lower and higher
Intensity	Prefecture	Location
6+	Miyagi	Zaō
6+	Fukushima	Sōma, Kunimi, Shinchi
6-	Miyagi	Ishinomaki, Kawasaki, Iwanuma, Tome, Watari, Yamamoto
6-	Fukushima	Fukushima, Koriyama, Sukagawa, Minamisōma, Motomiya, Koori, Kawamata, Ten-ei, Naraha, Okuma
5+	Miyagi	Sendai, Ishinomaki, Shiogama, Shiroishi, Kurihara, Osaki, Ogawara, Marumori, Matsushima, Shichigahama, Rifu
5+	Fukushima	Fukushima, Tomioka, Inawashiro, Kagamiishi, Motomiya, Minamisōma
5+	Tochigi	Takanezawa, Nasu
5-	Miyagi	Ishinomaki, Tagajo, Kurihara, Osaki, Tomiya, Marumori, Taiwa, Shikama, Misato, Kami
5-	Fukushima	Iwaki, Shirakawa, Yugawa, Aizumisato, Nishigo, Tanagura, Yamatsuri, Hirata, Furudono, Miharu
5-	Tochigi	Ōtawara, Nakagawa
5-	Iwate	Ichinoseki, Yahaba
5-	Yamagata	Yonezawa, Kaminoyama, Nakayama, Shirataka
5-	Ibaraki	Kasama, Hitachi, Tsuchiura, Chikusei, Shirosato, Tokai
5-	Saitama	Kazo

=== Long period ground motion ===
In addition to violent ground motions, extreme long period ground motion was also recorded. The intensity of the Japan Meteorological Agency long period ground motion scale reached a maximum of Class IV in Fukushima's Nakadori Region—the first time that level of intensity was observed after the 2018 Hokkaido Eastern Iburi earthquake. Class IV intensity has been observed only four times since the scale was first used in 2013 and the first time it was measured since full time operation of the scale began in 2019.

Class IV Long Period Ground Motion (LPGM) results in people finding it impossible to move without crawling, fixtures on casters will move wildly and may fall over, unsecured furniture will be more likely to fall over and there will be many cracks in partition walls. Class III LPGM results in people finding it hard to stand, fixtures on casters will move about and unsecured furniture may fall over, and partition walls will crack. Class II LPGM will result in people finding it difficult to walk without holding onto something stable, fixtures on casters will move slightly and objects on shelves may fall. Class I LPGM will result in people feeling slight shaking and may feel startled, and hanging items like lamps and window blinds will move significantly.

JMA long period ground motion scale
Class	Prefecture	Location
IV	Fukushima	Nakadōri
III	Miyagi	Southern Miyagi, Northern Miyagi
III	Fukushima	Hamadōri
II	Iwate	Inland area of Southern Iwate
II	Miyagi	Central Miyagi
II	Akita	Inland area of Southern Akita
II	Yamagata	Shōnai (Shonai Region), Mogami (Mogami Region), Murayama (Murayama Region), (Okitama Region)
II	Fukushima	Aizu
II	Ibaraki	Northern Ibaraki, Southern Ibaraki
II	Tochigi	Northern Tochigi
II	Chiba	Northwestern Chiba
II	Kanagawa	Eastern Kanagawa
II	Niigata	(Kaetsu Region), (Chuetsu Region)
II	Yamanashi	Fuji Five Lakes, Eastern Yamanashi
II	Nagano	Central Nagano
I	Hokkaido	Central Tokachi, Eastern Oshima
I	Aomori	Northern Tsugaru, Southern Tsugaru, Sanpachi Kamikita, Shimokita
I	Iwate	Inland area of Northern Iwate, Coastal area of Northern Iwate
I	Akita	Coastal area of Southern Akita, Coastal area of Northern Akita, Inland area of Northern Akita
I	Tochigi	Southern Tochigi
I	Gunma	Southern Gunma
I	Saitama	Chichibu Region, Northern Saitama, Southern Saitama
I	Chiba	Northeastern Chiba, Southern Chiba
I	Tokyo	23 Special wards, Eastern Tama
I	Kanagawa	Western Kanagawa
I	Yamanashi	Central and Western Yamanashi
I	Nagano	Southern Nagano
I	Shizuoka	Central Shizuoka, Eastern Shizuoka
I	Aichi	Western Aichi

== Foreshocks and aftershocks ==
2021 Miyagi–Fukushima earthquake
Time (UTC)	Location	Magnitude	Depth (km)	MMI	Ref.
2021-01-28 18:24:08	near the east coast of Honshu	4.3	39.4	-	
2021-02-01 08:34:47	78 km east of Namie	4.6	44.7	II	
2021-02-03 06:47:06	34 km south of Ōfunato	4.2	66.8	-	
2021-02-04 03:40:13	10 km north northeast of Kitaibaraki	4.3	54.9	I	
2021-02-13 14:07:48	72 km east southeast of Namie	7.1	44.0	VIII	
2021-02-13 14:36:42	60 km east northeast of Namie	4.9	59.8	V	
2021-02-13 14:51:42	69 km east northeast of Namie	5.4	50.3	IV	
2021-02-13 16:14:41	71 km east northeast of Namie	4.3	52.0	-	
2021-02-13 16:32:58	70 km east northeast of Namie	4.4	56.5	-	
2021-02-13 18:25:28	53 km east southeast of Kamaishi	5.2	48.2	IV	
2021-02-14 07:31:49	44 km east of Namie	5.1	38.2	IV	
2021-02-14 07:59:23	67 km east northeast of Namie	4.5	53.6	-	
2021-02-14 09:26:58	69 km east of Namie	4.6	50.9	-	
2021-02-15 11:27:18	77 km east northeast of Namie	4.2	35.0	-	
2021-02-15 11:59:50	52 km east northeast of Namie	4.4	35.0	-	
2021-02-15 12:26:04	51 km east of Namie	5.3	35.6	III	
2021-02-15 12:26:18	34 km east of Namie	5.3	40.1	III	
2021-02-16 13:59:32	Kakuda	4.3	54.1	-	
2021-02-16 13:59:32	56 km east of Ishinomaki	4.6	45.0	-	
2021-02-18 06:02:43	59 km northeast of Namie	4.5	58.8	-	
2021-02-18 12:43:00	58 km east northeast of Namie	4.3	59.9	-	
2021-02-19 16:16:28	111 km east northeast of Hachinohe	5.0	46.1	II	
2021-02-19 19:01:06	66 km east northeast of Namie	4.5	60.3	-	
2021-02-20 01:17:05	42 km east of Ishinomaki	4.3	68.5	-	
2021-02-22 21:22:36	46 km east northeast of Namie	4.4	50.6	-	
2021-02-26 04:04:24	56 km east northeast of Namie	4.6	58.0	-	
2021-02-26 10:18:31	53 km east northeast of Namie	4.4	59.9	-	
2021-02-26 15:33:29	35 km southeast of Namie	4.6	79.5	-	
2021-02-26 17:03:48	89 km east northeast of Namie	4.7	51.4	II	
2021-03-07 03:42:19	15 km east southeast of Funaishikawa	4.2	54.3	-	
2021-03-07 12:44:27	61 km east northeast of Namie	4.2	60.5	-	
2021-03-08 14:36:06	65 km east northeast of Namie	4.6	59.2	-	
2021-03-08 23:29:58	34 km south southwest of Ōfunato	4.9	83.3	III	
2021-03-17 08:28:49	58 km east northeast of Namie	5.0	45.9	IV	
2021-03-20 21:56:36	80 km east of Namie	4.7	54.5	-	
2021-05-13 23:58:14	76 km east northeast of Namie	6.0	32.0	IV	

=== Other events ===
Nine days after the 10th anniversary of the March 2011 tragedy, a strong 7.0 M_{w} or 6.9 M_{JMA} earthquake struck 80 km north of the epicenter of the February 2021 event. The earthquake struck at 18:09 local time, 54 km (34 mi) beneath the coast of Miyagi Prefecture. A tsunami warning for waves up to 1 m (3 ft 3 in) was broadcast but was rescinded shortly after. So far, a few injuries have been reported and there is no serious structural damage to buildings. The same prefecture was also significantly affected by the Fukushima earthquake. It is unknown if the 20 March event is related to the earthquake a month earlier but both were a result of thrust faulting on or near the subduction zone and in the zone of rupture of the 2011 quake.

== Earthquake and tsunami warnings ==
The Japan Meteorological Agency issued an Earthquake Early Warning at 23:08:10.2 or 10 seconds after the earthquake was detected, in all of Miyagi and Fukushima prefecture, the Murayama and Oki districts in Yamagata prefecture, and the northern and southern inland areas of Iwate prefecture. Announcements were made in the northern Ibaraki prefecture. Warnings were issued shortly after at 23:08:33.8 to Aomori prefecture's Nanbu, Akita prefecture's southern part, Iwate prefecture's northern and southern coast, Yamagata prefecture's Mogami and Shonai regions, southern Ibaraki prefecture, Tochigi Prefecture and Gunma Prefecture. The follow-up report of the emergency earthquake bulletin was announced in Saitama prefecture, northern Chiba prefecture, and the Kaetsu and Chuetsu regions of Niigata prefecture.

Many television channels were interrupted by early warnings of the earthquake broadcast by the JMA. Scheduled programs in television stations across the country was replaced by live coverage of the earthquake shortly after it struck. Regular programs resumed after several hours or days of emergency coverage of the earthquake. In response, viewers in some areas were free from viewing fees for stations including Fuji TV and NHK, which exempted fees for viewers in the affected areas for two months.

== Tsunami ==
Because of the earthquake's focal depth and size, no formal warning was issued to the Japanese coast. Seven minutes after the earthquake, the Japan Meteorological Agency projected "slight sea level fluctuation" to occur along the Tōhoku and Kanto coasts. A non-destructive 20 cm (7.9 in) tsunami was observed at a port in Ishinomaki, Miyagi Prefecture at 01:44 on 14 February. Waves of 10 cm (3.9 in) was observed in ports in Sendai and Soma at 01:21 and 02:48, respectively.

== Casualties ==
On 23 February, the body of a man in his 50s was discovered by a family member, buried under furniture at his house in Fukushima City. Local government officials said the man had suffocated as he was pinned under a piece of furniture that fell during the earthquake. His estimated time of death was just after 23:07 local time on 13 February. He is the only identified fatality from the earthquake and the first earthquake-related fatality in Japan since 2018. A second death was also reported in Fukushima Prefecture. In Iwanuma, Miyagi Prefecture, another man in his 50s died—the cause of death was not publicized but police described it as a "direct death".

The earthquake left at least 186 people injured across nine prefectures, with most of them in Fukushima Prefecture, according to the Fire and Disaster Management Agency. There, about 100 people were reported hurt. In Miyagi, the earthquake injured 63 residents, with 30 reports from Sendai. There were 17 people injured in Yamagata, Ibaraki, Gunma, Tochigi, Saitama, Chiba, and Kanagawa prefectures. Most of the injuries reported were minor, caused by glass cuts, however, 16 victims were seriously injured.

One person was seriously injured in Ōshū, Iwate, and was the only casualty in the prefecture. In Miyagi Prefecture, one victim was reported each in the cities of Ishinomaki, Kurihara and Higashimatsushima, all with severe wounds. Another fifty-eight individuals in Miyagi suffered light injuries. From Fukushima Prefecture, four residents, two from Fukushima City and one each from Koriyama and Koori were inflicted with lacerations and bruises. At least 95 others in the prefecture were injured as well. Other prefectures including Ibaraki, Tochigi, Gunma, Saitama, Chiba, and Kanagawa, also reported one or more residents with profound or minor injury.

== Impact ==
According to the General Insurance Association of Japan as of 12 May 2021, at least 221,994 insurance claims had been filed for in damages caused by the earthquake. At least 112,047 claims were from Miyagi Prefecture and 81,538 from Fukushima Prefecture. Claims were also filed in other prefectures including Iwate, Yamagata, Ibaraki, Tochigi, and Saitama. The number of claims from these prefectures were collectively counted at 28,409. Of the nearly 222,000 filed claims, some 165,866 of them were settled and 133,359 claims were paid were done. The total number of claim payments made is estimated at ¥138,275,181 or about US$1,262,528. In April, before paid claims totaled the US$1 billion mark, the Catastrophe Risk Evaluation and Standardizing Target Accumulations organization said that the earthquake could result in a billion dollars' worth of losses and insurance claims for the insurance and reinsurance industry.

According to a government spokesman, more than 950,000 homes did not have access to power, and many power plants throughout the country went offline. Fukushima Prefecture was the hardest hit with most of the casualties and damage reported. Miyagi Prefecture also reported substantial damage and had the second-highest casualty numbers by prefecture, behind Fukushima. Thirty-two houses, two in Miyagi and 30 in Fukushima prefectures were totally destroyed by the earthquake. Another 259 suffered serious structural damage in Fukushima, Miyagi, and Saitama prefectures. In Yamagata Prefecture, 15 residential buildings sustained some minor damage. Other locations including Iwate, Chiba, Kanagawa, Niigata, and Tokyo had between one and four buildings damaged, although they were minor. In total, 19,758 buildings throughout the area suffered damage, with 798 buildings completely destroyed.

The most severely affected city was Sōma, located some 40 kilometers (25 mi) north of the Fukushima Daiichi Nuclear Power Plant. In the same location, a car ran into the path of a rockfall, resulting in the driver sustaining a minor neck injury. A 100-meter-long (330 ft) section of the fishing port in the city experienced vertical displacement of up to 10 centimeters (3.9 in). The port also suffered liquefaction when sand erupted from fissures in the asphalt. There were also reports of conflagrations from local authorities.

In Sendai, the walkway of an apartment block on the second floor collapsed. No one was injured from the collapse, however, one resident was trapped for a while and later rescued through a window.

At least 311 schools in Fukushima and Miyagi prefectures sustained damage such as cracked walls and floors, broken windows as well as burst water pipes. This prompted the closure of 71 schools in both prefectures.

Small fires broke out in Sendai and Shiogama in Miyagi as a result of the earthquake. One involved a dress shop while the other was in an apartment. They were both extenguised by the fire department with no casualties known.

Footage and images circulating online suggest that minor damage including broken glass and collapsing facades were caused by the shaking. Home videos taken during the earthquake also show cabinets and shelves toppling over. In Tokyo, the earthquake caused buildings to sway about.

=== Historical sites ===
The Zuihōden Temple in Aoba-ku, a ward in Sendai, was one of the historical sites damaged by the earthquake. About 100 stone lanterns and tombstones collapsed as a result of the earthquake. The main shrine structure remained intact without any major damage. A thorough investigation to determine the condition of the structure and repair cost would be carried out, according to a spokesman. The same temple suffered substantial damage during the 2011 earthquake when its stone wall was brought down, and 200 lanterns and tombstones were destroyed.

The earthquake also caused structural damage to the Shiroishi Castle in Shiroishi, Miyagi. Cracks were reported in the exterior walls on the third floor of the castle's tower. In response, all admissions to the castle were canceled. Aftershocks, wind and rain in the days following the earthquake caused damage at the castle's tower to spread further. Inspectors said some of the castle tower walls have to be replaced entirely due to the severity of the damage. The estimated cost of damage in Shiroishi City is ¥500 million while at the castle, ¥200 million.

At the Inari Shrine area in Fukushima, a piece of a stone lantern fell from a height of five meters onto a parked car, greatly deforming the car. There were no occupants in the car at the time of the incident. The main shrine itself was not damaged and therefore reservations for normal shrine affairs carried on.

=== Industrial facilities ===
According to the Tokyo Electric Power Company (TEPCO), no abnormalities or changes in radiation levels were detected immediately after the earthquake. Approximately 20 minutes after the shock, a nuclear alert order was issued and both the water treatment and transfer facilities were shut down. Inspections began some 50 minutes after the quake but no anomalies in the reactor units were found. Subsequent inspections the next day also showed no unusual changes to radiation level and the nuclear alert order was rescinded at 2:00 pm on 14 February.

About a week after the earthquake, TEPCO stated that water levels in reactor Units 1 and 3 which were crippled by the 2011 nuclear meltdown had dropped by several tens of centimeters, and has continued to fall each day. Water used to cool the nuclear fuel had been leaking from the damaged units since the earthquake occurred. In reactor Unit 1, the water level fell by some 40 to 70 centimeters beginning on Monday while reactor Unit 3 began leaking on Sunday, lowering the water level by 30 centimeters. TEPCO further reassured that were no change in radiation levels following the earthquake.

A TEPCO spokesperson said that leaking water is contained within the reactor buildings and is not exposed to the outside environment. This additional damage may cause further implications in the decommissioning process of the nuclear power plant which is expected within several decades. Additional water is needed to cool the melted nuclear fuel to compensate for these new leaks.

At the Eneos Sendai refinery in Tagajō and Shichigahama cities, overflows and leakage were reported by the FDMA. Approximately 10 liters of kerosene leaked from a damage pipeline at a dangerous goods factory was discovered. Quick response after the discovery prevented the leakage from contaminating the sea. The FDMA said that no serious damage was reported to the tanks and roofs. Water leakage was also reported in several other industrial areas.

=== Transportation ===
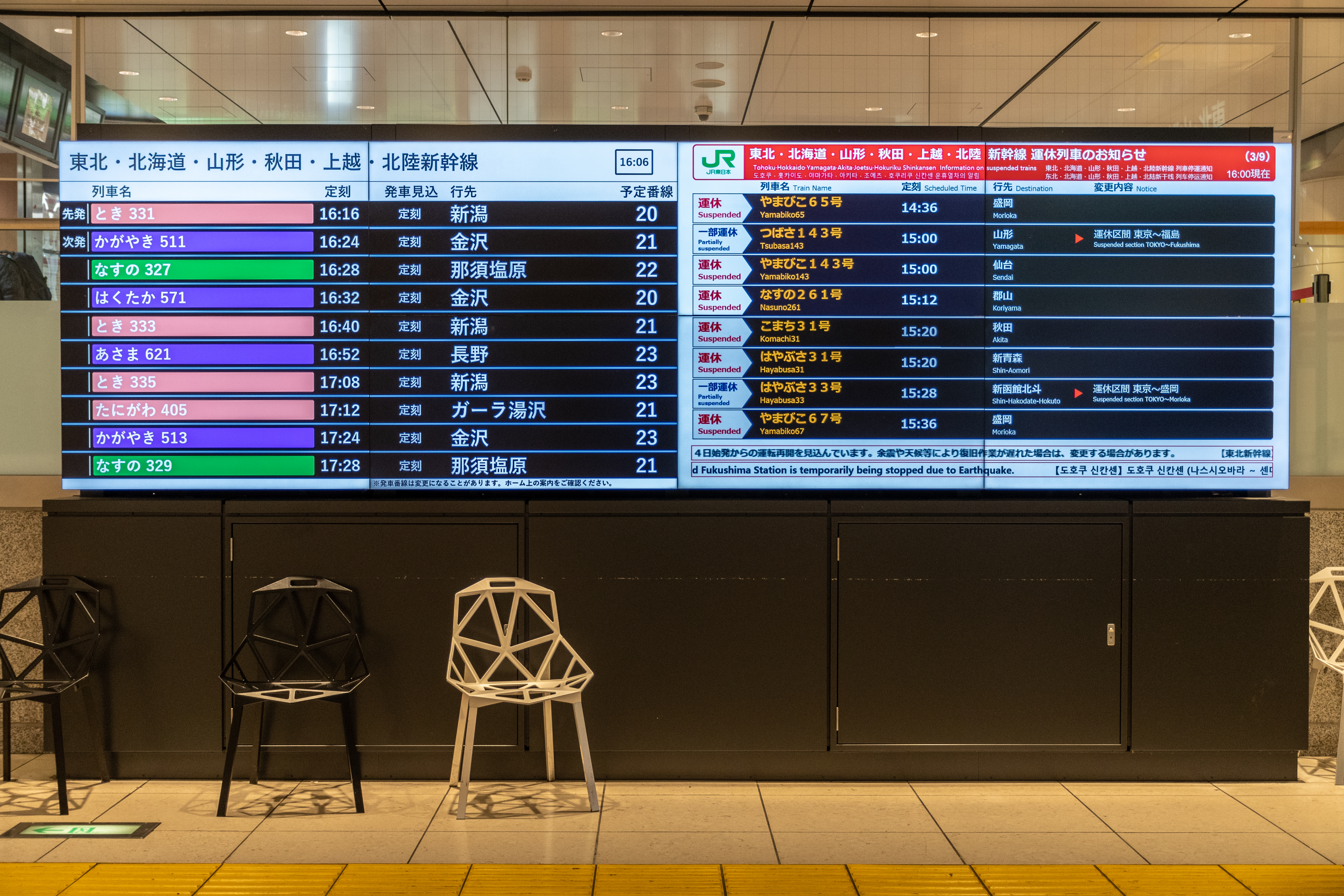
Schedule of the Tohoku-Hokkaido Shinkansen which was suspended due to the earthquake.

The East Japan Railway Company suspended their Tōhoku–Hokkaidō, Akita, and Yamagata Shinkansen services after an inspection revealed damage to various pieces of equipment. In Kōriyama City, the earthquake snapped utility poles off their base along the railway line. The railway company had mentioned that operations between Nasushiobara and Morioka stations would be suspended for around 10 days to allow for repair works. In response to the disaster, service was reduced to one train per hour between Tokyo and Nasushiobara stations.

The Jōetsu and Hokuriku Shinkansen also experienced a brief suspension of service but resumed regular operation shortly after.

Services on the two Mini-shinkansen lines (Akita and Yamagata Shinkansen) were scheduled to be restored by 15 February between their northern termini and their respective endpoints along the Tōhoku Shinkansen.

Commuter rail lines were also affected, with the Tōhoku Main Line and Jōban Line experiencing delays of various extents. In addition, all services on the Abukuma Express Line were suspended indefinitely.

Due to the suspension of the Shinkansen, Japan Airlines and All Nippon Airways (ANA) set up extra flights to the airports of several cities cut off from the Shinkansen network including: Akita Airport, Aomori Airport, Fukushima Airport, Hanamaki Airport, Sendai Airport, Shonai Airport, and Yamagata Airport. These additional flights were scheduled through 15 February. Supplemental bus services began operations on behalf of JR Bus Tōhoku. JR Bus Tōhoku added more than 20 service routes connecting Fukushima and Sendai stations to the nation's capital, Tokyo.

On the Jōban Expressway, landslides buried parts of the roadway, and embankments along it collapsed; however, no vehicles were trapped inside the debris. A 10-meter-long (33 ft) section of the expressway at another location was uplifted. In response, the East Nippon Expressway Company deployed heavy equipment to remove boulders and clear up debris along the expressway. By 17 February, the blockages along the expressway were cleared allowing traffic to resume along the route. Fences were also erected along the stricken sections of the expressway to prevent further rockslides.

=== University exams ===
As a result of the temporary suspension of the Tōhoku-Hokkaido Shinkansen, some students from six prefectures in the Tohoku region were unable to take entrance exams administered by some private universities at the designated venues. In response, some universities postponed the test dates or conducted a retest altogether.

At Tōhoku University, a test venue for an exam administered by the Faculty of Law was changed from the Kawauchi Campus to the Katahira Campus when issues regarding the seismic integrity of the structure arose following the earthquake.

The entrance examination commencement time for students at the Faculty of Economics at Chuo University was set an hour later than the intended time of 10:30 on 14 February at their venue in Sendai. A similar situation occurred at Hosei University in four of their faculties when exams were delayed for one hour and a half the same day. These universities had expected that some students may not arrive at the venue on time because of the earthquake.

Keio University said that students affected by the interruption of service along the Tōhoku Shinkansen would be able to sit for exams conducted by the Faculty of Law and Faculty of Letters on 9 March. Exams were originally held on 15 and 16 February.

Both Waseda University and Hosei University made statements that a pass/fail grading would be made based on performance in a previous test to students who are unable to take the exams.

=== Sports and entertainment ===
The Japan Professional Basketball League which scheduled to host a match between the Sendai 89ers and Gunma Crane Thunders at the Xebio Arena Sendai, and the Fukushima Firebonds and Ehime Orange Vikings at the Fukushima City National Athletic Meet Memorial Gymnasium on February 14 were suspended due to damage found at the hosting venues. Hotel accommodations for some teams were also damaged or had basic needs cut-off, forcing the event to be postponed.

Damage such as falling ceiling panels and sprinkler system issues causing water leakage were documented at the Fukushima Race Course, as well as racing facilities. The Japan Racing Association said that horse racing events originally intended to begin on April 10 in Fukushima was to be suspended until May 2, while an alternate racing event was held in Niigata.

A landslide in Nihonmatsu partially buried the Ebisu Circuit, a race track located along the slopes of a mountain. The landslide took with it cars and a double-story building, eventually burying them. The race track also cracked as a result of the ground slumping.

The television broadcast of the sixth episode of the second season of World Trigger was delayed to an unspecified time.

Japanese pop singer Kohmi Hirose whose concert was to be held on February 14 at the Sendai PIT in Sendai City was rescheduled for March 7.

== Government response ==
=== Cabinet reaction ===
At 23:09 on February 13, the government set up an official residence countermeasures office at the Prime Minister's Office Crisis Management Center. In addition, on the morning of the 14th, a ministerial meeting was held at the Prime Minister's Office to confirm the policy of making every effort for disaster emergency measures. According to Prime Minister Yoshihide Suga, the affected local governments were closely cooperating and would be on constant vigilance about the secondary disasters such as aftershocks and landslides. The Prime Minister's Office also promised to take thorough infection measures during the recovery efforts in the COVID-19 infections in Japan.

Japanese Prime Minister Yoshihide Suga was informed of the damage and casualties and later confirmed that there were no deaths in the aftermath of the earthquake. His statement would turn out false on 23 February when a fatality was confirmed. He warned of possible strong aftershocks in the next coming weeks.

=== Fukushima Prefecture ===
According to the Fukushima Prefectural Government, some 70 evacuation centers were set up, with around 200 people residing in them. The Japan Meteorological Agency also warned about the potential for landslides as the Tohoku and Kanto regions were issued storm warnings on two days after the initial earthquake.

=== Fire and Disaster Management Agency ===
The Fire and Disaster Management Agency headquarters in Iwate Prefecture experienced shaking intensities of Shindo 5 Lower. The agency requested the prefectures of Miyagi, Yamagata, Fukushima Prefecture, Ibaraki, Tochigi, and Saitama to report any damage observed and take the appropriate measures needed.

=== Ministry of Defense ===
On February 14, the Japan Ground Self-Defense Force aided in the supply of water to the towns of Shinchi and Tenei as requested by Masao Uchibori, the Governor of Fukushima when the towns suffered a water shortage.

== Impact overview ==
Statistic of impact by prefecture
Prefecture	Casualties			Property damage		
Prefecture	Fatalities	Serious injuries	Minor injuries	Completely destroyed	Partially destroyed	Partial damage
Iwate	1	1				2
Miyagi		6	58	3	92	9,337
Yamagata			1			15
Fukushima	2	4	95	66	636	10,394
Ibaraki			3			
Tochigi		3	5			
Gunma			1			
Saitama		1	2		1	
Chiba		1	1			4
Tokyo						3
Kanagawa			4			1
Niigata						2
Total	3	16	170	69	729	19,758

== See also ==
- List of earthquakes in 2021
- List of earthquakes in Japan
- List of foreshocks and aftershocks of the 2011 Tōhoku earthquake
- 2022 Fukushima earthquake
