= Shin-Sendai Thermal Power Station =

Power plant in Sendai, Japan

Shin-Sendai Thermal Power Station 新仙台火力発電所
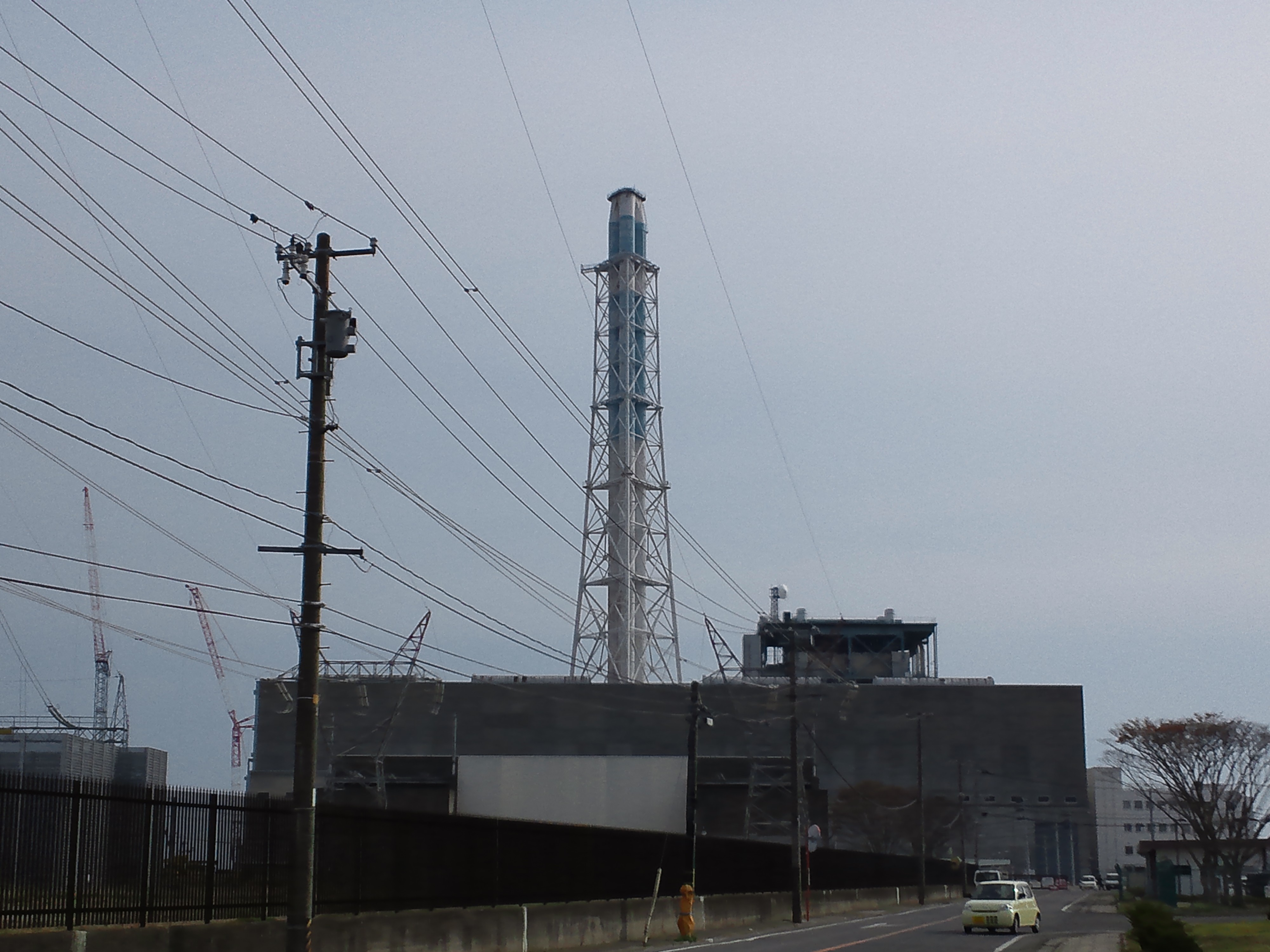
- Shin-Sendai Thermal Power Station
- Country: Japan Miyagi Prefecture#Japan
- Location: Miyagino-ku, Sendai, Miyagi, Japan
- Coordinates: 38°16′36.4″N 141°2′21.5″E
- Status: Operational
- Commission date: 1971
- Owner: Tohoku Electric
- Operator: Tohoku Electric Power

Thermal power station
- Primary fuel: LNG

Power generation
- Units operational: 1
- Units decommissioned: 2
- Nameplate capacity: 1046 MW

Shin-Sendai Thermal Power Station (新仙台火力発電所, Shin-Sendai Karyoku Hatsudensho) is an LNG-fired thermal power station operated by Tohoku Electric in Miyagino-ku, Sendai, Miyagi Prefecture, Japan. The facility is located on the Pacific coast near the Port of Sendai.

== History ==
The Shin-Sendai Thermal Power Station was built in 1959 to supply power to the Sendai metropolis and surrounding Miyagi Prefecture. Unit 1 started operation in August 1971, followed by Unit 2 in June 1973. In 2006, Tohoku Electric announced a plan to abolish both units and to build two new high-efficiency More Advanced combined cycle (MACC) power generation facilities to reduce carbon emissions and lower operating costs.

Operations were temporarily suspended due to damage caused by the Tōhoku earthquake and tsunami in March 2011. Unit 1 was already stopped for maintenance, but Unit 2 was forced to make an emergency shutdown when its turbine house was flooded by the tsunami. Unit 1 resumed full output on December 27, but a decision was reached not to repair Unit 2 and it was subsequently scrapped by the end of the year.

Along with the new power generation units, a new LNG receiving facility was constructed. This facility was purpose-built to accommodate the Q-Flex series of liquefied natural gas carriers from Qatar.

Unit 3-1 came on line in December 2015, followed by Unit 3–2 in July 2016. From July 18, 2017, the rated output of Unit 3 was upgraded from 980,000 kW to 1,046,000 kW due to operational experience and software modifications.

== Plant details ==
Unit	Fuel	Type	Capacity	On line	Status
1	Heavy Oil	Steam turbine	350 MW	1971	Decommissioned 2015; Scrapped
2	Heavy Oil / Crude Oil / LNG	Steam turbine	600 MW	1973	Decommissioned 2011; Scrapped
3-1	LNG	MACC	523 MW	2015	operational
3-2	LNG	MACC	523 MW	2016	operational

== See also ==
- Energy in Japan
- List of power stations in Japan
