= Diastrophism =

Deformation of the Earth's crust

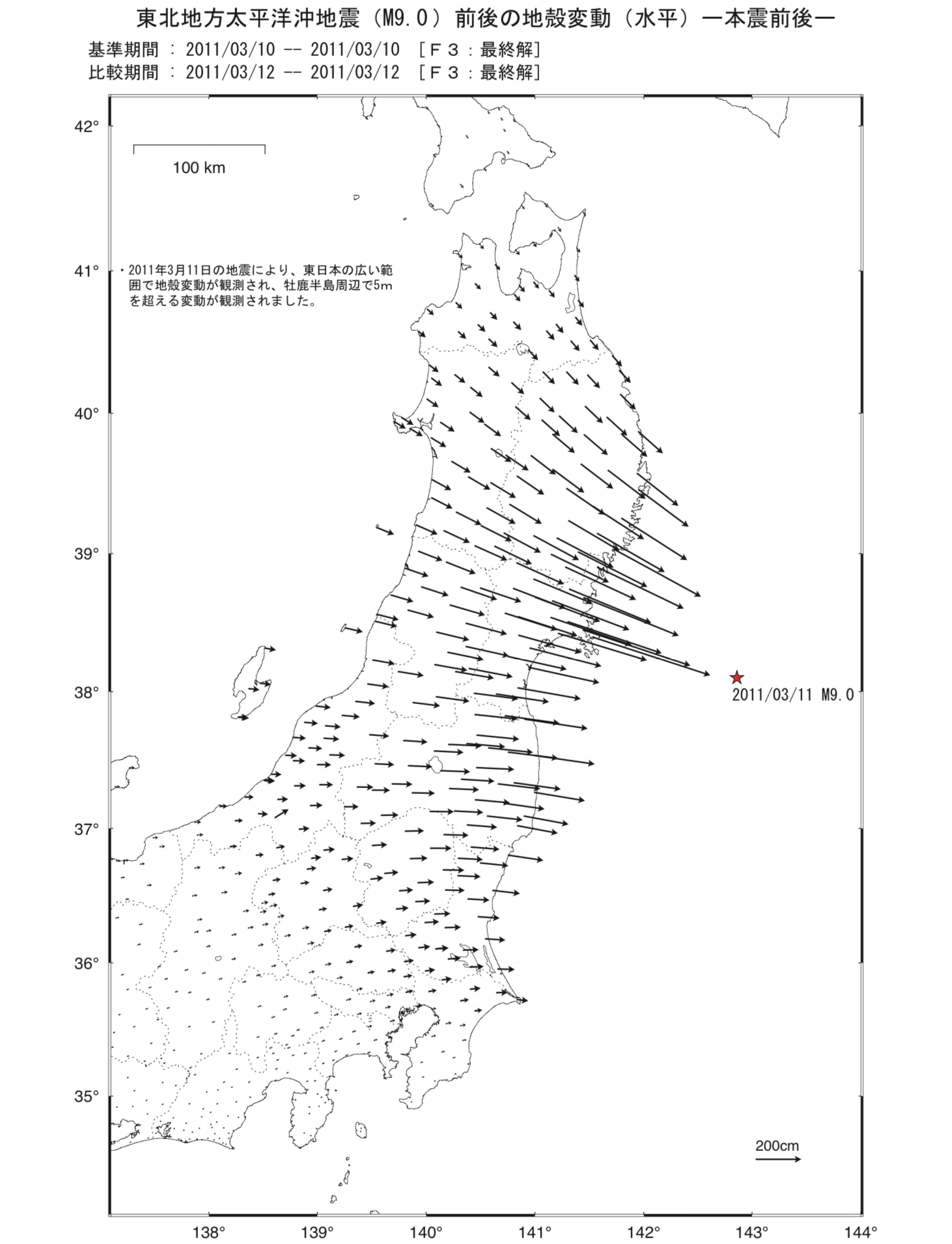
Diastrophism by 2011 Tohoku earthquake

Diastrophism is the process of deformation of the Earth's crust which involves folding and faulting. Diastrophism can be considered part of geotectonics. The word is derived from the Greek διαστροϕή diastrophḗ 'distortion, dislocation'.

Diastrophism covers movement of solid (plastic) crust material, as opposed to movement of molten material which is covered by volcanism. Movement causes rock to be bent or broken. The most obvious evidence of diastrophic movement can be seen where sedimentary rocks have been bent, broken or tilted. Such non-horizontal strata provide visual proof of movement. Diastrophic movement can be classified as two types, folding and faulting, tilted beds usually are part of a larger syncline or anticline. Diastrophic movement is often called orogenic as it is associated with mountain building.

There are various theories of the cause of diastrophic movement such as being the result of pressures exerted by convection currents in the mantle or the rise of magma through the crust. Other deformations are caused by meteorite impact and combinations of gravity and erosion such as landslides and slumping.

The study of diastrophism encompasses the varying responses of the crust to tectonic stresses. These responses include linear or torsional horizontal movements (such as continental drift) and vertical subsidence and uplift of the lithosphere (strain) in response to natural stresses on Earth's surface such as the weight of mountains, lakes, and glaciers. Subsurface conditions also cause subsidence or uplift, known as epeirogeny, over large areas of Earth's surface without deforming rock strata. Such changes include the thickening of the lithosphere by overthrusting, changes in rock density of the lithosphere caused by metamorphism or thermal expansion and contraction, increases in the volume of the asthenosphere (part of the upper mantle supporting the lithosphere) caused by hydration of olivine, and orogenic, or mountain-building, movements.

== Historical development of the concept ==
By the end of the 19th Century it was generally accepted that the cause of folding and faults was lateral compression that resulted from a shrinking Earth caused by its gradual cooling. In the late 19th Century, Eduard Suess proposed his eustatic theory that provided the underpinnings for Chamberlin's explanation of diastrophism.

In volume two of Das Antlitz der Erde Suess set out his belief that across geologic time, the rise and fall of sea levels were mappable across the earth, that is, that the periods of ocean transgression and regression were correlatable from one continent to another. Suess postulated that as sediments filled the ocean basins the sea levels gradually rose, and periodically there were events of rapid ocean bottom subsidence that increased the ocean's capacity and caused the regressions. Chamberlin proposed that instead of a thermal contraction, diastrophic movement was caused by gravitational contraction. In the United States, it was not until the late 1960s that thermal convection replaced the shrinking Earth theories.
