= Japan Meteorological Agency magnitude scale =

Seismic magnitude scale

The Japan Meteorological Agency magnitude scale (Japanese: 気象庁マグニチュード) is a seismic magnitude scale set by the Japan Meteorological Agency.

== Overview ==
In Japan, for shallow (depth < 60 km) earthquakes within 600 km, the Japan Meteorological Agency (JMA) calculates a magnitude labeled MJMA, M_{JMA}, or M_{J}. (These should not be confused with moment magnitudes JMA calculates, which are labeled M_{w}(JMA) or M^{(JMA)}, nor with the Shindo intensity scale.) JMA magnitudes are based (as typical with local scales) on the maximum amplitude of the ground motion; they agree "rather well" with the seismic moment magnitude M_{w} in the range of 4.5 to 7.5, but underestimate larger magnitudes.

== Sources ==
- Katsumata, A. (June 1996), "Comparison of magnitudes estimated by the Japan Meteorological Agency with moment magnitudes for intermediate and deep earthquakes.", Bulletin of the Seismological Society of America, 86 (3): 832–842, Bibcode:1996BuSSA..86..832K, doi:10.1785/BSSA0860030832, S2CID 130279928.
- Bormann, P.; Wendt, S.; Di Giacomo, D. (2013), "Chapter 3: Seismic Sources and Source Parameters", in Bormann (ed.), New Manual of Seismological Observatory Practice 2 (NMSOP-2), doi:10.2312/GFZ.NMSOP-2_ch3, archived from the original (PDF) on 2019-08-04.
- Bormann, P.; Saul, J. (2009), "Earthquake Magnitude" (PDF), Encyclopedia of Complexity and Applied Systems Science, vol. 3, pp. 2473–2496.
- Doi, K. (2010), "Operational Procedures of Contributing Agencies" (PDF), Bulletin of the International Seismological Centre, 47 (7–12): 25, ISSN 2309-236X, archived from the original (PDF) on 2022-01-20. Also available here (sections renumbered).
