= CRESTA =

- Catastrophe Risk Evaluation and Standardizing Target Accumulations
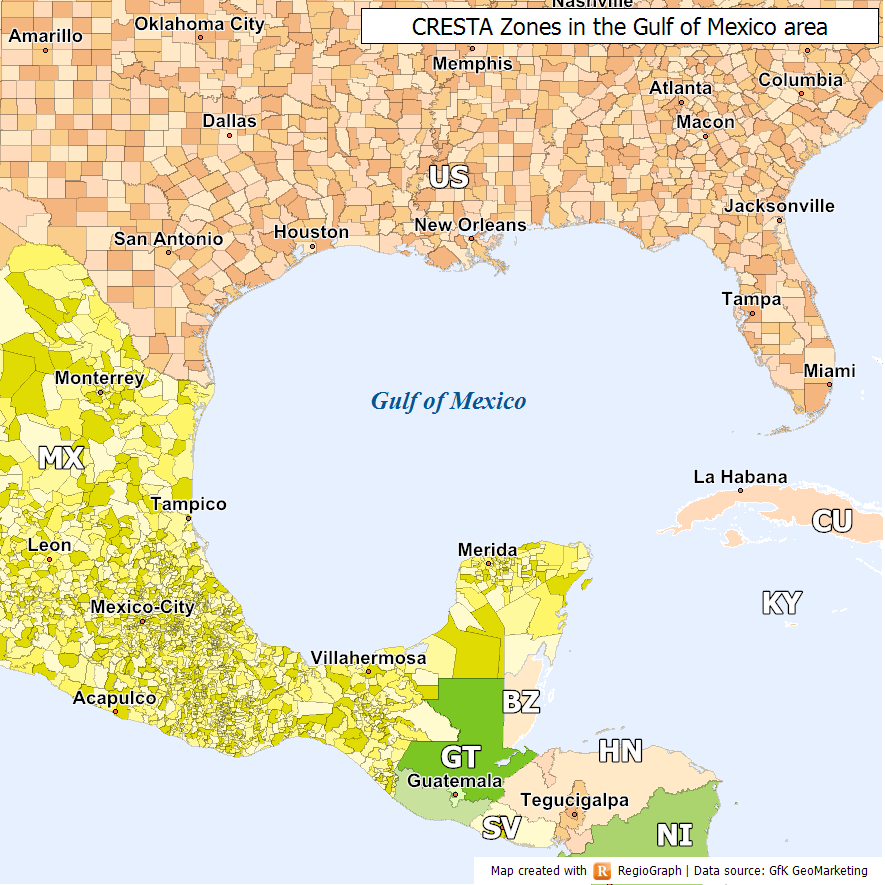
- Map sample of the CRESTA system. It shows individual zones in the Gulf of Mexico region; within a zone the risk is for insurance considered to be equal
- Abbreviation: CRESTA
- Named after: The Cresta hotel
- Formation: 1977; 49 years ago
- Founder: Insurance industry
- Type: Independent body
- Purpose: Technical management of natural catastrophe insurance
- Location: Zurich, Switzerland
- Region served: Worldwide
- Products: Cresta zones and maps
- Fields: Insurance and re-insurance
- Board of directors: Cresta Advisory Board made up of representatives from a number major insurance industry organisations
- Parent organization: Perils Cresta AG
- Funding: Selling access to maps and risk data
- Website: www.cresta.org

CRESTA (Catastrophe Risk Evaluation and Standardizing Target Accumulations) is a global natural hazard risk categorization system for insurance and re-insurance companies.

It was founded as a joint project of Swiss Reinsurance Company, Gerling-Konzern Globale Reinsurance Company, and Munich Reinsurance Company and is an independent group which promotes the accurate and efficient mapping and evaluation of catastrophe perils. CRESTA has set itself the aim of establishing a globally uniform system for the accumulation risk control of natural hazards - particularly earthquakes, storms and floods. Those risk zones are essentially based on the observed and expected seismic activity, as well as on other natural disasters, such as droughts, floods and storms.

CRESTA zones regard the distribution of insured values within a region or country for easier assessment of risks. CRESTA Zones are the essential basis for reinsurance negotiation and portfolio analysis. Since its creation, CRESTA sets widely accepted standards which apply throughout the international insurance industry. CRESTA zone information is used by most insurers for assessing the insurance catastrophe premiums they will charge.

== Origin of the name ==
While the acronym CRESTA stands for Catastrophe Risk Evaluation and Standardizing Target Accumulations, the name was derived from the name of the hotel (Cresta Hotel) where the founding meeting occurred, and the subsequent creation of a suitable acronym to correspond to the name.

== Tasks ==
CRESTA's main tasks are:

- Determining country-specific zones for the uniform and detailed reporting of accumulation risk data relating to natural hazards and creating corresponding zonal maps for each country.
- Drawing up standardised accumulation risk-recording forms for each country.
- Working out a uniform format for the processing and electronic transfer of accumulation risk data between insurance and reinsurance companies.

In addition, CRESTA also undertakes the following activities:

- Collating relevant scientific and insurance-related data dealing with insurance and natural phenomena in a written record.
- Collecting summaries of information dealing with natural phenomena for each country, in particular relating to earthquakes.
- Collecting information on natural hazards for each country which is of relevance to the insurance and reinsurance industry.

== Hazard and disaster risk Assessment ==
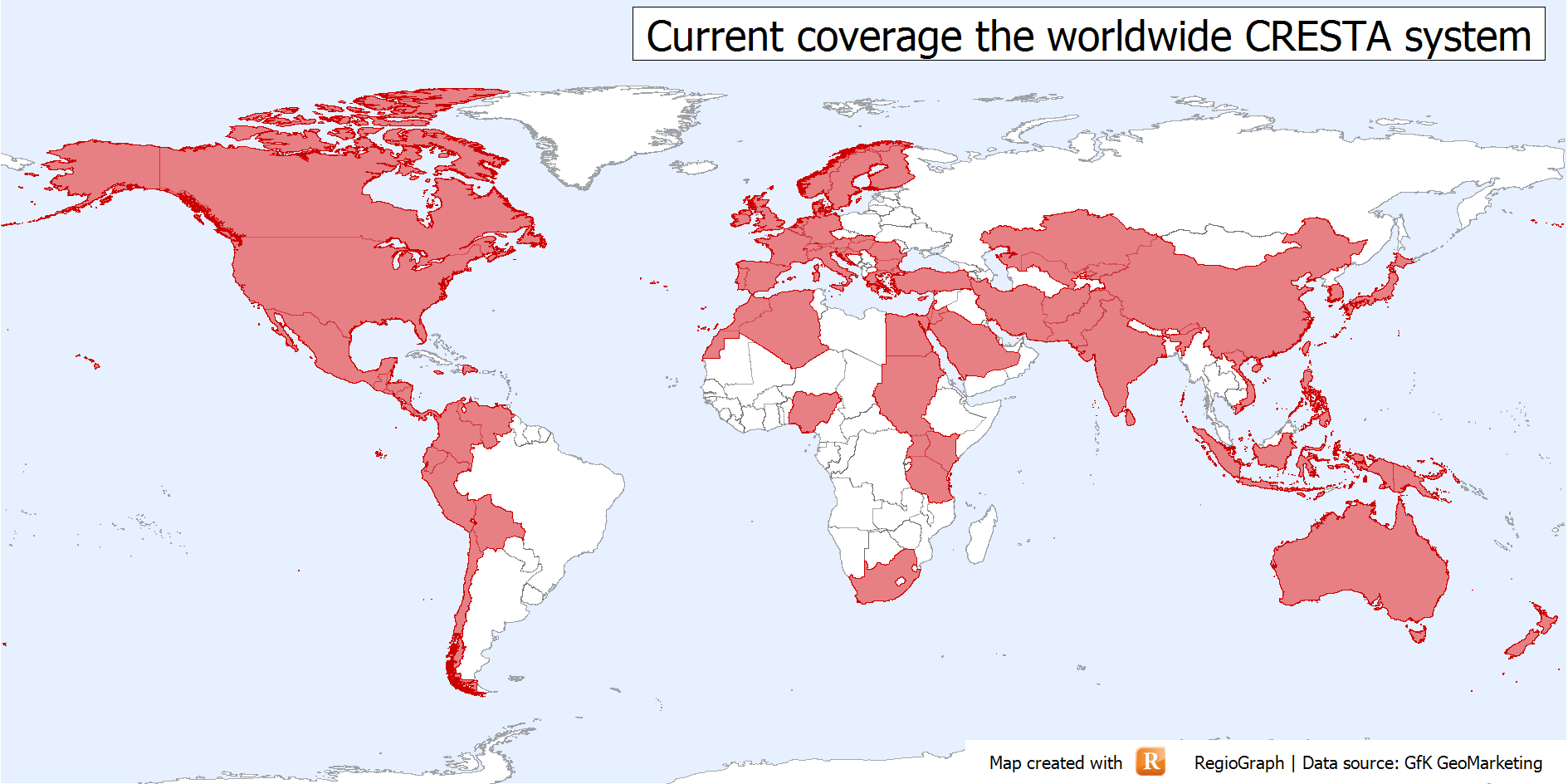
Overview of the worldwide CRESTA (Catastrophe Risk Evaluating and Standardizing Target Accumulations)coverage.

There is basically no risk that cannot be insured against, however it is difficult to assess how risky it is to give out insurance contracts to customers and to assess for insurance providers how high their rates should be. One main indicator for every insurer is the premiums that are paid for their reinsurance. When applying for reinsurance the forms will often be based on the models provided by CRESTA.

CRESTA most importantly established a worldwide zone classification used within the insurance industry, the CRESTA Zones. The CRESTA Zones are defined for much of the world down to postcode level. CRESTA Zones can form the basis of reinsurance negotiation and portfolio analysis.

In order for an insurer to calculate the risk distribution in their portfolio for each natural disaster type, accumulations of insured property in individual CRESTA Zones will be taken into account.

In seismic risk analysis, for example, a successful loss estimation of insured and reinsured values depends on the seismic hazard analysis, on the vulnerability of facilities and on the ability to calculate the earthquake risk premium, also known as average annual loss (AAL). CRESTA is simply one of the biggest, if not the most comprehensive and most actual information resource for natural risks and hazards.

On the downside, CRESTA specific information is not available freely. CRESTA zone information can either be bought directly from CRESTA or bundled with map systems.

CRESTA zoning uses a simple rating scheme, where the higher the zone rating, the higher the exposure to that hazard. For example, Earthquake Exposure Zone 0 is low exposure, while Zone 4 is the highest.
