= March 2021 Miyagi earthquake =

Earthquakes in Japan

March 2021 Miyagi earthquake (宮城県沖地震)
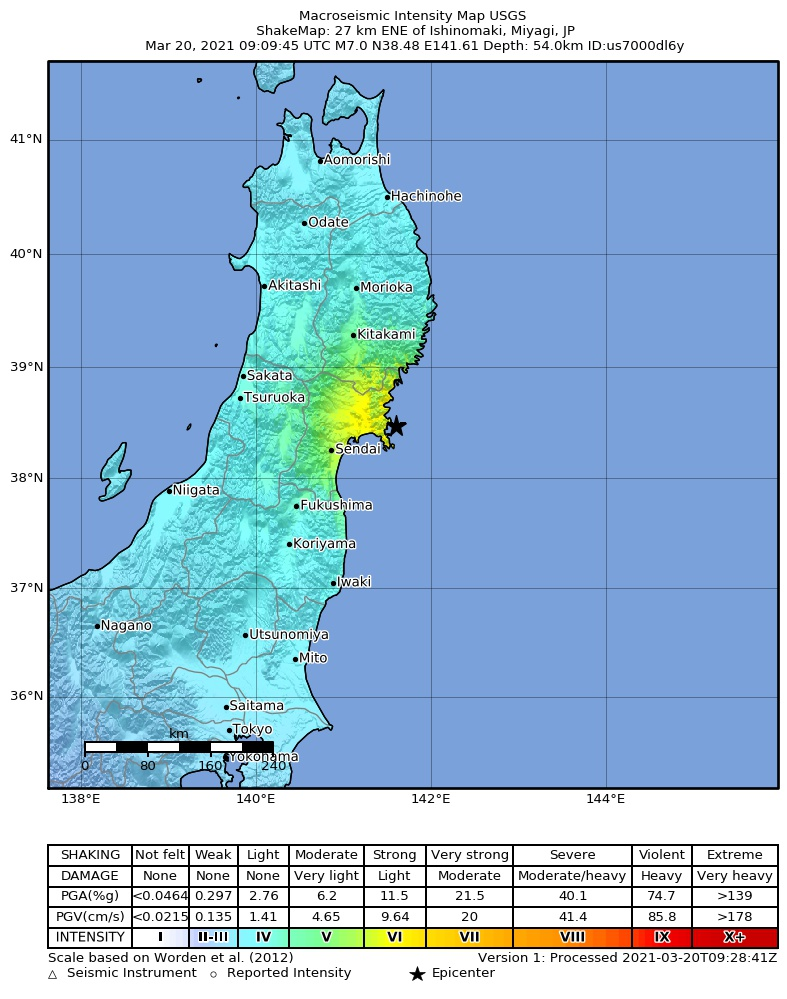

- Location within Japan
- UTC time: 2021-03-20 09:09:45
- ISC event: 620172298
- USGS-ANSS: ComCat
- Local date: 20 March 2021
- Local time: 18:09:45
- Magnitude: 7.0 M_{w} (USGS); 6.9 M_{JMA} (JMA)
- Depth: 43.0 km (26.7 mi)
- Epicenter: 38.475°N 141.607°E
- Fault: Japan Trench
- Total damage: ¥63.4 billion ($550 million USD)
- Max. intensity: MMI VII (Very strong) JMA 5+
- Casualties: 11 injured

On March 20, 2021, at 18:09 JST (09:09 UTC), a magnitude 6.9 or 7.0 earthquake struck offshore east of Tōhoku, Japan at a depth of 54.0 kilometers (33.6 mi) to 60 kilometers (37 mi). It had a maximum JMA intensity of Shindo 5+ while on the Mercalli intensity scale, it was rated VII (Very strong). Power outages and some slight damage in Miyagi were reported.

A press release by the Japan Meteorological Agency stated that the earthquake was an aftershock of the 2011 Tōhoku earthquake and tsunami from ten years prior.

== Earthquake ==
The earthquake occurred as the result of thrust faulting near the subduction zone interface plate boundary between the Pacific and North America plates. Moment tensor solutions indicate that slip occurred either on a moderately dipping fault striking to the south, or a moderately dipping fault striking to the north-northeast, consistent with the east–west oriented compression expected in this region. At the location of this earthquake, the Pacific plate moves approximately westward relative to the North American plate at a velocity of 70 mm (2.8 in) per year, subducting beneath Japan at the Japan Trench and dipping to the west beneath Japan. The earthquake epicenter is located 70 km (43 mi) west of the epicenter of the March 2011 earthquake. It came just nine days after the tenth anniversary of the March 11, 2011 disaster, and just over a month since a M_{JMA}7.3 earthquake struck south of the March 20 event.

=== Intensity ===
Japan Meteorological Agency seismic intensity by selected location (only locations with Shindo 5 Lower and higher are shown)
Intensity	Prefecture	Location
5+	Miyagi	Higashi-matsushima, Ishinomaki, Iwanuma, Matsushima, Misato, Osaki, Sendai, Tome, Wakuya, Zaō
5−	Miyagi	Kakuda, Kawasaki, Kesennuma, Kurihara, Marumori, Minami, Natori, Ogawara, Ohira, Osata, Rifu, Sendai, Shibata, Watari, Yamomoto
5−	Iwate	Ichinoseki, Ofunato, Sumita
5−	Fukushima	Futaba, Iitate, Kunimi, Minami, Namie, Okuma, Shinchi, Soma, Tamura

== Aftershocks ==
2021 Miyagi earthquake aftershocks
Time (UTC)	Location	Magnitude	Depth (km)	MMI	Ref.
2021-03-20 09:09:44	29 km east northeast of Ishinomaki	7.0	43.0	VII	
2021-03-20 09:34:58	47 km east southeast of Ishinomaki	4.6	61.1	-	
2021-03-20 16:41:17	49 km east southeast of Ishinomaki	4.3	61.4	-	
2021-04-03 12:58:26	38 km east southeast of Ōfunato	4.6	41.8	-	
2021-04-06 20:10:34	96 km east southeast of Ishinomaki	4.2	25.1	-	
2021-04-14 10:02:52	115 km east southeast of Ishinomaki	4.3	37.8	-	
2021-04-16 11:51:37	68 km east of Ishinomaki	4.5	51.7	-	
2021-04-18 00:29:11	57 km east of Ishinomaki	5.6	41.0	IV	
2021-04-18 00:29:25	53 km east southeast of Ishinomaki	5.6	31.4	IV	
2021-04-19 04:06:21	42 km south southeast of Ishinomaki	4.9	56.4	-	

== Impact ==
The earthquake caused 11 minor injuries in the prefectures of Iwate, Miyagi and Fukushima. Many of the injured were from Miyagi Prefecture. Four individuals from Sendai, Miyagi endured slight injuries. In Morioka, Iwate, a woman fell and suffered cuts. Two elderly women aged 90 and 70 sustained minor head and shoulder injuries respectively when they were struck by furniture in Iwanuma, Miyagi. There was one injury each reported in Date, Ishinomaki, Kesennuma and Tōno.

Power outages were reported in some parts of Tohoku, forcing the suspension of bullet train services by the East Japan Railway Company. In Shiogama, a six-meter (20 ft) wall supporting an inclined surface breached and collapsed during the earthquake.

As a precaution, authorities from the Tohoku Electric Power utility shut down the Onagawa Nuclear Power Plant whilst the Tokyo Electric Power Company checked the conditions at the Fukushima Daiichi Nuclear Power Plant. No radiation anomalies or changes in cooling water levels were detected at the power plant.

A New Japan Pro Wrestling event in Sendai was temporarily halted mid-match due to the earthquake, which was captured by cameras recording the show. The event resumed approximately half an hour later after safety checks were carried out.

=== Tsunami warning ===
Following the earthquake, a tsunami advisory was issued at 18:11 JST for Miyagi Prefecture for waves of up to 1 meter (3 ft 3 in). Despite the warnings, no tsunamis were observed; this is because the earthquake had ruptured a deeper portion of the subduction zone. The tsunami advisory was then withdrawn at around 19:30 JST.

== Other events ==
On May 1, at 10:27 local time, a M_{w} 6.9 or M_{JMA} 6.6 earthquake struck the southern tip of the Oshika Peninsula. The earthquake had a depth of 43.0 km or 66 km and a maximum intensity of VI (Strong) or Shindo 5 upper. According to the Japan Meteorological Survey, the earthquake would not be considered an aftershock of the 2011 Great East Japan earthquake as such announcements had ceased as of April 1 of 2021. This is due to the decreasing rate of earthquakes which made it harder to determine if events like those of May 1 were actual aftershocks. The agency also could not determine if this event was related to the earthquake of March 20.

Minor damage including broken windows and a water pipe rupture was reported. The earthquake resulted in the suspension of Shinkansen services in the Tohoku region. In addition, three people sustained minor injuries. Two of the victims were using a hot spring at Onagawa Station when the quake struck and shattered window panels. A third individual from Soma City in Fukushima Prefecture fell while shopping at a supermarket and was taken to a hospital for treatment.

== See also ==
- List of earthquakes in 2021
- List of earthquakes in Japan
- 2021 Fukushima earthquake
- April 2011 Miyagi earthquake
- 2012 Kamaishi earthquake
