= 2016 Fukushima earthquake =

Earthquake in Japan

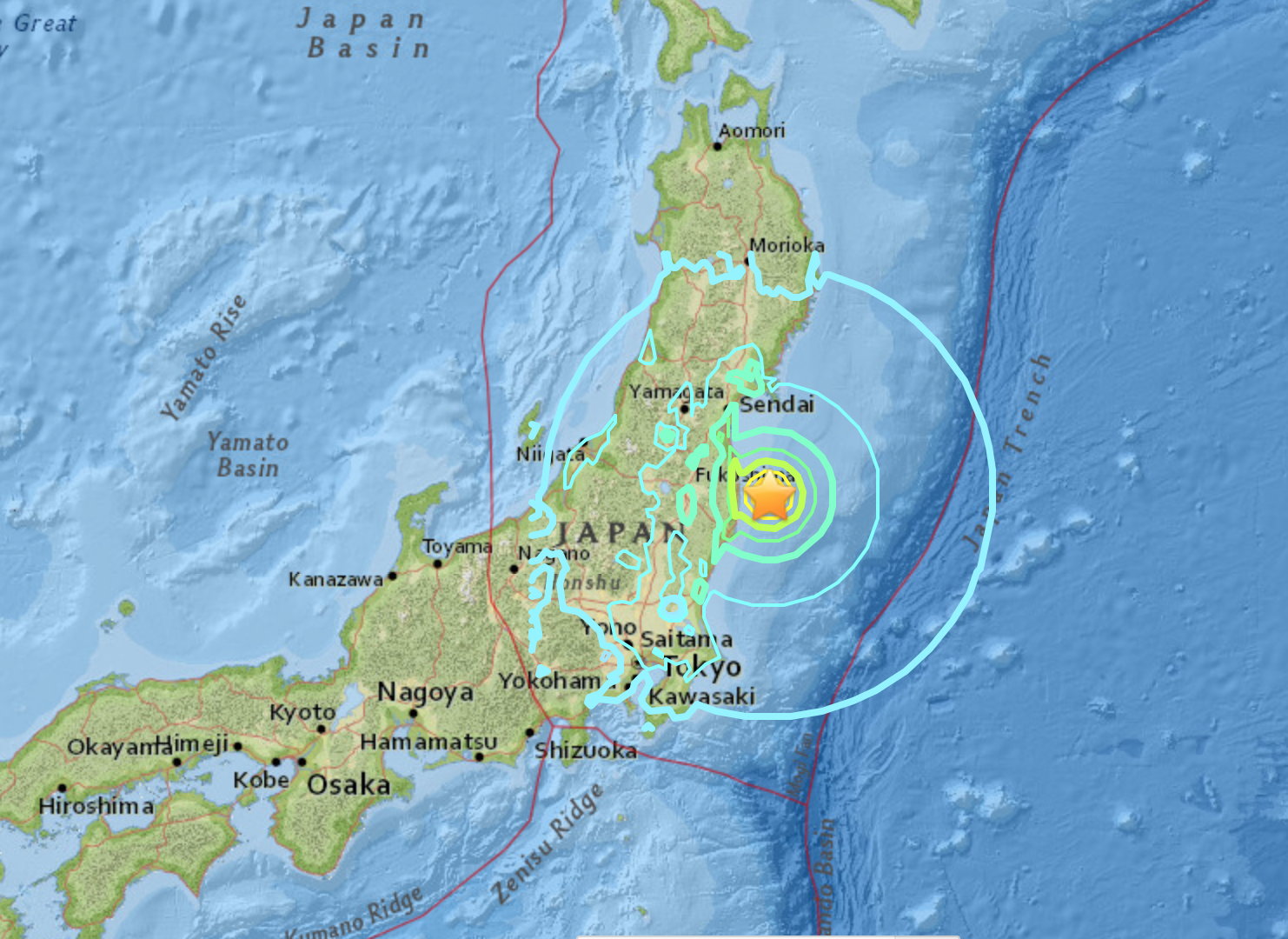

- Location within Japan
- UTC time: 2016-11-21 20:59:49
- ISC event: 615057144
- USGS-ANSS: ComCat
- Local date: November 22, 2016
- Local time: 05:59:49 JST
- Magnitude: 7.4 M_{JMA} 6.9 M_{w}
- Depth: 11.4 km (7 mi)
- Epicenter: 37.392°N 141.403°E
- Areas affected: Japan
- Max. intensity: JMA 5− (MMI VII)
- Tsunami: Up to 4.3 metres (14 ft 1 in) on Miyato Island
- Aftershocks: 85
- Casualties: 17 injured (3 serious)

The 2016 Fukushima earthquake struck Japan east-southeast of Namie, Fukushima Prefecture at 05:59 JST on November 22 (20:59 Nov 21 UTC) with depth of 11.4 km (7.1 mi). The shock had a maximum intensity of VII (Very strong) on the Mercalli scale. The earthquake was initially reported as a 7.3 magnitude by Japan Meteorological Agency, and was later revised to 7.4, while the United States Geological Survey and GFZ Potsdam determined a magnitude of 6.9.

There were no deaths as a result of the earthquake, however seventeen people were injured; three of which were in critical condition. Minor damage was caused, with reports of fires. The Fukushima Daini Nuclear Power Plant had one of its spent fuel cooling systems shut down briefly, though no measurable change in radiation levels was detected. A tsunami warning was issued with waves predicted up to 3 metres (9 ft 10 in), though actual waves were recorded between 1 metre (3 ft 3 in) and 2 metres (6 ft 7 in) in height.

== Earthquake ==
The earthquake measured magnitude 7.4. It struck off mainland Japan 35 km (22 mi) east-southeast of Namie, Fukushima Prefecture at 05:59 JST on November 22, 2016 (20:59 Nov 21 UTC), at a depth of 9.0 km ± 1.7. The earthquake was initially reported as having a magnitude of 7.3 by the Japan Meteorological Agency, who later upgraded the magnitude to 7.4, while the United States Geological Survey and GFZ Potsdam reported it as having a magnitude of 6.9 M_{wb}.

The shock had a maximum intensity of VII (Very strong) on the Mercalli scale and 5 lower on the JMA scale. The Japan Meteorological Agency stated it was an aftershock of the 2011 Tōhoku earthquake. An intensity of VII is strong enough to cause damage to unsupported buildings and move heavy furniture.

The 2011 Tōhoku earthquake increased stress on the normal fault along Honshu's eastern coast on which the 2016 earthquake occurred. The 2011 and 2016 earthquake did not occur on the same fault with the later of the two taking place on a different fault of shallower depth. The mainshock of 2011 was followed by a series of aftershocks off Japan's eastern coast most of which didn't crest over a 5.0 in magnitude; being felt mainly along the Fukushima coastline.

== Tsunami ==
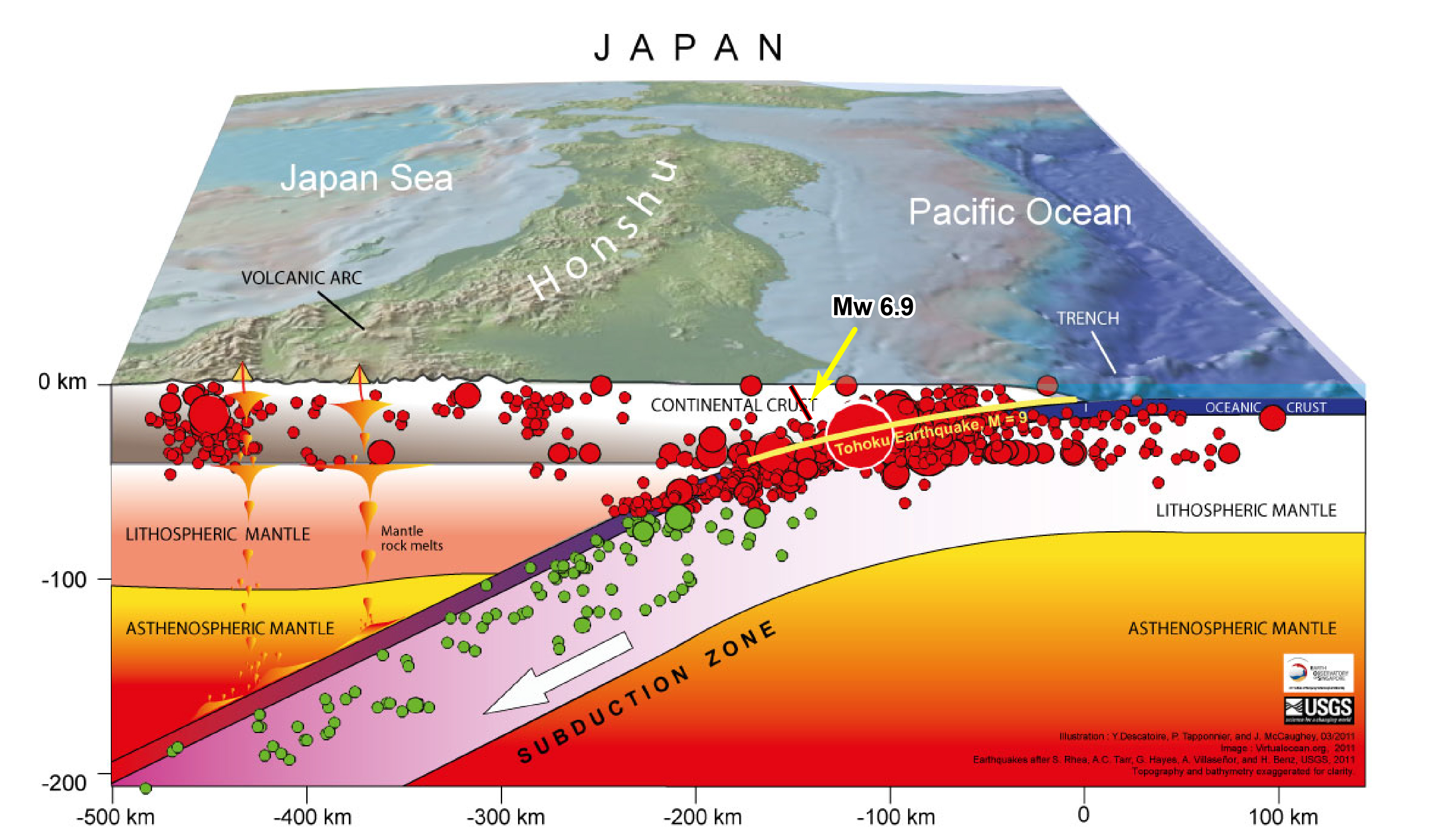
The schematic block diagram shows the location of the Mw 7.4 earthquake, which occurred within the overriding plate above the subduction zone interface that ruptured during the 2011 Tohoku-Oki earthquake.

Observed Maximum Tsunami Amplitude Along the East Coast of Japan
Prefecture	Location	Amplitude (m)	Time (JST)
Iwate Prefecture	Kuji Port	0.8	07:54
Iwate Prefecture	Miyako	0.4	08:09
Iwate Prefecture	Kamaishi	0.2	08:58
Iwate Prefecture	Ofunato	0.4	07:56
Miyagi Prefecture	Ayukawa	0.8	07:39
Miyagi Prefecture	Ishinomaki Port	0.8	08:11
Miyagi Prefecture	Sendai Port	1.4	08:03
Fukushima Prefecture	Soma	0.8	07:54
Fukushima Prefecture	Onahama	0.9	07:06
Ibaraki Prefecture	Oarai	0.6	06:49
Ibaraki Prefecture	Kashima Port	0.5	07:08
Chiba Prefecture	Okitsu	0.3	09:06
Chiba Prefecture	Mera	0.3	09:03
Tokyo	Yaene	0.3	07:13

Japanese authorities advised people in the coastal region of Fukushima to evacuate immediately due to a possible tsunami with waves of up to 3 metres (9 ft 10 in). Waves of up to one meter in height struck the Fukushima coast about an hour after the earthquake, and public broadcaster NHK reported the presence of a tsunami of 1.4 metres (4 ft 7 in) at Sendai, the capital city of Miyagi Prefecture. A later field survey found a local run up of 4.3 metres (14 ft 1 in) at Ohama Fishing Port on Miyato Island, Higashimatsushima where the wave damaged boats.

Roughly 3 minutes had passed after the earthquake when the first tsunami warning was issued; it went out to many coastal prefectures on the east side of Japan. The list of prefectures that were first warned includes Aomori Prefecture Pacific Coast, Iwate Prefecture, Miyagi Prefecture, Ibaraki Prefecture, Chiba Prefecture. Another warning was issued at 7:26 JST and more prefectures were included in this warning. Two more tsunami announcements were made at 8:09 and 9:46 and then all tsunami warnings were released for all forecast zones at 12:50.

Some of the forecasted wave heights were surpassed by those observed and the reverse also happened. It was forecast for both Central Hokkaido Pacific Coast and Western part of the Pacific coast of Hokkaido that they would only see slight sea level fluctuations, however they witnessed a maximum wave of 32 and 23 cm respectively. Most of the other maximum wave heights recorded did not reach the forecast height for their zones, notably the Miyagi and Fukushima Prefecture had a forecast of 3m when they reached 144 and 83 cm respectively.

Because the earthquake was generated via a shallow rupture of a normal fault the resulting tsunamis were confusing to experts, as a M 7.4 earthquake would normally only cause minor displacement to the seafloor and not be a tsunami hazard. The research team of Observational Seismology led by Wei Shengji surmised that a submarine landslide occurrence along a slope caused by the earthquake could cause higher tsunami waves produced in local regions.

== Impact ==
Shaking was felt as far North as Misawa, Aomori Prefecture (approx. 366 km away from the epicenter of the earthquake) and as far south as Kobe (approx. 637 km away from the epicenter of the earthquake) according to crowd-sourced data compiled by the USGS.

Seventeen people were injured during the earthquake, including broken bones and cuts from falling objects, three of which were serious injuries while only minor property damage was recorded. There was a fire at a research facility in Iwaki as well as a brief power outage was reported for about 1,900 houses. Finally, local and express trains, including the Shinkansen, were out of service for time to allow for the tracks to be inspected.

The earthquake caused the third reactor's spent fuel cooling systems of the Fukushima Daini Nuclear Power Plant to stop, though circulation was restored after about 100 minutes. The radiation levels were unchanged following the brief shutdown.

The Nikkei futures market in Japan was not significantly impacted.

== See also ==
- List of earthquakes in 2016
- List of earthquakes in Japan
- 2011 Tōhoku earthquake
- April 2011 Fukushima earthquake
- 2021 Fukushima earthquake
