= April 2011 Miyagi earthquake =

7.1 Mw earthquake near Miyagi Prefecture, Japan

- 2011年 宮城県沖地震
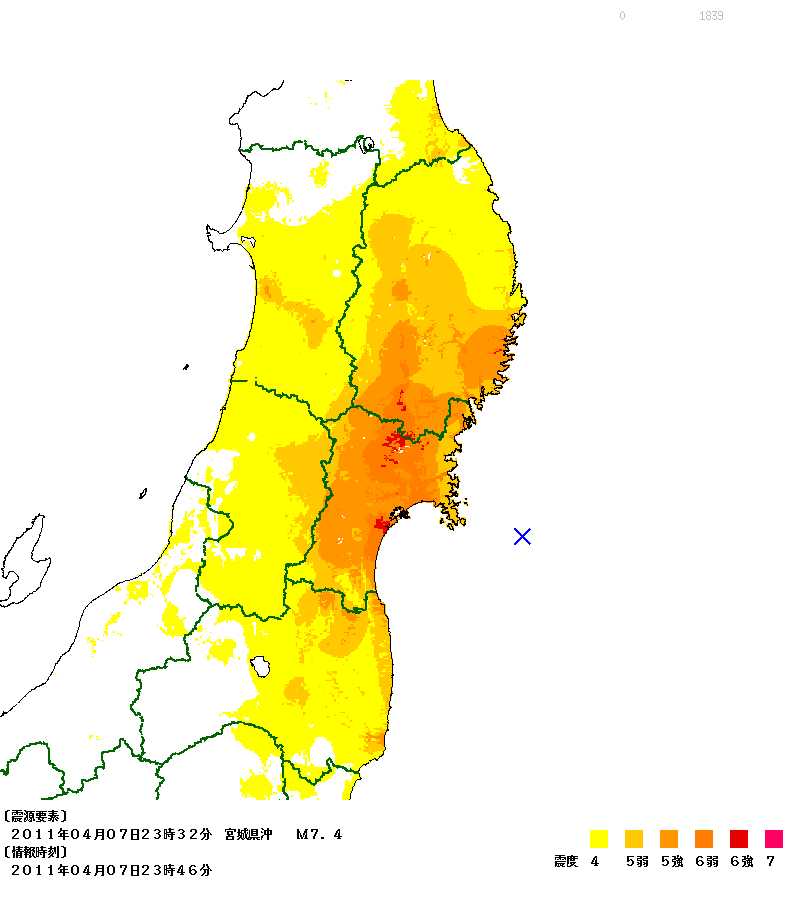
- UTC time: 2011-04-07 14:32:44
- ISC event: 16413596
- USGS-ANSS: ComCat
- Local date: 7 April 2011
- Local time: 23:32 JST
- Magnitude: 7.1 M_{w}
- Depth: 49 km (30 mi)
- Epicenter: 38.253°N 141.640°E
- Type: Thrust
- Areas affected: Japan
- Max. intensity: JMA 6+ (MMI VIII)
- Peak acceleration: 1.47 g
- Casualties: 4 confirmed dead, 141 injured

The April 2011 Miyagi earthquake (2011年 宮城県沖地震, 2011-Nen Miyagi-ken-oki jishin) occurred off the coast of Miyagi Prefecture, approximately 66 kilometres (41 mi) east of Sendai, Japan. The M_{w} 7.1 thrust earthquake was classified as an aftershock of the March 11 Tōhoku earthquake, and occurred at 23:32 JST (14:32 UTC) on Thursday, 7 April 2011.

Several tsunami warnings were issued for the northeastern coast of Honshu; however, they were all canceled 90 minutes later. Over 3 million households in the area were left without power, and several nuclear plants suffered minor malfunctions. There was no major structural damage, but the quake killed at least 4 people and injured 141.

== Earthquake ==
The M_{w} 7.1 submarine earthquake occurred at a focal depth of 49 km (30.4 mi) in the western Pacific Ocean on 7 April 2011 at 14:21 UTC, approximately 66 km (41 mi) east of Sendai. The quake was a direct result of thrust faulting on or near the subduction zone plate boundary between the Pacific and North American plates. Initially estimated at a magnitude of 7.4, the tremor was felt in several areas near the east coast of Honshu as an aftershock of the 11 March magnitude 9.0 megathrust Tōhoku earthquake. The aftershock sequence of this event is ongoing since 11 March, and includes over 58 earthquakes of magnitude 6.0 or greater up until 7 April 2011, with only two others of magnitude 7.0 or greater.

== Damage and casualties ==
Although the quake was located several miles offshore, moderate to very strong shaking was reported as far inland as Tokyo, about 333 km (207 mi) from the epicentre. Upon the detection of the earthquake, the Japan Meteorological Agency issued a tsunami warning for Miyagi Prefecture, as well as tsunami alerts for Iwate Prefecture, Fukushima Prefecture, Aomori Prefecture, Ibaraki Prefecture and the Pacific Rim. Waves of between 0.5 and 1 m were anticipated, and residents along coastal areas were urged to evacuate. All warnings and alerts were canceled within 90 minutes, however.

The tremor caused widespread power outages, with power still not restored to some 3.6 million households across several prefectures by 8 April. Nuclear power plants within the region also suffered from the outages; two of three power lines supplying power to fuel coolers were cut off at the Onagawa power plant. Radioactive water consequently leaked out of spent fuel pools at three of its reactors, though no change in the radiation levels outside the plant was reported. Five coal-powered power plants also shut down, adding to concerns over energy shortages. Fukushima I power plant, which had earlier been struck by the 11 March quake, evacuated its workers as a safety precaution, but the plant sustained no further damage from this quake.

Four people were reported dead as a result of the earthquake, including an elderly woman in Yamagata Prefecture who lost power to her medical ventilator. An additional 141 people suffered minor injuries, ranging from cuts and bruises to bone fractures. No major losses were reported, though some roads sustained damage, as well as a few homes. The Nikkei index fell sharply at the close of trading, but rebounded the next day when reports of limited damage were confirmed.

== See also ==
- List of earthquakes in 2011
- List of earthquakes in Japan
- March 2021 Miyagi earthquake
