= List of megathrust earthquakes =

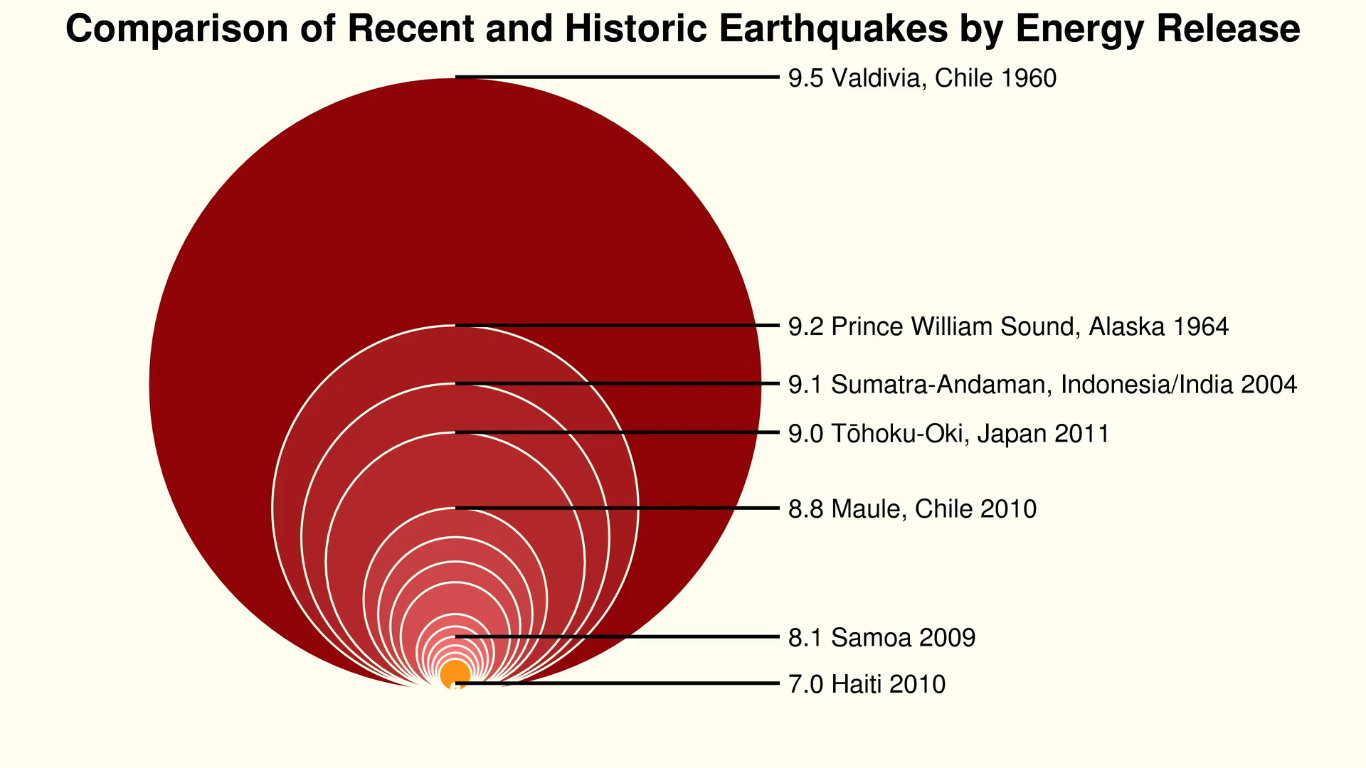
Comparison of recent and historic earthquakes by energy release.

Megathrust earthquakes are large seismic events that take place along convergent plate boundaries, particularly at subduction zones. Examples of subduction zones include the Sumatra and Java trenches, Nankai Trough and Peru–Chile Trench which are frequent sources of these earthquakes.

== List ==
The inclusion criteria in this list is any notable subduction earthquake of at least magnitude 8.0.

=== Pre-11th century ===
Date	Time‡	Location	Fatalities	Mag.	Effects/notes	More information
60 BC		Cabo de São Vicente, Portugal	Unknown	8.5	Possible tsunami. Considered the oldest record of an earthquake in the Portuguese earthquake catalogs.	
21 July 365 AD		Crete, Greece	Thousands	8.5	Devastation in Cyrene & Alexandria by a tsunami. Uplift of up to 9 metres in Crete. Maximum intensity XI (Extreme).	365 Crete earthquake
26 November 684 AD		Nankai Trough, Japan	Unknown	8.4		684 Hakuhō earthquake
13 July 869 AD		Sanriku, Japan	1,000	9.0	Major tsunami. Several hundred villages destroyed.	869 Jōgan earthquake
26 August 887 AD		Nankaido, Japan	Unknown	8.6	Major tsunami recorded in Osaka Bay. Landslides reported.	Tōkai earthquakes
11 December 1096 AD		Nankaido, Japan	Unknown	8.4	Destructive earthquake and tsunami, damaging many homes and shrines.	Tōkai earthquakes
22 February 1099 AD		Nankai Trough, Japan	Unknown	8.4		Nankai earthquakes

=== 11th–18th century ===
Date	Time‡	Location	Fatalities	Mag.	Effects/notes	More information
8 August 1303	"dawn"	Crete, Greece	4,000	8.0	Maximum intensity IX (Violent). Tsunami damage in Alexandria, Egypt and along the Syrian coast. Many buildings damaged in Cairo due to the earthquake.	1303 Crete earthquake
3 August 1361		Tokai region, Japan	Unknown	8.5		1361 Shōhei earthquake
31 August 1420	02:00 (local time)	Caldera, Chile	Unknown	9.4		1420 Caldera earthquake
20 September 1498	08:00 (local time)	Nankaido, Japan	41,000	8.6	Major tsunami.	1498 Nankai earthquake
6 June 1505		Nepal; India	Thousands	8.8	At least 30% of the Nepalese population perished(Ref. Population of Nepal-est. 2 Million). Extreme damage in Nepal and northern India.	1505 Lo Mustang earthquake
16 December 1575	14:30 (local time)	Valdivia, Chile	1,500	9.0	Maximum intensity X (Extreme).	1575 Valdivia earthquake
22 January 1582	16:30 (local time)	Arequipa, Peru	"many"	8.4	Maximum intensity X (Extreme). Many buildings collapsed or were severely damaged.	
17 March 1584		Lima, Peru	Unknown	8.4	Maximum intensity VII (Very strong). Severe damage in Lima.	
11 June 1585		Aleutian subduction zone, Alaska	Unknown	9.2	Tsunami killed natives in the Hawaiian Islands and reported in Japan.	1585 Aleutian Islands earthquake
9 July 1586		Lima, Peru	22	8.5	Maximum intensity X (Extreme). 1,000 km by 120 km area of Peruvian coastline severely affected. A significant local tsunami was reported in Lima. The tsunami was confused with that of the Aleutian Islands event in tsunami catalogs.	1586 Lima-Callao earthquake
28 February 1600	20:00 (local time)	Omate, Peru	Unknown	8.1		
24 November 1604	13:30 (local time)	Arica, Peru	100	9.0		1604 Arica earthquake
20 October 1609	01:00 (local time)	Peru	Unknown	8.6		
2 December 1611	10:30 (local time)	Sanriku Coast, Japan	5,000	8.1		1611 Sanriku earthquake
14 February 1619	16:30 (local time)	Trujillo, Peru	350	8.6		
1 August 1629	Nighttime	Banda Sea, Dutch East Indies (present-day Indonesia)	5	8.8	Major tsunami.	1629 Banda Sea earthquake
13 May 1647	22:30 (local time)	Santiago, Chile	1,000	8.5		1647 Santiago earthquake
15 March 1657	20:00 (local time)	Concepción, Chile	40	8.3	Destructive tsunami. Concepción totally destroyed.	1657 Concepción earthquake
4 November 1677	20:00 (local time)	Boso Peninsula, Japan	569	8.6	Maximum intensity JMA 4. Likely a tsunami earthquake based on the disparity between felt intensity and tsunami size.	1677 Bōsō earthquake
20 October 1687	10:30 (local time)	Lima, Peru	5,000	8.7	8-meter tsunami in Peru. Tsunami reported in Japan.	1687 Peru earthquake
16 April 1690		(British Leeward Islands) Leeward Islands	Unknown	8.0	Maximum intensity IX.	
26 January 1700	21:00 (local time)	Cascadia subduction zone, United States and Canada	Unknown	9.2	Tsunami in Japan and the Pacific Northwest.	1700 Cascadia earthquake
31 December 1703	02:00 (local time)	Boso Peninsula, Japan	10,000	8.2	Maximum intensity IX.	1703 Genroku earthquake
28 October 1707	14:00 (local time)	Japan	5,000	8.7	Tsunami	1707 Hōei earthquake
4 May 1714	Night	Main Himalayan Thrust, Bhutan	Many	8.1		1714 Bhutan earthquake
8 July 1730	04:45 (local time)	Valparaíso, Chile	Unknown	9.3	16-meter-high tsunami.	1730 Valparaíso earthquake
17 October 1737	03:00 (local time)	Kamchatka, Russian Empire	Many	9.3		1737 Kamchatka earthquake
28 October 1746	22:30 (local time)	Lima, Peru	5,941	8.8		1746 Lima-Callao earthquake
25 May 1751	01:00 (local time)	Concepción, Chile	65	8.5		1751 Concepción earthquake
1 November 1755	09:40 (local time)	Lisbon, Portugal	50,000	9.0	Tsunami.	1755 Lisbon earthquake
31 March 1761	12:01 (local time)	Lisbon, Portugal	Unknown	8.5	Tsunami.	1761 Lisbon earthquake
2 April 1762	17:00 (local time)	Myanmar; Bangladesh	200+	8.8	Local tsunami.	1762 Arakan earthquake
28 March 1787	11:30 (local time)	Oaxaca, New Spain (now Mexico)	Unknown	8.6	Tsunami.	1787 New Spain earthquake
July and August 1788		Alaska Peninsula, Alaska, Russia (now United States)	Unknown	8.0	Intensity VII. Major tsunami, 10 to 30 meters high. Many native Russians killed. The second earthquake triggered a 91-meter tsunami. Thought to be one earthquake rather than two.	
22 August 1792		Kamchatka Peninsula, Russia	Unknown	8.2		
10 February 1797	22:00 (local time)	Sumatra, Indonesia	Numerous	8.8		1797 Sumatra earthquake

=== 19th century ===
Date	Time‡	Location	Fatalities	Mag.	Effects/notes	More information
11 April 1819	15:00 (local time)	Copiapó, Chile	Unknown	8.5	M_{s} Copiapó totally destroyed by the earthquake. Caldera suffered massive damage. Minor tsunami.	1819 Copiapó earthquake
19 November 1822		Valparaíso Region, Chile	300	8.5	M_{s}	1822 Valparaíso earthquake
25 November 1833	22:00 (local time)	Sumatra, Indonesia	Unknown	9.2	Destructive tsunami.	1833 Sumatra earthquake
20 February 1835	11:30 (local time)	Concepción, Chile	50	8.5	M_{s} Large tsunami.	1835 Concepción earthquake
7 November 1837		Valdivia, Chile	12	9.5	M_{s}	1837 Valdivia earthquake
11 January 1839	06:00 (local time)	Martinique, Lesser Antilles	4,000	8.0		1839 Martinique earthquake
17 May 1841	08:00 (local time)	Kamchatka Peninsula, Russia	Unknown	9.0	6-meter tsunami.	1841 Kamchatka earthquake
8 February 1843	10:37 (local time)	Guadeloupe, Lesser Antilles	5,000	8.5		1843 Guadeloupe earthquake
7 April 1845		Oaxaca and Guerrero, Mexico	Unknown	8.0	Felt strongly in Mexico City, resulting in significant damage.	
25 November 1852	22:40 (local time)	Banda Islands, Banda Sea, Dutch East Indies (present-day Indonesia)	60	8.8	Tsunami up to 8 meters tall. Felt IX in Banda Neira.	
23 December 1854	09:00 (local time)	Nankai Trough, Japan	5,000	8.4	Major damage caused by tsunami inundation.	1854 Tōkai earthquake 1854 Nankai earthquake
24 December 1854	16:00 (local time)	Nankai Trough, Japan	5,000	8.4	Major damage caused by tsunami inundation.	1854 Tōkai earthquake 1854 Nankai earthquake
16 February 1861		Sumatra, Indonesia	Thousands	8.5		1861 Sumatra earthquake
17 November 1865		Pacific Ocean, Tonga	0	8.0	Felt in ships as well. Two-meter tsunami caused limited damage.	
13 August 1868	16:45 (local time)	Arica, Peru (now part of Chile)	25,000	8.8		1868 Arica earthquake
1873		Papua New Guinea	"Some"	8.0	Felt IX. Some damage to villages and people killed. Minor tsunami.	
28 March 1875		Pacific Ocean, New Caledonia	25	8.2	Four-meter tsunami caused at least 25 deaths.	
9 May 1877	21:16 (local time)	Iquique, Peru (now part of Chile)	2,385	8.9	Fiji accounts for most of the deaths attributed to the tsunami.	1877 Iquique earthquake
7 September 1882	03:50 (local time)	San Blas Islands, Colombia (now part of Panama)	250	8.3	Destructive tsunami	1882 Panama earthquake
6 September 1889	12:00 (local time)	Celebes Sea, Indonesia		8.0	Damaging tsunami up to 4 meters in height.	
15 June 1896	19:32 (local time)	Sanriku, Japan	22,066	8.5	Weakly felt earthquake but a major tsunami up to 38 meters in height.	1896 Sanriku earthquake
10 September 1899	12:22 (local time)	Yakutat Bay, Alaska	0	8.6	Large coastal uplift and tsunami.	1899 Yakutat Bay earthquakes

=== 20th century ===
Date	Time‡	Location	Fatalities	Mag.	Effects/notes	More information
22 September 1902	01:46	Guam, United States	0	8.1	Felt IX. No tsunami.	
31 January 1906	15:36	Ecuador; Colombia	500–1,000	8.8		1906 Ecuador–Colombia earthquake
17 August 1906	00:40	Valparaíso, Chile	4,000	8.2		1906 Valparaíso earthquake
4 January 1907	12:20 (local time)	Nias Island, Indonesia	2,188	8.2	Destructive tsunami, up to 15 meters high, killing most of the inhabitants.	1907 Sumatra earthquake
26 June 1917	05:49 (local time)	Pacific Ocean, Samoa	2	8.0	M_{w} 12.2-meter tsunami.	1917 Samoa earthquake
15 August 1918	20:18 (local time)	Mindanao, Philippines	52	8.3	M_{w}	1918 Celebes Sea earthquake
10 November 1922	23:53 (local time)	Atacama Region, Chile	~500	8.5	M_{w}	1922 Vallenar earthquake
3 February 1923	04:01 (local time)	Kamchatka Peninsula, Russia	3	8.4	M_{s} Felt XI. Tsunami.	February 1923 Kamchatka earthquake
14 April 1923	02:31 (local time)	Kamchatka Peninsula, Russia	36	8.2	M_{w} Felt X. Tsunami up to 30 meters.	April 1923 Kamchatka earthquake
1 September 1923	11:58 (local time)	Kantō Plain, Japan	148,000	7.9	M_{w} Felt XI. A conflagration and firenado killed tens of thousands in the Kantō Plain. Tsunami up to 12 meters caused extensive damage. One of the deadliest earthquakes in human history.	1923 Great Kantō earthquake
14 April 1924	16:20	Mindanao, Philippines	0	8.0	M_{w}	
3 June 1932	04:36	Jalisco, Mexico	400+	8.1	M_{w} Multiple mainshocks.	1932 Jalisco earthquakes
15 January 1934	08:43	Himalayas, Nepal and India	12,000	8.0	M_{w} Major damage in both countries. Widespread liquefaction.	1934 Nepal-India earthquake
24 May 1940	11:35	Lima, Peru	300	8.2	M_{w} Majority of the deaths were from Callao and Lima.	1940 Lima earthquake
13 May 1942	21:13 (local time)	Manabí Province, Ecuador	200+	8.3	M_{s}	1942 Ecuador earthquake
24 August 1942	17:40 (local time)	Lima, Peru	30	8.1	M_{w}	1942 Peru earthquake
6 April 1943	12:07 (local time)	Coquimbo Region, Chile	11	8.1	M_{w}	1943 Ovalle earthquake
7 December 1944	13:35 (local time)	Tōkai region, Japan	3,538	8.1	M_{w}	1944 Tōnankai earthquake
28 November 1945	01:26 (local time)	(British Raj) Balochistan, British India (present–day Pakistan)	4,000	8.0	M_{w} Tsunami.	1945 Balochistan earthquake
1 April 1946	03:29 (local time)	Aleutian Islands, Alaska	173	8.6	M_{w} Majority of the deaths was the result of the tsunami hitting Hawaii. One tsunami fatality in California.	1946 Aleutian Islands earthquake
21 December 1946	04:19 (local time)	Nankaidō, Japan	1,362+	8.3	M_{w}	1946 Nankai earthquake
4 March 1952	10:22 (local time)	Hokkaido, Japan	33	8.1	M_{w}	1952 Tokachi earthquake
5 November 1952	03:58 (local time)	Kamchatka Peninsula, Russia	2,500	9.0	M_{w} 5th largest in recorded history.	1952 Severo-Kurilsk earthquake
9 March 1957	04:22 (local time)	Andreanof Islands, Alaska	0	8.6	M_{w}	1957 Andreanof Islands earthquake
21 March 1960	02:07 (local time)	Miyako, Japan	0	8.0	M_{w}	
21 May 1960	06:02 (local time)	Concepción, Chile	125	8.1–8.3	M_{w} Foreshock to the next earthquake on 22 May.	1960 Concepción earthquakes
22 May 1960	15:11 (local time)	Valdivia, Chile	6,000	9.5	M_{w} The largest earthquake in recorded history.	1960 Valdivia earthquake
13 October 1963	15:17 (local time)	(Soviet Union) Kuril Islands, USSR (present-day Russia)	0	8.5	M_{w} One of the largest earthquake in recorded history.	1963 Kuril Islands earthquake
27 March 1964	17:36 (local time)	Prince William Sound, Alaska	131	9.2	M_{w} The second largest earthquake in recorded history.	1964 Alaska earthquake
3 February 1965	19:01 (local time)	Rat Islands, Alaska	0	8.7	M_{w} One of the largest earthquake in recorded history.	1965 Rat Islands earthquake
17 October 1966	16:42 (local time)	Huacho, Peru	100	8.1	M_{w}	1966 Peru earthquake
16 May 1968	09:49 (local time)	Hokkaido, Japan	52	8.2	M_{w}	1968 Tokachi earthquake
12 August 1969	08:27 (local time)	(Soviet Union) Kuril Islands, USSR	0	8.2	M_{w}	
3 October 1974	09:21 (local time)	Lima, Peru	78	8.1	M_{w}	1974 Lima earthquake
14 January 1976	16:47	Kermadec Islands, New Zealand	0	8.0	M_{s}	
16 August 1976	00:11 (local time)	Mindanao, Philippines	5,000–7,000	8.0	M_{w}	1976 Moro Gulf earthquake
12 December 1979	02:59 (local time)	Ecuador; Colombia	300–600	8.2	M_{w}	1979 Tumaco earthquake
3 March 1985	19:47 (local time)	Valparaíso Region, Chile	177	8.0	M_{w}	1985 Algarrobo earthquake
19 September 1985	07:17 (local time)	Michoacan, Mexico	9,500–45,000	8.0	M_{w} Had a devastating effect on Mexico City, where almost all the fatalities occurred.	1985 Mexico City earthquake
30 July 1995	14:59 (local time)	Antofagasta, Chile	2	8.0	M_{w}	1995 Antofagasta earthquake
9 October 1995	10:35 (local time)	Jalisco, Mexico	49–58	8.0	M_{w}	1995 Colima-Jalisco earthquake
17 February 1996	14:59 (local time)	Irian Jaya, Indonesia	166	8.1	M_{w}	1996 Biak earthquake

=== 21st century ===
Date	Time‡	Location	Fatalities	Mag.	Effects/notes	More information
23 June 2001	15:33 (local time)	Department of Arequipa, Peru	145	8.4	M_{w}	2001 southern Peru earthquake
26 September 2003	04:50 (local time)	Hokkaido, Japan	0	8.3	M_{w} Two missing, more than 840 injured.	2003 Tokachi earthquake
26 December 2004	07:58 (local time)	Aceh, Sumatra, Indonesia	227,898	9.2	M_{w} Indian Ocean basin-wide by teletsunami.	2004 Indian Ocean earthquake and tsunami
28 March 2005	23:09 (local time)	Nias and Simeulue, North Sumatra, Indonesia	1,314	8.6	M_{w}	2005 Nias-Simeulue earthquake
15 November 2006	20:14 (local time)	Kuril Islands, Russia	0	8.3	M_{w}	2006 Kuril Islands earthquake
2 April 2007	07:39 (local time)	Solomon Islands	112	8.1	M_{w} Including 60 missing.	2007 Solomon Islands earthquake
15 August 2007	18:40 (local time)	Department of Ica, Peru	595	8.0	M_{w}	2007 Peru earthquake
12 September 2007	18:10 (local time)	Bengkulu, Indonesia	25	8.5	M_{w}	2007 Bengkulu earthquakes
29 September 2009	06:48 (local time)	near Samoa and American Samoa, Pacific Ocean	189	8.1	M_{w} Doublet earthquake rupturing an outer rise normal fault and the megathrust.	2009 Samoa earthquake and tsunami
27 February 2010	03:34 (local time)	Maule Region, Chile	550	8.8	M_{w} Including 25 missing.	2010 Chile earthquake
11 March 2011	14:46 (local time)	Tohoku region, Japan	22,312	9.1	M_{w} Including 2,553 missing. One death each in Papua, Indonesia and California by tsunami.	2011 Tōhoku earthquake and tsunami
6 February 2013	12:12 (local time)	Temotu Province, Solomon Islands	16	8.0	M_{w} Including 6 missing.	2013 Solomon Islands earthquake
1 April 2014	20:46 (local time)	Iquique, Chile	11	8.2	M_{w}	2014 Iquique earthquake
16 September 2015	19:54 (local time)	Coquimbo Region, Chile	22	8.4	M_{w} Including 6 missing in Chile.	2015 Illapel earthquake
5 March 2021	08:28 (local time)	Kermadec Islands, New Zealand	0	8.1	M_{w} Was preceded by an M_{w}7.4 foreshock and unrelated M_{w}7.3 event a few hours earlier.	2021 Kermadec Islands earthquakes
28 July 2021	22:15 (local time)	Alaska, United States	0	8.2	M_{w} Was preceded by two foreshocks in 2020—M_{w}7.8 and 7.6.	2021 Chignik earthquake
12 August 2021	16:35 (local time)	(South Georgia and the South Sandwich Islands) South Sandwich Islands	0	8.1	M_{w} Complex earthquake with multiple subevents, including one that was characterized as a tsunami earthquake. Earthquake released seismic energy in the form of low-frequency seismic waves with a period of 500 seconds.	2021 South Sandwich Islands earthquakes
30 July 2025	11:16 (local time)	(Russia) Kamchatka Peninsula	1	8.8	M_{w} Was preceded by a M_{w} 7.4 foreshock 10 days prior.	2025 Kamchatka Peninsula earthquake

== See also ==
- Lists of earthquakes
- Megathrust earthquake
