= Nankai earthquakes =

Class of earthquakes in Japan

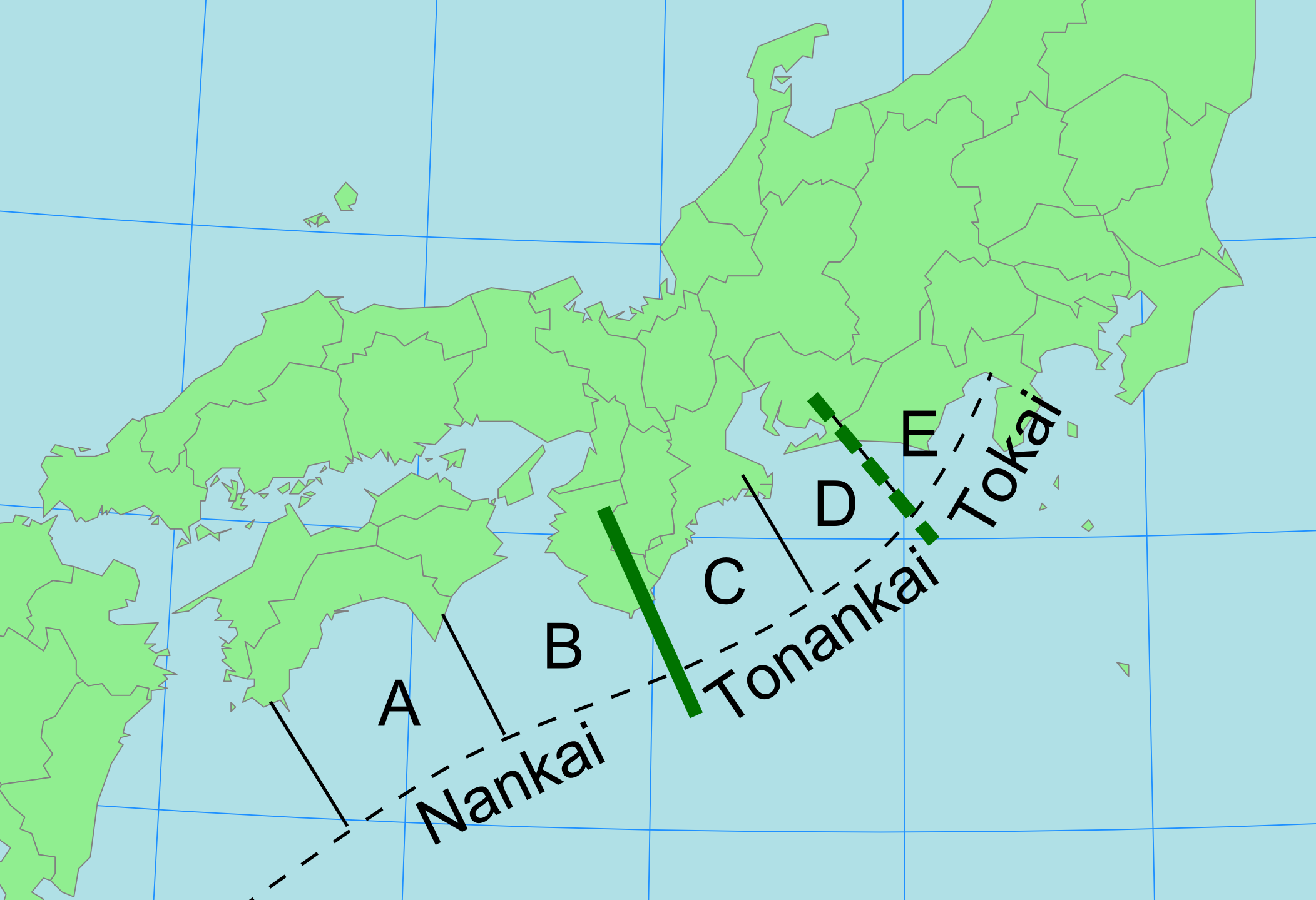
Nankai earthquakes are caused by ruptures in the west zone (A and/or B segments) of the Nankai megathrust

The Nankai earthquakes (南海地震, Nankai jishin) are major megathrust earthquakes that affect the Nankaidō (Southern Sea Circuit) region of Japan, west of the Tōnankai region (Southeastern Sea) and Tōkai region (Eastern Sea), and are caused by ruptures in the Nankai zone of the Nankai megathrust, specifically segments A and/or B. They occur with a return period of 100 to 200 years, and there is a high probability of one in the 21st century, as the most recent was the 1946 Nankaidō earthquake. These have high destructive potential, and thus are a focus of earthquake preparation.These are a class of Nankai megathrust earthquakes, frequently occurring in combination with, or following, a rupture of segments C and/or D (Tōnankai zone, yielding Tōnankai earthquakes) and sometimes segment E (Tōkai zone, yielding Tōkai earthquakes). They are also known as Nankaidō earthquakes (南海道地震, Nankaidō jishin).

== History ==
Historical Nankai earthquakes are as follows; some of these coincided with or followed earthquakes in the Tōnankai or Tōkai zones, and the 1498 Meiō Nankaidō earthquake may or may not have involved the Nankai zone:

- 684 Hakuho Nankai earthquake
- 887 Ninna Nankai earthquake
- 1099 Kōwa Nankaido earthquake
- 1361 Shōhei Nankaido earthquake
- 1605 Keichō Nankaido earthquake (also Tōnankai: A+B+C+D)
- 1707 Hōei earthquake (also Tōnankai and Tōkai: A+B+C+D+E)
- 1854 Ansei-Nankai earthquake (following 1854 Ansei-Tōkai earthquake the previous day)
- 1946 Nankaidō earthquake (following 1944 Tōnankai earthquake)

== Future risks ==
The Japanese government has estimated as of 2012 that the death toll from a future major earthquake along the Nankai zone could reach 323,000 people, down to 298,000 on March 31, 2025. As of January 2025, the Japanese Earthquake Research Committee said that there was a 80 percent likelihood that a quake with a magnitude of 8.0 to 9.0 would occur near the Nankai Trough within the next 30 years. Following the 2024 Hyūga-nada earthquake on August 8, the Japan Meteorological Agency said that the probability of a "mega earthquake" along the Nankai Trough was now "relatively higher" and raised its first advisory over the matter, but clarified that it was not imminent.
