= Tōkai earthquakes =

Class of earthquakes in Japan

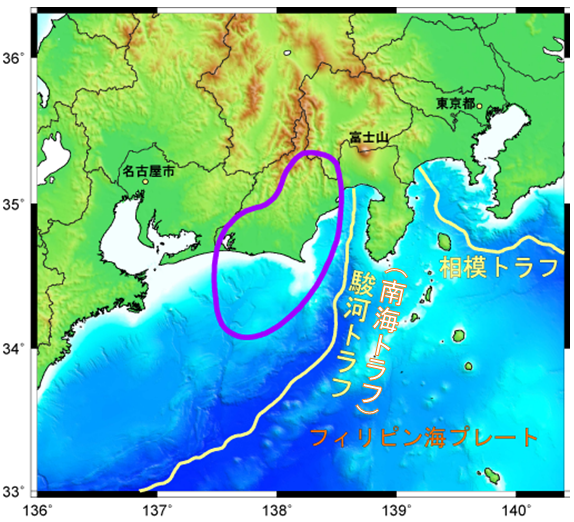
Anticipated area of the Tokai Earthquake

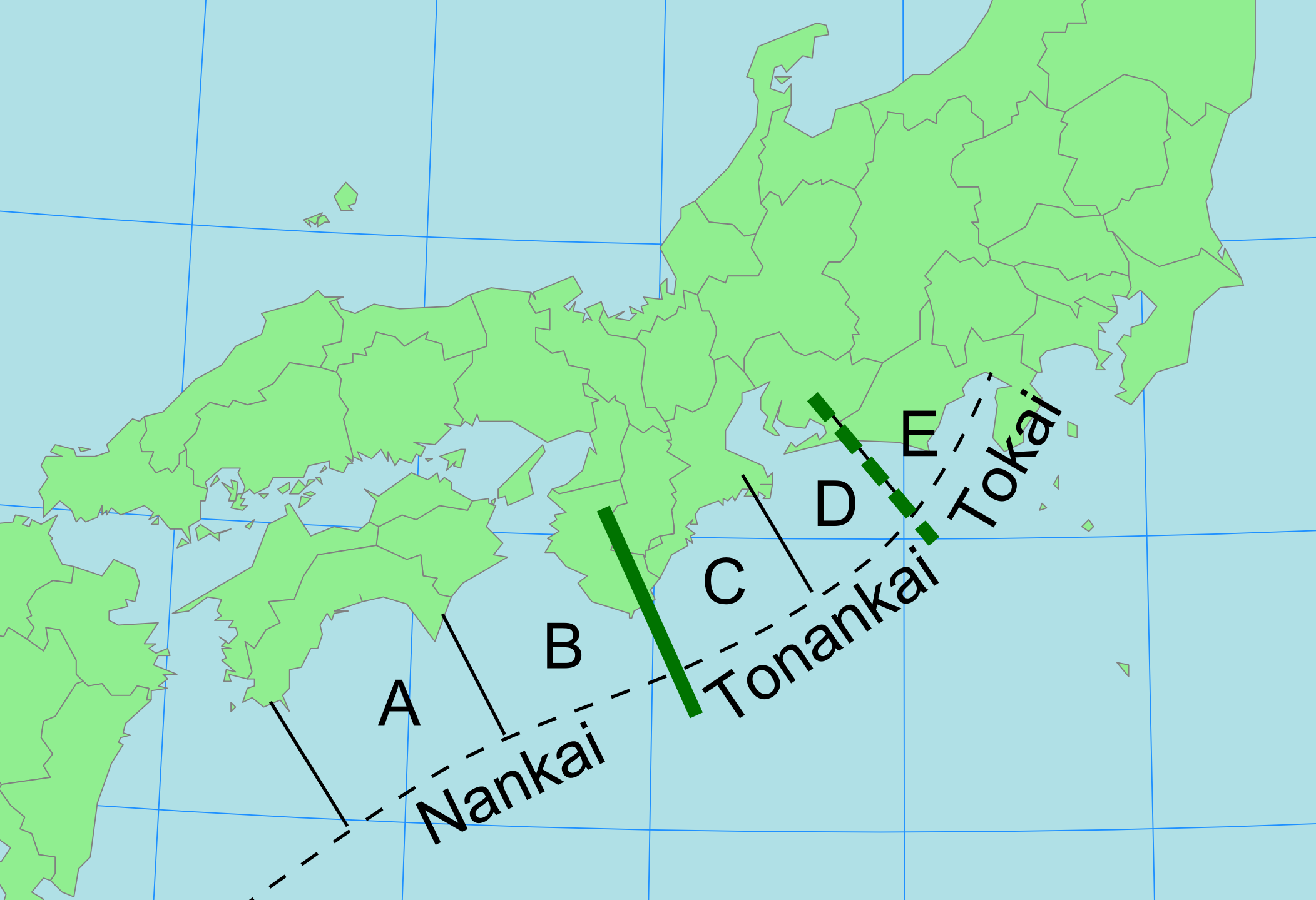
Nankai, Tōnankai and Tōkai earthquake areas

The Tōkai earthquakes (Japanese: 東海地震) are major earthquakes that have occurred regularly with a return period of 100 to 150 years in the Tōkai region of Japan. The Tōkai segment has been struck by earthquakes in 1498, 1605, 1707, and 1854. Given the historic regularity of these earthquakes, Kiyoo Mogi in 1969 pointed out that another great shallow earthquake was possible in the "near future" (i.e., in the next few decades).

Given the magnitude of the last two earthquakes, the next is expected to have at least a magnitude scale of 8.0 M_{w}, with large areas shaken at the highest level in the Japanese intensity scale, 7. Emergency planners are anticipating and preparing for potential scenarios after such an earthquake, including the possibility of thousands of deaths and hundreds of thousands of injuries, millions of damaged buildings, and cities that include Nagoya and Shizuoka devastated. Concern has been expressed over the presence of the Hamaoka Nuclear Power Plant, close to the expected epicentre of a Tōkai earthquake. The Fukushima I Nuclear Power Plant was severely damaged after a large earthquake followed by a tsunami in 2011, causing the Fukushima nuclear accident, which was a nuclear event of level 7, the highest on the scale.

Shortly after the 2011 Tōhoku earthquake, new reports were released which indicated the significant likelihood of another magnitude 9 earthquake occurring elsewhere in Japan, this time on the Nankai Trough. The reports stated that if a 9.0 earthquake occurred on the Nankai Trough, the effects would be very serious. The quake itself would likely kill thousands, and a series of 34-meter (112-foot) tall tsunamis would impact areas from the Kantō region to Kyūshū, adding thousands to the death toll, and destroying Shizuoka, Shikoku, and other areas with large populations.

== Earthquake prediction ==
The Tokai Earthquake is expected to occur in the near future along the trench near Suruga Bay with a magnitude of around 8. The Tokai region will be subjected to extremely strong shaking with seismic intensity of 6-lower or greater, and huge tsunamis are expected to hit the Pacific coast in the region.

The Japanese government is taking the Tōkai earthquakes seriously and has charged the Japan Meteorological Agency with predicting the next one. There is now a dense array of instruments placed to accumulate a continuous stream of data related to seismicity, strain, crustal expansion, tilt, tidal variations, ground water fluctuations and other variables. They are watching for an anomaly in this data which might precede the next major Tōkai earthquake.

Following the prediction of an earthquake in the relatively near future, and in order to try to predict when it would occur, the Coordinating Committee for Earthquake Prediction (CCEP) designated the Tōkai region as an Area of Specific Observation in 1970, and upgraded it to an Area of Intensified Observation in 1974. Following the passing of the Large-Scale Earthquake Countermeasure Act (大規模地震対策特別措置法) in 1978, the Earthquake Assessment Committee (EAC) was set up to warn the Prime Minister, via the Japan Meteorological Agency, if the next quake is imminent.

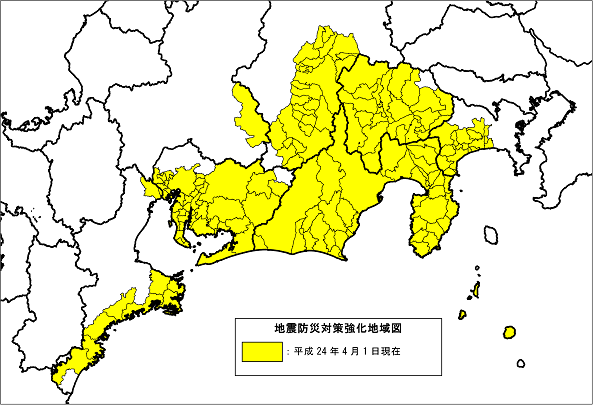
Areas under Intensified Measures against Earthquake Disaster (shown in yellow)

As serious damage from strong shaking and huge tsunamis is expected, the Japanese government has designated this region as Areas under Intensified Measures against Earthquake Disaster.

Information on future quakes is published irregularly. Since November 2017, this information limited to Tokai earthquakes has not been announced, and "Information on the Nankai megathrust earthquake (南海トラフ地震に関連する情報) " targeting the Nankai megathrust earthquakes has been in operation.

Future Tokai earthquakes are expected to occur with the sequence of

1. strain accumulation,
2. pre-slip and
3. earthquake occurrence.

JMA monitors unusual deformation that may accompany pre-slip using strainmeters to support the prediction of its occurrence. As pre-slip may be too slight to be detected by the observation systems currently in place, it is not possible to say that the Tokai Earthquake will be predicted without fail.

=== Prediction information ===
To support predictions, JMA has developed a seismic and crustal deformation observation network covering the region in conjunction with related organizations, and observes related data around-the-clock basis. After monthly assessments, or when anomalous data are detected, JMA issues Information on the Tokai Earthquake bulletins to allow emergency measures for earthquake disaster prevention. These are categorized into three types: Investigation Report on Tokai Earthquake Prediction, Tokai Earthquake Watch, and Explanatory Information on Tokai Earthquake Warning. Each report indicates the level of danger using a color code of blue, yellow and red.

Information issued by JMA	Announcement timing	Action to be taken by the general public	Action to be taken by public organizations
Explanatory Information on Tokai Earthquake Warning 東海地震予知情報	When it is considered that the Tokai Earthquake may occur and the prime minister issues a warning declaration (警戒宣言).	Response warning declaration from the prime minister and local-government disaster management plans.	Establishment of Headquarters for Earthquake Disaster Prevention
Tokai Earthquake Watch 東海地震注意情報	When there is increased likelihood that an observed phenomenon is a precursor to the Tokai Earthquake.	Response to notification from the government and local-government disaster management plans.	Preparatory action based on prevention plans
Investigation Report on Tokai Earthquake (Extra) 東海地震に関連する調査情報 (臨時)	When any anomalous phenomena are observed.	No further action required.	Collection of Information
Investigation Report on Tokai Earthquake (Regular) 東海地震に関連する調査情報 (定例)	When the Earthquake Assessment Committee (Regular) meets.	No further action required.	None

To determine whether anomalous phenomena are precursors to the Tokai Earthquake, JMA convenes the Earthquake Assessment Committee for Areas under Intensified Measures against Earthquake Disaster (地震防災対策強化地域判定会), which consists of seismologists and members of governmental organizations. If the Committee concludes that the Tokai Earthquake is imminent, the Director-General of JMA will report this conclusion to the Prime Minister, who will then hold a Cabinet meeting and issue a warning statement (警戒宣言).

== Relation to other major earthquakes ==
The pattern of historical seismicity reveals that the megathrust surface is segmented, with five separate zones of rupturing identified, conventionally labeled A–E, from west to east. Earthquakes involving the A+B segments are generally referred to as Nankai (literally South Sea) earthquakes, C+D Tōnankai (literally Southeast Sea) earthquakes and E Tōkai (literally East Sea) earthquakes. These earthquakes repeat at intervals generally in the range of 90 – 200 years.

On all but one occasion, rupture of segment C (±D ±E) has been followed by rupture of segments A+B within a few years. This behavior has been reproduced by modeling the viscoelastic response of the megathrust fault plane with lateral variations in both convergence rate and frictional properties.

== Historical Tōkai earthquakes ==
Date	Magnitude	Name	Death toll	Description	Years since previous earthquake
November 26, 684	8.3	Hakuhō earthquake	unknown	Landslides. Many houses, shrines and temples collapsed.	No records
August 22, 887	8.5	Ninna earthquake	unknown	Many people were killed by collapsing houses.	203
December 11, 1096	8.4	Kōwa earthquake	unknown	The main building of the imperial palace was damaged, and the big bell of the Tōdai-ji temple fell down. The tsunami in Suruga split houses, and 400 shrines and temples were damaged.	209
July 26, 1361	8.5	Shohei earthquake	unknown	Considerable damage.	265
September 11, 1498	8.4	Meiō earthquake	40,000	Kai was severely shaken. The buildings around the great Buddha of Kamakura (altitude 7m) were swept away by a tsunami. In Ōminato, Ise 1,000 households were destroyed with 5,000 people drowned. 10,000 people drowned in Ise-Shima, while in Shida District, Shizuoka Prefecture, 26,000 people died. Nankai earthquakes also occurred around the same time, according to the Geological Survey of Japan.	137
February 3, 1605	7.9	1605 Keichō Nankaidō earthquake	2,300	The tsunami struck from the Pacific coast of Kyushu, Miyazaki, led to the deaths of 57 on the island Hachijō-jima, destroyed 700 houses in a village west of the Kii Peninsula, 1,500 people died in Shishikui Awa, 350 deaths in Tosa Nishinoura, and 400 in the vicinity of Cape Muroto.	107
October 28, 1707	8.4	Hoei earthquake	20,000	Tōkai, Tōnankai and Nankai earthquakes occurred at the same time with magnitude 8.4–8.6. Mount Fuji erupted 49 days after this earthquake and the Hōei crater was created. About 20,000 people were killed and 60,000 houses collapsed, the Tosa area was affected by the tsunami.	102
December 23, 1854	8.4	Ansei-Tōkai earthquake	3,000	The epicenter ranged from Suruga Bay to the deep ocean, and struck primarily in the Tōkai region, but destroyed houses as far away as Edo. The accompanying tsunami caused damage along the entire coast from the Bōsō Peninsula in modern-day Chiba prefecture to Tosa province (modern-day Kōchi Prefecture).	147

== See also ==
- 1944 Tōnankai earthquake
- Coordinating Committee for Earthquake Prediction
- Kanto earthquakes
- List of earthquakes in Japan
- Nankai megathrust earthquakes
