= Tōnankai earthquakes =

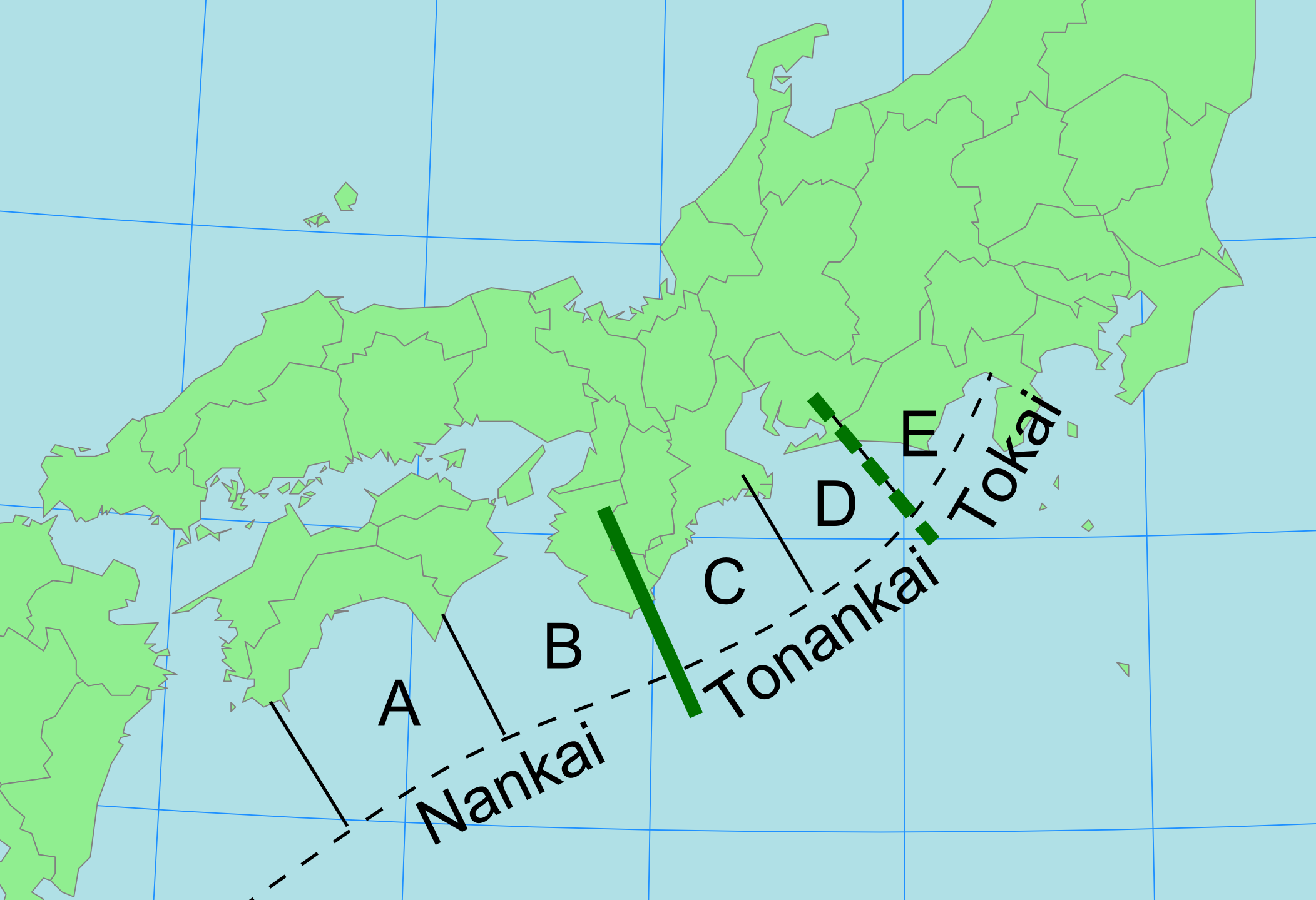
Tōnankai earthquakes are caused by ruptures in the middle zone (C and/or D segments) of the Nankai megathrust

The Tōnankai earthquakes are major megathrust earthquakes that affect the Tōnankai region (Southeastern Sea) of Japan, between the Tōkai region (Eastern Sea) and Nankaidō (Southern Sea Circuit) region, and are caused by ruptures in the Tōnankai zone of the Nankai megathrust, specifically segments C and/or D.

These are a class of Nankai megathrust earthquakes, frequently occurring in combination with a rupture of segment E (Tōkai zone, yielding Tōkai earthquakes), and either in combination with or followed by a rupture of segment A and/or B (Nankai zone, yielding Nankai earthquakes).

The most notable Tōnankai earthquake, and the only earthquake known to have consisted of ruptures in the Tōnankai zone only, is the 1944 Tōnankai earthquake.

== History ==
The distinction of Tōnankai earthquakes, and the Tōnankai region itself, is a recent one, dating to the 1944 Tōnankai earthquake. Nankai (Southern Sea) and Nankaidō (Southern Sea Way), and likewise Tōkai (Eastern Sea) and Tōkaidō (Eastern Sea Way) are historical names and divisions of Japan, but following the 1944 earthquake, it was recognized that there were distinct segments in between these, which could independently rupture, and thus a different category was created.
