= Nankai megathrust earthquakes =

Class of earthquakes in Japan

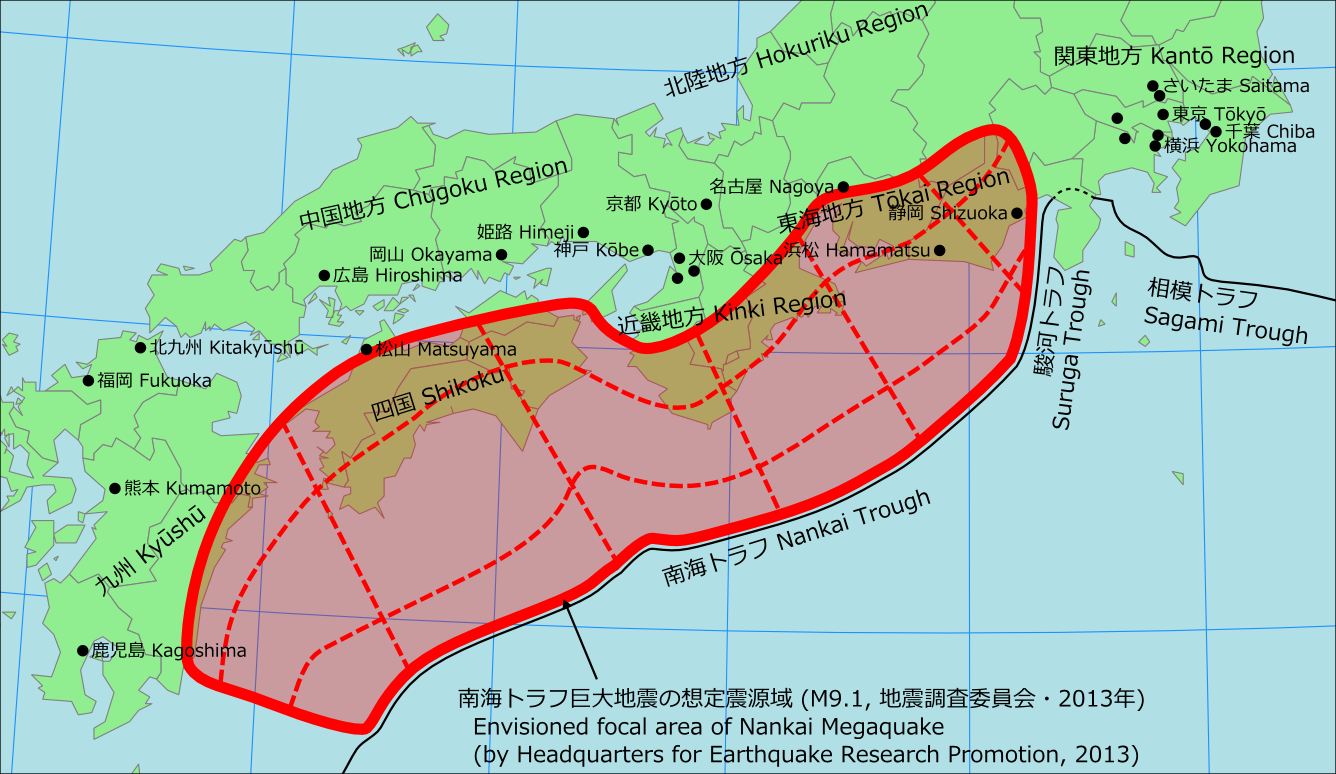
Envisioned focal area of M9.1 Nankai Trough Megathrust Earthquake, by Headquarters for Earthquake Research Promotion, 2013.

Nankai megathrust earthquakes (Japanese: 南海トラフ巨大地震, Hepburn: Nankai Torafu Kyodai Jishin) are great megathrust earthquakes that occur along the Nankai megathrust – the fault under the Nankai Trough – which forms the plate interface between the subducting Philippine Sea plate and the overriding Amurian Plate (part of the Eurasian plate), which dips beneath southwestern Honshu, Japan. The fault is divided into five segments in three zones, which rupture separately or in combination, and depending on location, the resulting earthquakes are subdivided by zone from west to east into Nankai earthquakes, Tōnankai earthquakes, and Tōkai earthquakes.

The earthquakes occur with a return period of about 90–200 years, and often occur in pairs, where a rupture along one part of the fault is followed by a rupture elsewhere on the fault, notably the 1854 Ansei-Tōkai earthquake and the 1854 Ansei-Nankai earthquake the next day, and the 1944 Tōnankai earthquake, followed by the 1946 Nankaidō earthquake. In one recorded case (the 1707 Hōei earthquake) the fault ruptured along its entire length. All of these great earthquakes have resulted in damaging tsunamis, which are particularly damaging due to the Japanese population being concentrated on the Taiheiyō Belt, especially the coastal cities of Tokyo, Yokohama and Osaka, the three most populous cities in Japan. The area remains seismically active, and future earthquakes are anticipated, with a high risk of a Nankai earthquake in the near future, which could be potentially very damaging.

== Tectonic setting ==
The Nankai Trough is the surface expression of the subduction zone between the Philippine Sea and Amur plates. Honshu itself is formed from the island arc developed over the subducting plate. The megathrust boundary extends about 700 km from the southern end of Kyūshū to the triple junction with the Okhotsk microplate near Mount Fuji. At its southwestern end, there is another triple junction, where the overriding plate becomes the Okinawa plate.

== Megathrust geometry ==
The megathrust dip increases from about 5° near the surface to 10° as it passes beneath the coast of Honshu. Analysis of seismic reflection data suggests that some of the displacement is carried by a splay fault dipping at about 25°. This 'megasplay' fault system has caused an unusually thick section of fluid-rich sedimentary rocks to be deeply underthrust. The presence of this 'weak' zone may lead to shallow coseismic rupture along the megasplay faults during megathrust earthquakes, explaining the large tsunamis created by these events.

== Historical seismicity ==
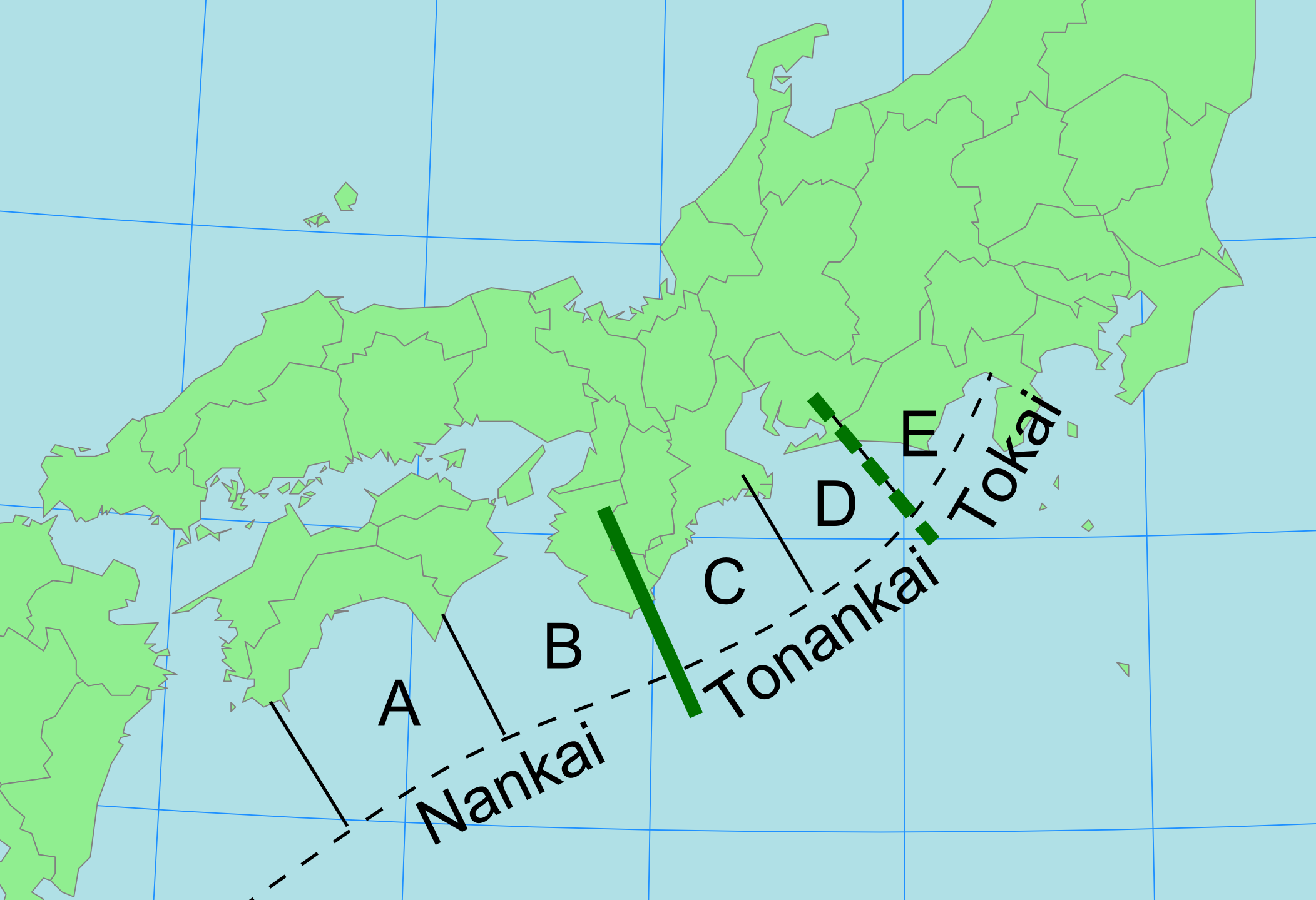
Rupture areas on the Nankai trough megathrust showing names of earthquakes equating to each area

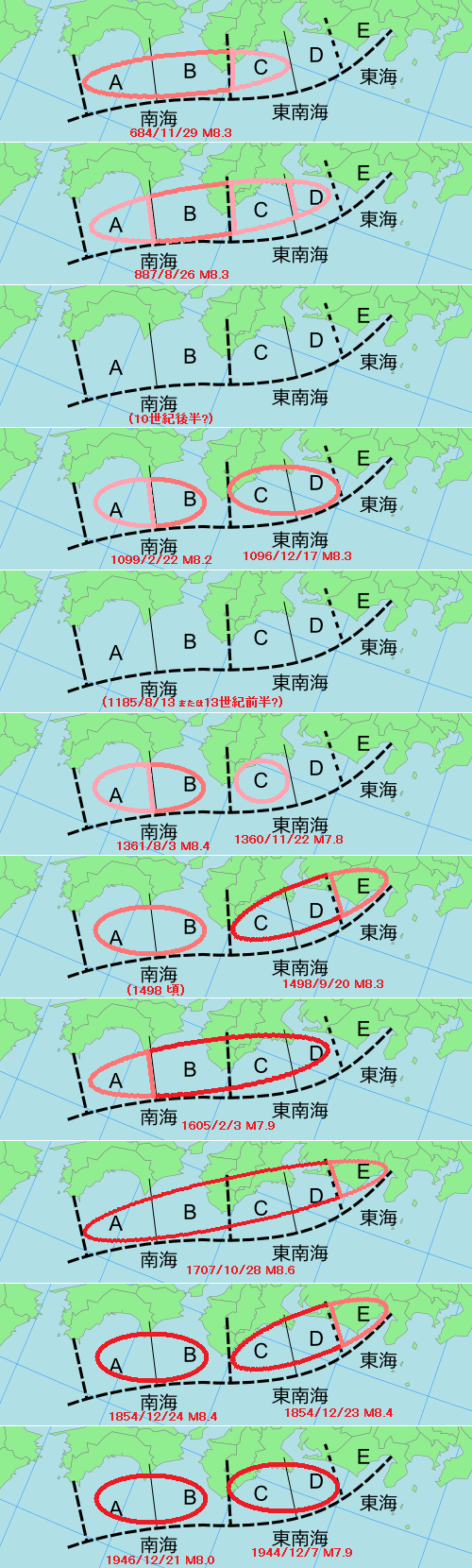
Rupture areas in historical order, showing pairs

The Nankai megathrust is thought to have caused at least 12 major earthquakes in the last ca. 1300 years. The pattern of historical seismicity reveals that the megathrust surface is segmented, with five separate zones of rupturing identified, conventionally labelled A–E, from west to east. Earthquakes involving the A+B segments are generally referred to as Nankai (literally South Sea) earthquakes, C+D Tonankai (literally Southeast Sea) earthquakes and C+D+E Tokai (literally East Sea) earthquakes. The earthquake repeat intervals are generally in the range 90–200 years.

On all but one occasion, rupture of segment C (±D ±E) has been followed by rupture of segments A+B within a few years. This behaviour has been reproduced by modelling the viscoelastic response of the megathrust fault plane with lateral variations in both convergence rate and frictional properties.

== Future earthquake risk ==
The northeasternmost part of the megathrust, segment E, has not ruptured since 1854. A future large earthquake involving a rupture along this and possibly other segments has been proposed as a major risk for the southern coast of Honshu. In 1999, the likelihood of the occurrence of a great earthquake in the Tokai area in the 2000–2010 period was estimated to be in the range of 0.35–0.45. Despite the uncertainty of when such an earthquake will occur, local authorities are already taking action to prepare residents for what they regard as an inevitability.

Following the Hyūga-nada earthquake in August 2024, the Japan Meteorological Agency (JMA) warned that the risks of a megathrust earthquake on the Nankai Trough is "relatively higher than usual", and issued a "caution" warning for the first time in Japanese history. Meanwhile, the agency also stressed that such earthquake was not imminent, though the probability was higher than usual.

=== Potential effects ===
The Japanese government estimates that a major earthquake on the Nankai Trough would cause ¥169.5 trillion (US$1.54 trillion) in direct damage and ¥50.8 trillion (US$463 billion) in economic losses for the following year. A study by the Japan Society of Civil Engineers in 2018 estimated that the long-term damage from the earthquake could result in ¥1.24 trillion (US$7.894 billion) in economic losses over a 20-year period. It is predicted that the economic damage is likely to be 10 times higher than for the 2011 Tōhoku earthquake and tsunami. The government estimated a worst-case scenario death toll as high as 323,000 in 2012. A later estimate from 2019 revised these figures down to 231,000 deaths and ¥213.7 trillion (US$1.501 trillion) in economic damage, due to improved earthquake resistance.

== List of occurrences ==
All the dates shown in the table use the Gregorian calendar. Some sources use the Julian calendar for the earlier earthquakes in the list.

#	Date/Time‡	Name	Mag.	Ruptured segments	Tsunami max. wave height (m)	Coordinates	Fatalities	Sources
1	684-11-29 22:00	684 Hakuho earthquake	8.4	A+B +?(C+D+E)	3.0	32.8°N 134.3°E	many	
2	887-8-26 16:00	Ninna Nankai earthquake	8.6	A+B +?(C+D+E)	10.0	33.0°N 135.0°E	many	
3	1096-12-17 08:00	1096 Eicho earthquake	8.4	C +?(D+E)	7.0	34.0°N 137.5°E		
4	1099-2-22 06:00	Kōwa Nankaido earthquake	8.0	A+B		33.0°N 135.5°E		
5	1360-11-22	Uncertain event	7.0		6.0	33.4°N 136.2°E		
6	1361-8-03 04:00	1361 Shōhei earthquake	8.4	A+B +?(C+D)		33.0°N 135.0°E		
7	1498-9-20 08:00	1498 Meiō Nankaidō earthquake	8.6	?(A+B) C+D +?E		34.0°N 138.0°E	thousands	
8	1605-2-3 20:00	1605 Keichō Nankaido earthquake	7.9	A+B+C+D	10.0	33.0°N 135.0°E	thousands	
9	1707-10-28 14:00	1707 Hōei earthquake	8.6	A+B+C+D+E	25.7	33.0°N 136.0°E	5,000	
10	1854-12-23 09:00	1854 Tōkai earthquake	8.4	C+D+E	21.0	34.0°N 137.8°E	2,000	
11	1854-12-24 16:00	1854 Nankai earthquake	8.4	A+B	28.0	33.0°N 135.0°E	thousands	
12	1944-12-7 13:35	1944 Tōnankai earthquake	8.1	C+D	10.0	33.57°N 136.18°E	1,251	
13	1946-12-21 04:19	1946 Nankaidō earthquake	8.1	A+B	6.6	32.93°N 135.85°E	1,330	

== See also ==
- List of earthquakes in Japan
