= 1096 Eichō earthquake =

Earthquake and tsunami in Japan

- Location within Japan
- Local date: 17 December 1096
- Magnitude: M_{w} 8.0–8.5
- Epicenter: 39.50°N 140.40°E
- Areas affected: Japan
- Tsunami: 7 m (23 ft)

The 1096 Eicho earthquake affected the coast of Japan on 17 December during the Heian period. It is postulated by geologists to be a large megathrust earthquake along the Nankai subduction zone off southern Honshu with a magnitude between 8.0 and 8.5. The earthquake also generated a destructive tsunami with a maximum height of 7 m (23 ft).

== Tectonic setting ==
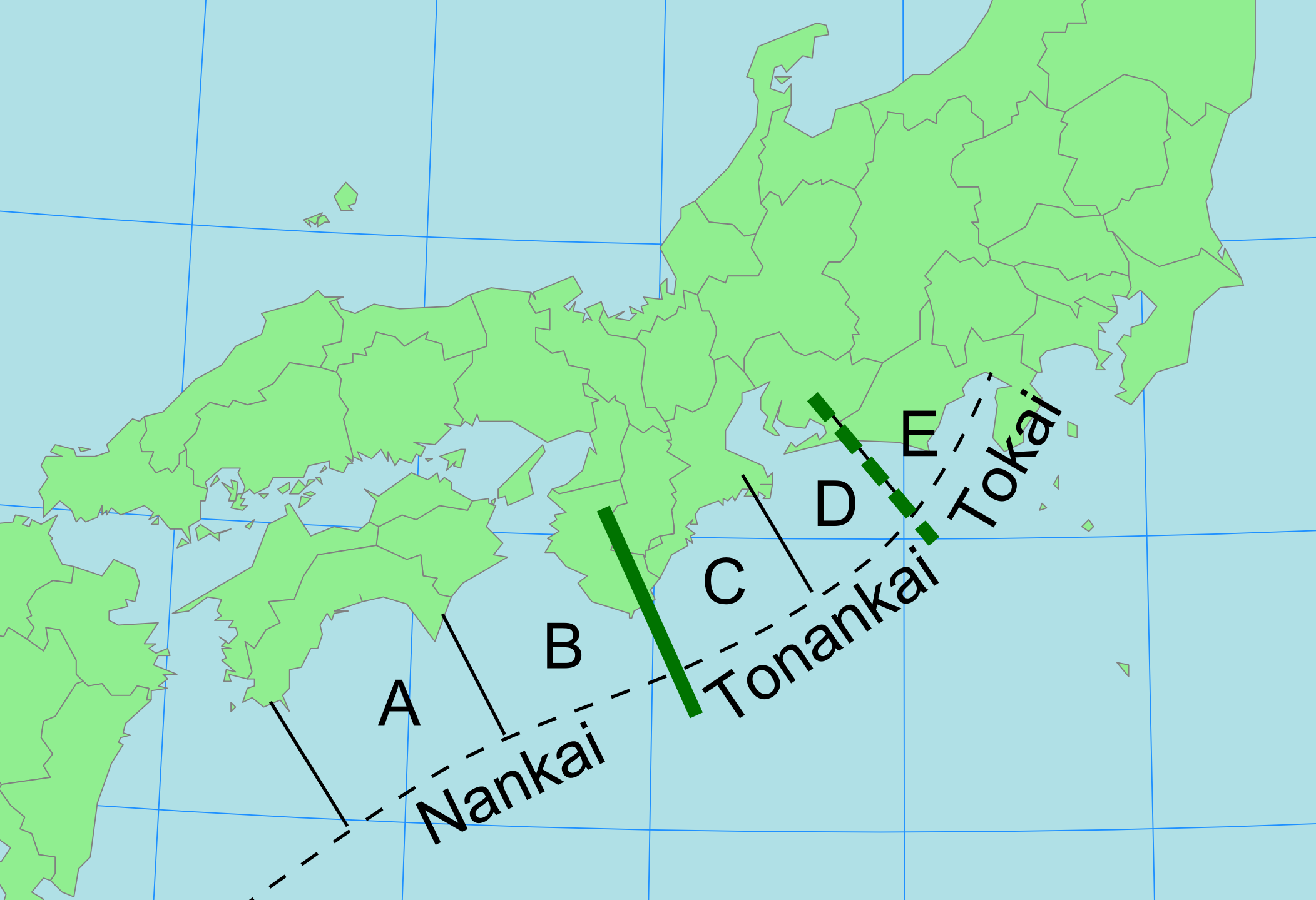
Segments of the Nankai subduction zone with segment Z omitted

The Nankai Trough delineates a subduction zone along the southwestern coast of Honshu where the Philippine Sea plate subducts northwestward beneath the Amurian plate. This fault zone has been the source of several large megathrust earthquakes in historic times with moment magnitudes of 8.0 or greater. The Nankai megathrust can be divided into three segments from east to west; Nankai, Tonankai and Tokai. These are further segmented into regions A and B for the Nankai segment; C and D for the Nankai segment; and E for the Tokai segment. Another segment west of the Nankai segment is known as Hyuganada (region Z). Scientists have identified patterns in the historic ruptures on the Nankai Trough; the Nankai segment may rupture with the Tokai or Tonankai segments or these segments may rupture in one earthquake. Another pattern involves the Nankai segment rupture separated by up to three years before the Tokai or Tonankai segments ruptures. The return period for M_{w} 8.5 earthquakes on the Nankai Trough is estimated at 400 to 600 years with the last example in 1707. The 1707 earthquake is the only event to have ruptured all segments of the Nankai Trough though there is uncertainty over whether the Tokai segment ruptured.

== Earthquake ==
Seismologist Hiroshi Kawasum provided the first estimate of the earthquake's magnitude at 7.0 on the energy class magnitude scale M_{(K)}. Tatsuo Usami placed the moment magnitude at 8.0 to 8.5 while Tokuji Utsu and others placed the magnitude at 8.3. Based on the observation of strong ground motion in the Kinai, Lake Biwa, and Ibi River areas, and a destructive tsunami in Tsu and Suruga, regions C and D of the Nankai subduction zone (in the Enshū and Kumano seas) were likely the location of the rupture. Additionally, the rupture may have extended beneath Suruga Bay involving region E.

== Impact ==
Japanese court noble Munetada Fujiwara documented the earthquake's damage to several temples in his journal titled Chūyūki. Fujiwara wrote of a large bell at the Tōdai-ji which fell while a corridor of the Yakushi-ji collapsed. At the Hōjō-ji, a sōrin toppled, and two pagodas of the Hosshō-ji were damaged. The document also recorded serious damage in Kyoto including a collapse of the Seta Bridge. At present-day Tsu in Mie Prefecture, many homes were destroyed by a tsunami. Fujiwara no Moromichi said that more than 400 shrines, temples, and houses were swept away by the tsunami in Suruga Province.

== See also ==
- List of earthquakes in Japan
