= 679 Tsukushi earthquake =

Earthquake in Kyushu, Japan

- Magnitude: 6.5~7.5 M_{w}
- Epicenter: Northern Kyushu
- Areas affected: Kyushu, Japan

The 679 Tsukushi earthquake was a major earthquake that occurred in northern Kyushu during the late Asuka period (Hakuho period). It is described in the Nihon Shoki and is the oldest historical earthquake in Japan whose epicenter is roughly known.

In the Nihon Shoki, descriptions of earthquakes frequently appear around the time of the earthquake. Approximately six years after this earthquake, a massive earthquake along the Nankai Trough, occurred.

== Earthquake records ==
During the 7th year of Emperor Tenmu's reign, between December (Julian calendar: 18 January – 15 February 679; Gregorian calendar: 21 January – 18 February 679), a major earthquake occurred, centered in the Tsukushi Province. The exact date of the earthquake is unknown.

A ground fissure 6 metres (20 ft) wide and over 10 kilometres (6.2 mi) long was formed, destroying several homes in the villages. Hills also collapsed, and houses on top of them moved without being destroyed, while the residents did not notice the collapse of the hills and were shocked to discover it the next morning.
