= Nankai Trough gas hydrate site =

Natural gas field in Japan

Nankai Methane Hydrate Site (or Japanese Methane Hydrate R&D Program at Nankai, Nankai Trough Methane Hydrate Site) is located in the Nankai Trough, Japan.

== Introduction to the area ==
The Nankai Trough is located beneath the Pacific Ocean off the southeast coast of Japan, and extends more than 700 km in a southwest-northward trending direction. The Nankai Trough is not only known as an active subduction and earthquake zone, but also for its large clathrate hydrate deposits occurring on the shelf and continental slope. Due to the combination of Japan’s lack of domestic fossil energy sources, along with a projected continued rise in energy consumption, the methane hydrate occurrences in Nankai Trough sedimentary sequences are increasingly the focus of energy resource studies. These resources have the potential to secure a supply of domestic natural gas to meet Japan’s needs for decades to come.

The Nankai Trough drilling site is of major interest, as recent research in the area has offered groundbreaking new insights concerning the occurrence of methane hydrate deposits in a marine environment.

Additionally, research at Nankai Trough is expected to promote the technical development necessary for the commercial exploration and production of methane gas from hydrates, and to facilitate its use and contribution to a long-term national energy strategy.

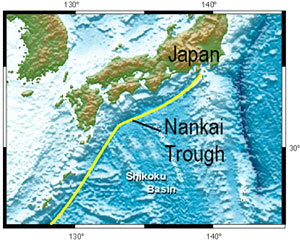
Location map of the Nankai Trough along the southeastern coast of Japan

== General physical and geological description ==
The Nankai Trough area was identified by the United States Department of Energy (DOE) and its United States Department of Energy National Laboratories (NETL) as an important hydrate-bearing region in the Asian-Pacific. DOE gas hydrate resource estimates indicate a hydrate potential of 16 to 27 trillion cubic meters. Research has confirmed the presence of gas hydrates in two different locations within the Nankai Trough: the hydrates can be found in the accretionary prism off Shikoku and Tokai, and also in the back-arc basin system northwest of Japan. Nearly all of the natural gas hydrate accumulations identified in the Nankai Trough region occur at a depth of around 290 to 300 meters below the seafloor (1,240 meters below sea-level). The structure of the Nankai Trough is dominated by the development of this accretionary prism since the Miocene, which formed due to the northwestward trending subduction of the Philippine Sea plate beneath the Eurasian Plate. The active subduction zone makes the Trough one of the most active earthquake zones on the planet. The subsiding segment of the Philippine Plate is the so-called ‘Shikoku basin’, which defines a former forearc basin that was subsequently filled with sediments from submarine fan systems in the area, although most of the accreted sediments consist of coarse terrestrial clastics.

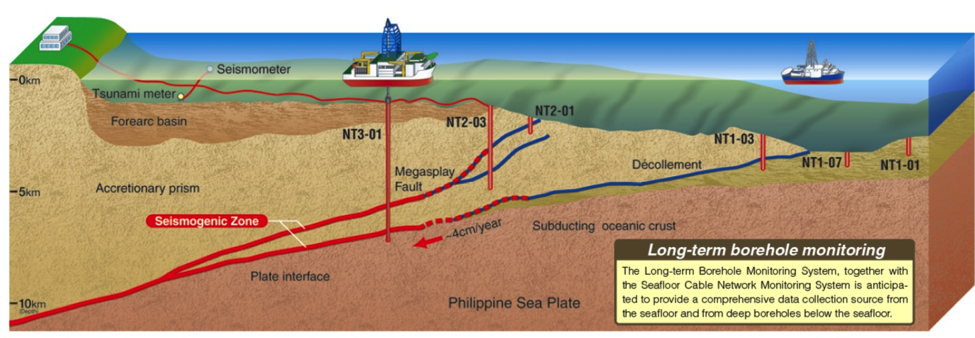
The Nankai Trough Fault Line with its seismogenic active zone

In Arctic regions, natural gas hydrate deposits mostly occur in sand-rich units in association with permafrost. In contrast, gas hydrates in a marine environment tend to occur in continental margin sediments consisting primarily of fine-grained clay minerals and organic debris, which has settled onto the seafloor. They appear to be a very common constituent, filling spaces between the grains and within cracks and fissures in sediments on deepwater continental shelves where the temperature and pressure conditions are suitable for gas hydrate formation. It is generally believed that the majority of natural gas hydrate deposits around the world exist in fine-grained sediments in a dispersed and low-concentrated form, with hydrate saturations of between 1 and 12%. The low hydrate saturation can be explained due to the very small pore size and low permeability in clay-rich sediments, which hinder the mobility of both water and gas, necessary for hydrate formation (see UNEP Global Outlook on Methane Gas Hydrates (2012, in progress) for more details). In contrast, Japanese scientists were able to discover thick sequences of interbedded sands and muds while drilling on the southeastern coast on the margin of the Nankai Trough. Natural gas hydrates seem to mostly occur in high concentrations in the sand units, representing up to 70% of the pore space and are largely absent from the mud sequences.

== The Japanese Methane Gas Hydrate R&D Program at Nankai Trough ==
The Japanese drilling project, part of the “Methane Hydrate Research and Development (R&D) Program”, is located in the Nankai Trough region along the southeastern margin of Japan. The production research well project was developed in this region after field surveys completed by the Japanese government in 1995 revealed the existence of a bottom simulating reflector (BSR), which is believed to indicate the existence of large subsurface gas hydrate deposits. The project aims were to understand the nature of methane hydrate-bearing sediments in the Nankai Trough, the gas hydrates’ role as a future potential energy resource, and to assess the production and properties of the gas hydrate and its stability. In order to produce methane from gas hydrates, the development of safe and dependable technology is very much needed, as dissociation of methane in shallow waters can produce very high pressures and cause submarine landslides. Furthermore, the scientific study aimed to develop new safety techniques guarding against any hazardous conditions created by gas hydrate drilling and pipeline construction and give insights into drilling and production technology with regard to a new industrial development.

In late 1999 and early 2000, the Japan Ministry of Economy, Trade and Industry (METI, formerly known as the Japan Ministry of International Trade and Industry, MITI) commissioned six exploration wells that were successfully drilled at a water depth of 945 meters in the eastern Nankai Trough region, 50 km off the coast near Tokyo Bay, to characterize the natural gas hydrate deposits and investigate their overall commercial potential. Two wells were drilled in order to develop an appropriate casing program. The third well was drilled to 3,000 meters below sea-level in order to analyze the composition of the different strata and assess the contained gas. Seismic data showed a well-defined bottom simulating reflector, marking the bottom of the gas hydrate stability zone, found in a depth of 290 meters below the seafloor (1,240 meters below sea-level). Cores were taken in a depth between 1,152 and 1,210 meters, revealing the presence of gas hydrates in three different zones, with the hydrates accounting for 20% of the bulk volume and 80% of the pore space. These three different zones mostly consist of heterogeneous turbiditic sandstones that show permeabilities between 30 and 40% and are either continuous or discontinuous. The gas trapped inside the clathrates is predominantly biogenic and hints to a progressive decrease in microbial activity with depth and an additional upward migration throughout the sediment column. Based on these exploration results, the Japanese government initiated the 16-year methane hydrate R&D research program in 2001.

Leading project partners included the Japan National Oil Corporation (formerly known as JNOC, now Japan Oil, Gas and Metals National Corporation – JOGMEC), the Japanese Petroleum Exploration (JAPEX), the United States Department of Energy (DOE) as well as other industry partners. Together with the Japanese Ministry of Economy, Trade and Industry (MITI) they form a consortium named ‘MH21 – The Research Consortium for Methane Hydrate Resources in Japan’, whose overall aim it is to establish a process for commercial production from offshore gas hydrates by the year 2018.

In addition to the national R&D research program, there have been cruise expeditions carried out at drill observation wells in the Nankai Trough region by the Integrated Ocean Drilling Program (IODP) and its forerunner, the Ocean Drilling Program (ODP), to analyze the geochemical composition of the gas and to collect geological and geophysical data on the reservoir units. In 2010 and 2011, extensive research was completed on seven expeditions (314, 315, 316: first stage; 319 and 322: second stage; 326, 332 and 333: third stage) in order to complete three Nankai Trough Seismogenic Zone Experiments (NanTroSEIZE), which are expected to give groundbreaking new insights on the seismology and geophysical conditions of the area. NanTroSeize aims to drill, sample, and instrument the earthquake causing, seismogenic active portion of Earth’s crust, where large-scale earthquakes have occurred repeatedly throughout history, also influencing the gas hydrate deposits.

== The importance of Nankai Trough as an active study site ==
The Nankai Trough, as a continuous gas hydrate research site for over more than a decade, is the first fully integrated field study and modern production test well project for offshore natural gas hydrates in the northwest Pacific Ocean. Six wells were successfully drilled to test natural gas hydrate accumulations off the southeastern coast of Japan, and to explore a conventional Tertiary structure. It gave scientists the opportunity to monitor the physical response of gas hydrate deposits and investigate marine gas hydrates in one of the most active earthquake zones on the planet.

Research within the Nankai Trough is expected to give helpful insights into the formation and occurrence of natural gas hydrates off the Japanese coast, for although the Nankai Trough exploration wells revealed the existence of pore-filling gas hydrates in turbiditic sand units, it is still unclear how much hydrate potential the area has to offer with respect to exact volumes and economic viability of the occurrences and their relationship to BSR distribution.
