= Tokuji Utsu =

Japanese seismologist

Tokuji Utsu (Japanese: 宇津 徳治, April 13, 1928 – August 18, 2004) was a Japanese seismologist and Professor Emeritus of University of Tokyo. He graduated from the Faculty of Science at the University of Tokyo in 1951 and became a professor at the Earthquake Research Institute, University of Tokyo in 1977. Utsu was compiling "Catalog of Damaging Earthquakes in the World". He received the Medal with Purple Ribbon, the Order of the Sacred Treasure, 2nd class and so on.

== Books ==
- 宇津徳治 『地震学』 共立出版〈共立全書〉(1977)
- 宇津徳治 『地震学 第2版』 共立出版〈共立全書〉(1984) ISBN 4-320-00216-4
- 宇津徳治ほか編 『地震の事典』 朝倉書店 (1987) ISBN 4-254-16016-X
- 宇津徳治 『世界の被害地震の表 - 暫定版』 Earthquake Research Institute, University of Tokyo (1989)
- 宇津徳治 『日本付近のM6.0以上の地震および被害地震の震度分布図 - 1901年～1926年』Earthquake Research Institute, University of Tokyo (1989年)
- 宇津徳治 『地震活動総説』 東京大学出版会 (1999) ISBN 4-13-060728-6
- 宇津徳治 『地震学 第3版』 共立出版 (2001) ISBN 4-320-04637-4
- 宇津徳治ほか編 『地震の事典 第2版』 朝倉書店 (2001) ISBN 4-254-16039-9
