= 1605 Keichō earthquake =

Earthquake in Japan

- Location within Japan
- Local date: 3 February 1605
- Local time: 20:00
- Magnitude: 7.9 M_{s}
- Epicenter: 33.5°N 138.5°E
- Fault: Nankai megathrust
- Areas affected: Japan: Chūbu region, Kansai region, Shikoku, Kyushu
- Tsunami: Yes
- Casualties: Thousands

The 1605 Keichō earthquake (Japanese: 慶長地震) occurred at about 20:00 local time on 3 February. It had an estimated magnitude of 7.9 on the surface-wave magnitude scale and triggered a devastating tsunami that resulted in thousands of deaths in the Nankai and Tōkai regions of Japan. It is uncertain whether there were two separate earthquakes separated by a short time interval or a single event. It is referred to as a tsunami earthquake, in that the size of the tsunami greatly exceeds that expected from the magnitude of the earthquake.

== Background ==
The southern coast of Honshu runs parallel to the Nankai Trough, which marks the subduction of the Philippine Sea plate beneath the Eurasian plate. Movement on this convergent plate boundary leads to many earthquakes, some of them of megathrust type. The Nankai megathrust has five distinct segments (A-E) that can rupture independently, the segments have ruptured either singly or together repeatedly over the last 1,300 years. Megathrust earthquakes on this structure tend to occur in pairs, with a relatively short time gap between them although in the 1707 Hōei earthquake all segments are thought to have ruptured at once. In 1854 there were two earthquakes a day apart and there were similar earthquakes in 1944 and 1946. In each case, the northeastern segment ruptured before the southwestern segment. In the 1605 event, there is evidence for two distinct earthquakes, but they are not distinguished by all historical sources and some seismologists suggest that only the Nankai segment of the megathrust ruptured.

== Earthquake ==
There are very few reports of shaking associated with this earthquake, with most historical records only mentioning the tsunami. This has led seismologists to interpret this as a 'tsunami earthquake', probably involving a slow rupture velocity causing little observed shaking while generating a large tsunami.

== Tsunami ==
The records of this tsunami are quite sparse but the maximum wave heights are larger than those recorded for either the 1707 Hōei or 1854 Ansei Nankai tsunamis in areas on the south coast of Shikoku where they can be compared. The regional extent of this tsunami is supported by the discovery of tsunami deposits on the northeastern part of the Kii Peninsula and at Lake Hamana correlated to this event. Victims of the tsunami were also reported from Kyushu.

== Damage ==
There is no reported damage associated with the earthquake itself. At least 700 houses were washed away at Hiro in present-day Wakayama prefecture and 80 at Arai in what is now Shizuoka prefecture. Castles were reported destroyed or damaged at Tahara on the Atsumi Peninsula; the main keep of Kakegawa Castle was also destroyed. The total number of casualties is uncertain as records are incomplete and contradictory, but estimates are in the order of thousands.

== See also ==
- List of earthquakes in Japan
- List of historical earthquakes
