= Pre-slip =

Seismology Term

In seismology, pre-slip is a phenomenon in which part of a hard bonded region underground detaches and begins to slip by slow. It often occurs before a major earthquake occurs at the plate boundary.

== See also ==
- Slow earthquake
