= 1707 Hōei earthquake =

Earthquake and tsunami off the southern coast of Japan

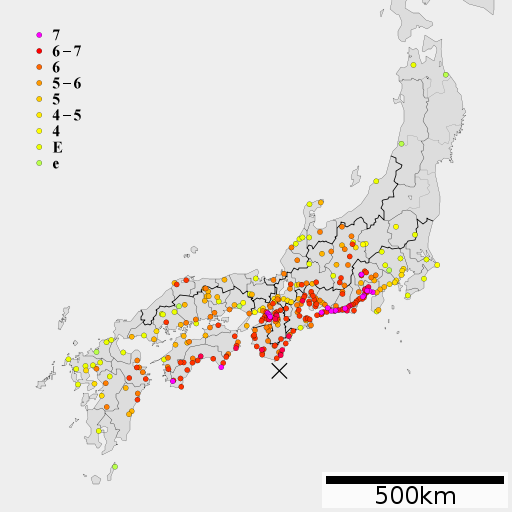
- Hōei earthquake intensity map in JMA scale.

- Location within Japan
- Local date: 28 October 1707
- Local time: around 13:45 JST
- Magnitude: M_{L} 8.6; M_{w} 8.7
- Epicenter: 33.2°N 135.9°E
- Fault: Nankai megathrust
- Areas affected: Japan: Chūbu region, Kansai region, Shikoku, Kyūshū
- Max. intensity: JMA 7
- Tsunami: 25.7 m (84 ft)
- Casualties: 4,900–21,000

The 1707 Hōei earthquake (宝永地震, Hōei jishin) struck south-central Japan at around 13:45 local time on 28 October 1707. It was the largest earthquake in Japanese history until it was surpassed by the 2011 Tōhoku earthquake. It caused moderate-to-severe damage throughout southwestern Honshu, Shikoku and southeastern Kyūshū. The earthquake, and the resulting destructive tsunami, caused more than 5,000 casualties. This event ruptured all of the segments of the Nankai megathrust simultaneously, the only earthquake known to have done this, with an estimated magnitude of 8.6 M_{L} or 8.7 M_{w}. It possibly also triggered the last eruption of Mount Fuji 49 days later.

== Tectonic setting ==
The southern coast of Honshu runs parallel to the Nankai Trough, which marks the subduction of the Philippine Sea plate beneath the Eurasian plate. Movement on this convergent plate boundary leads to many earthquakes, some of them of megathrust type. The Nankai megathrust has five distinct segments (A-E) that can rupture independently. The segments have ruptured either singly or together repeatedly over the last 1,300 years. Megathrust earthquakes on this structure tend to occur in pairs, with a relatively short time gap between them: In addition to two events in 1854, a similar pair occurred in 1944 and 1946. In both instances, the northeastern segment ruptured before the southwestern segment. In the 1707 event, the earthquakes were either simultaneous, or close enough in time to not be distinguished by historical sources.

== Damage ==
The earthquake caused 4,900–21,000 casualties, destroyed 29,000 houses, and triggered at least one major landslide, the Ohya slide in Shizuoka. One of Japan's three largest, it buried a 1.8 km^{2} area under an estimated 120 million m^{3} of debris. The Nara Basin shows evidence of event-induced liquefaction.

== Characteristics ==
=== Earthquake ===
The magnitude of the 1707 event exceeded that of both the 1854 Tōkai and Nankai earthquakes, based on several observations. The uplift at Cape Muroto, Kōchi is estimated at 2.3 m (7 ft 7 in) in 1707 compared to 1.5 m (4 ft 11 in) in 1854, the presence of an area of seismic intensity of 6–7 on the JMA scale in Kawachi Plain, the degree of damage and inundations heights for the corresponding tsunami and records of tsunami at distant locations, such as Nagasaki and Jeju-do, Korea.

The length of the rupture has been estimated from the modelling of the observed tsunami and the location of tsunami deposits. Initial estimates of 605 km, based on four segments rupturing failed to explain tsunami deposits discovered at the western end of the trough. Including an additional area at the southwestern end, part of the so-called Hyuga-nada segment, gave a better match, with a total rupture length in the range 675–700 km.

=== Aftershocks ===
Approximately 16 hours after the mainshock, in the early morning of the following day at around 06:00 JST, a strong earthquake with a magnitude of 7.0 occurred with its epicenter near Fujinomiya. This earthquake was strongly felt in Edo (according to the "Diary of Archbishop Ryuko"), Toyama (as recorded in the "Yoshikawa Essays"), and Nagoya (as noted in the "Parrot Cage Records"). In the domain of the Murayama Sengen Shrine, all houses collapsed, and there were instances of temple and shrine buildings collapsing and fatalities in Fujinomiya and along the Tokaido route.

On 13 February 1708, at 10:00–12:00 JST, a major aftershock with its epicenter off the coast of the Kii Peninsula, occurred. This earthquake was strongly felt in Kyoto (according to the "Diary of Miscellaneous Affairs") and Nagoya (as noted in the "Parrot Cage Records"), and it generated a tsunami. In Kii, salt fields were flooded (according to the "History of Hainan Village"), and in Ise, it affected Yamada, Fukiage-cho, and Hitotsuboki, breaking the embankment of the Miyagawa River (as recorded in the "Jingu Bunko Manuscripts").

=== Tsunami ===
Along the southwestern coast of Kōchi, run-up heights averaged 7.7 m (25 ft) with up to 10 m in places; 25.7 m (84 ft) high at Kure, Nakatosa, Kōchi, and 23 m (75 ft) at Tanezaki.

=== Eruption of Mount Fuji ===
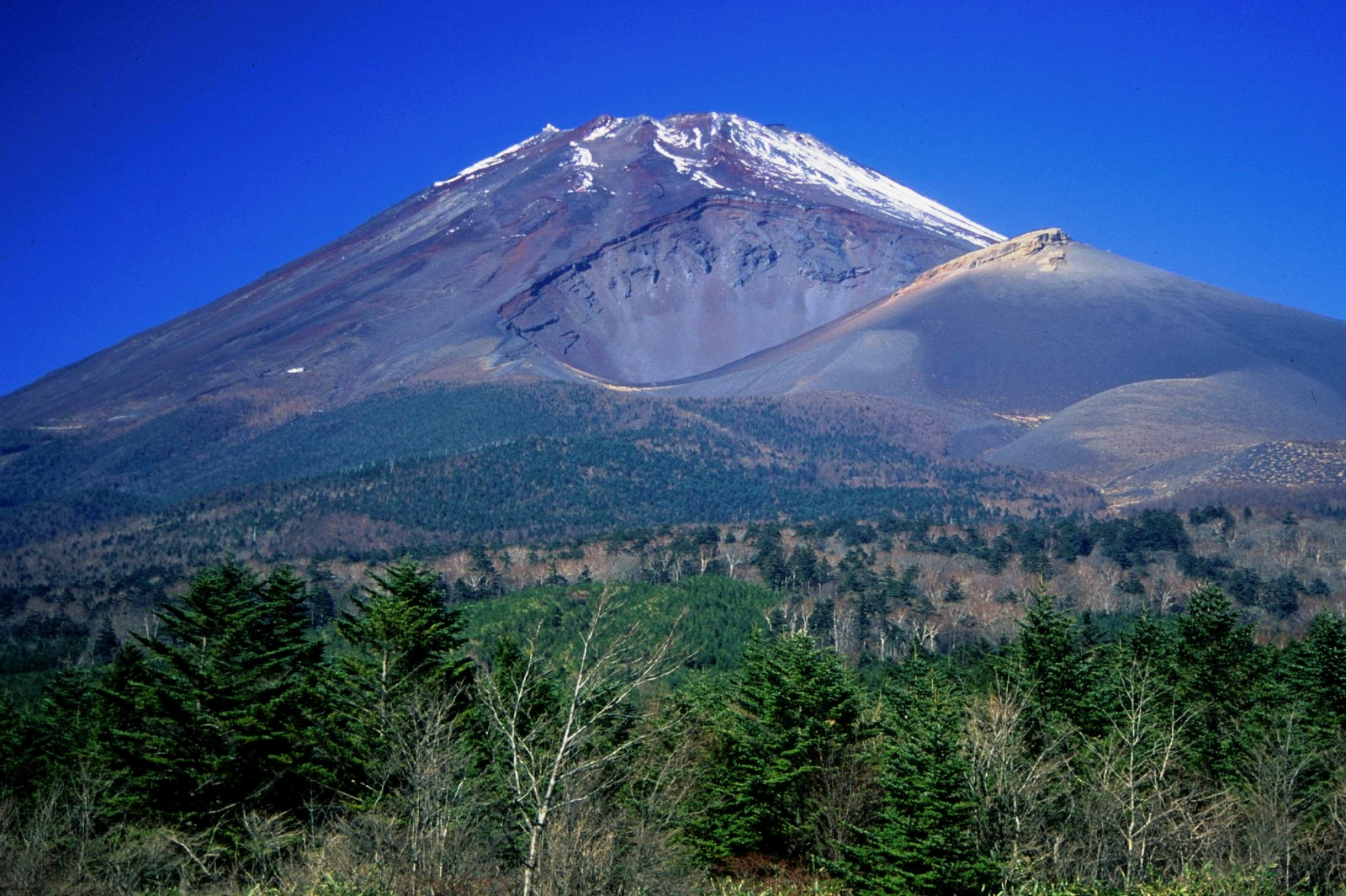
The crater left by the 1707–1708 Hōei eruption

Evidence suggests that changes in stress caused by large earthquakes might be sufficient to trigger volcanic eruptions, assuming that the magma system involved is close to a critical state. The 1707 earthquake might have triggered a shift in static stress that led to pressure changes in the magma chamber beneath Mount Fuji. The volcano erupted on 16 December 1707, 49 days after the earthquake.

== See also ==
- List of earthquakes in Japan
- List of historical earthquakes
- List of megathrust earthquakes
