= 1946 Nankai earthquake =

Magnitude 8.1–8.4 earthquake in Nankaidō, Japan

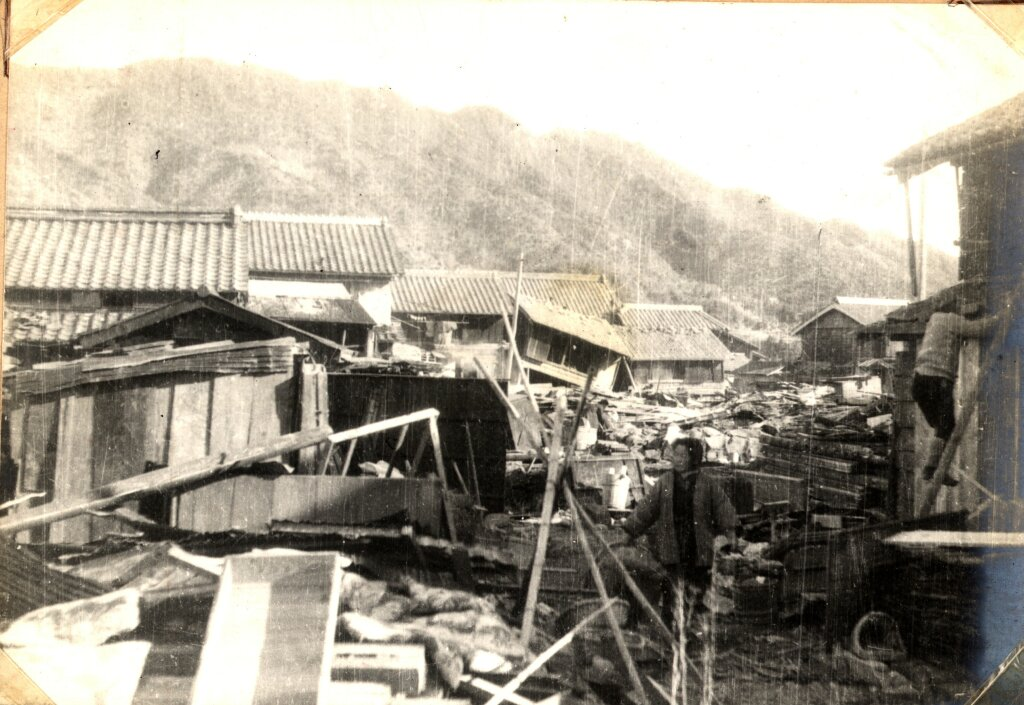

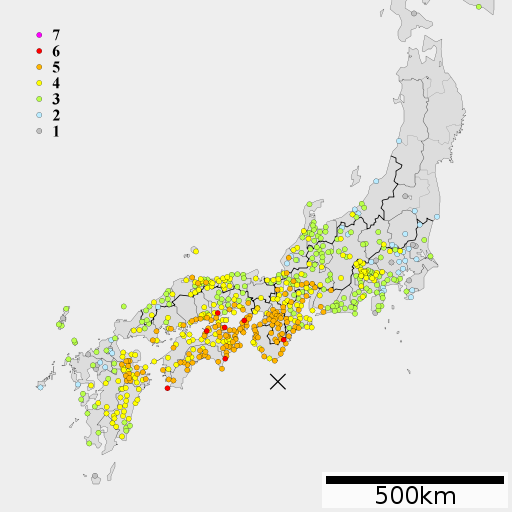

- Location within Japan
- UTC time: 1946-12-20 19:19:10
- ISC event: 898698
- USGS-ANSS: ComCat
- Local date: December 21, 1946
- Local time: 04:19 JST
- Magnitude: M_{w} 8.1; M_{s} 8.3 (ISC)
- Depth: 30 km (19 mi)
- Epicenter: 33.00°N 135.60°E
- Fault: Nankai megathrust
- Areas affected: Japan
- Tsunami: Yes
- Casualties: At least 1362 dead, 2600 injured and 100 missing

The 1946 Nankai earthquake (昭和南海地震 Shōwa Nankai jishin) was a great earthquake in Nankaidō, Japan. It occurred on December 21, 1946, at 04:19 JST (December 20, 19:19 UTC). The earthquake measured between 8.1 and 8.4 on the moment magnitude scale, and was felt from Northern Honshū to Kyūshū. It occurred more than two years after the 1944 Tōnankai earthquake, which ruptured the adjacent part of the Nankai megathrust.

== Geology ==
The Nankai Trough is a convergent boundary where the Philippine Sea plate is being subducted beneath the Eurasian plate. Large earthquakes have been recorded along this zone since the 7th century, with a recurrence time of 100 to 200 years.

== Earthquake ==
The 1946 Nankai earthquake was unusual in its seismological perspective, with a rupture zone estimated from long-period geodetic data that was more than twice as large as that derived from shorter period seismic data. In the center of this earthquake rupture zone, scientists used densely deployed ocean bottom seismographs to detect a subducted seamount 13 kilometres (8 mi) thick by 50 kilometres (31 mi) wide at a depth of 10 kilometres (6 mi). Scientists propose that this seamount might work as a barrier inhibiting brittle seismogenic rupture.

== Casualties and damage ==
The earthquake caused extensive damage, destroying 36,000 homes in southern Honshū alone. The earthquake also caused a huge tsunami that took out another 2,100 homes with its 5–6-metre (16–20-foot) waves.

== See also ==
- List of earthquakes in 1946
- List of earthquakes in Japan
