= 1944 Tōnankai earthquake =

Earthquake and tsunami affecting southern Japan

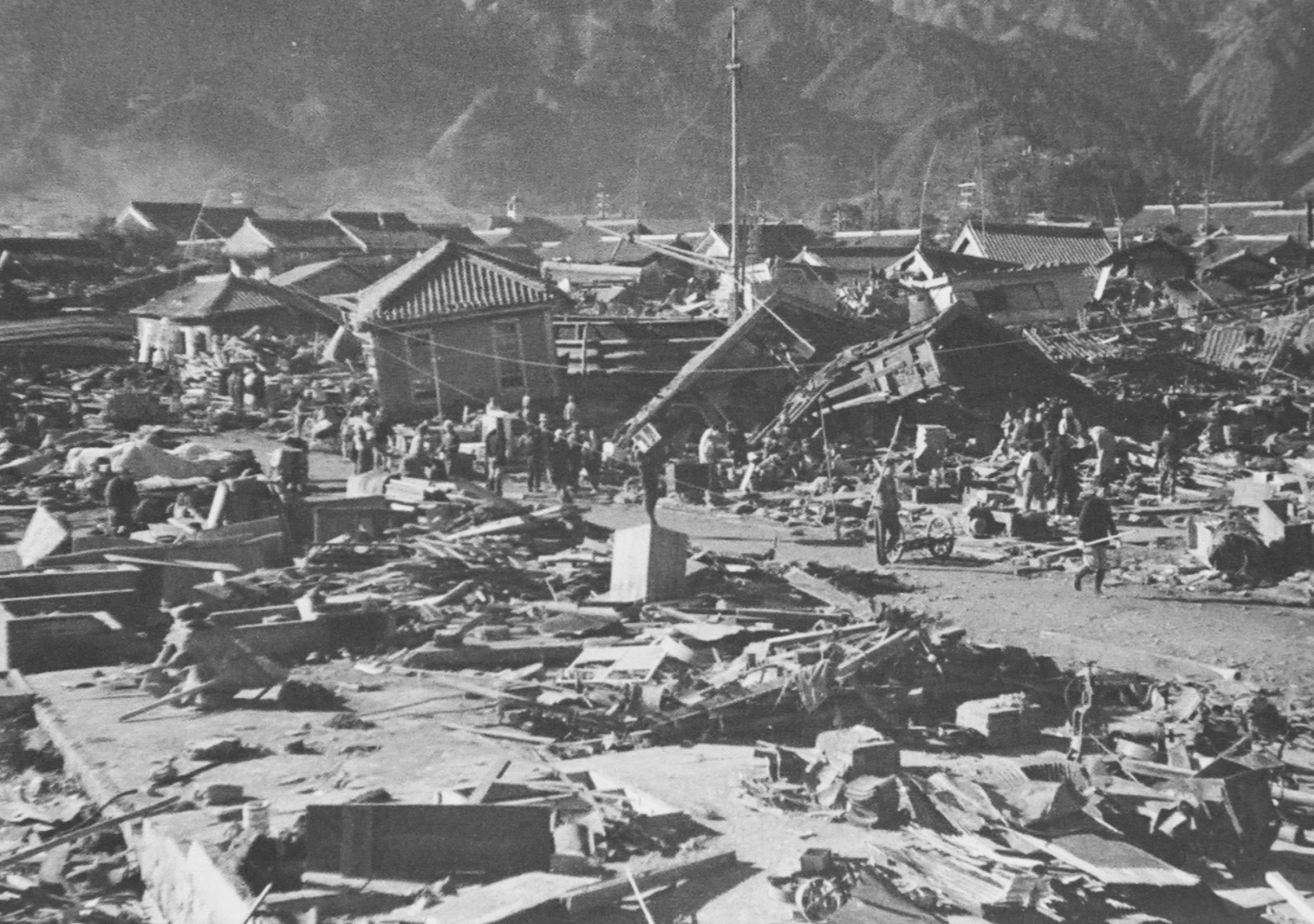

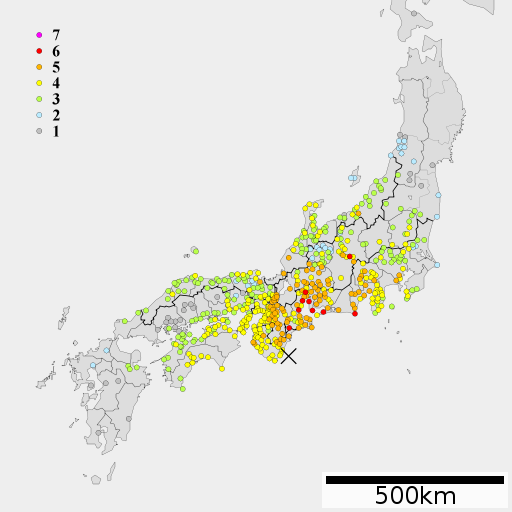

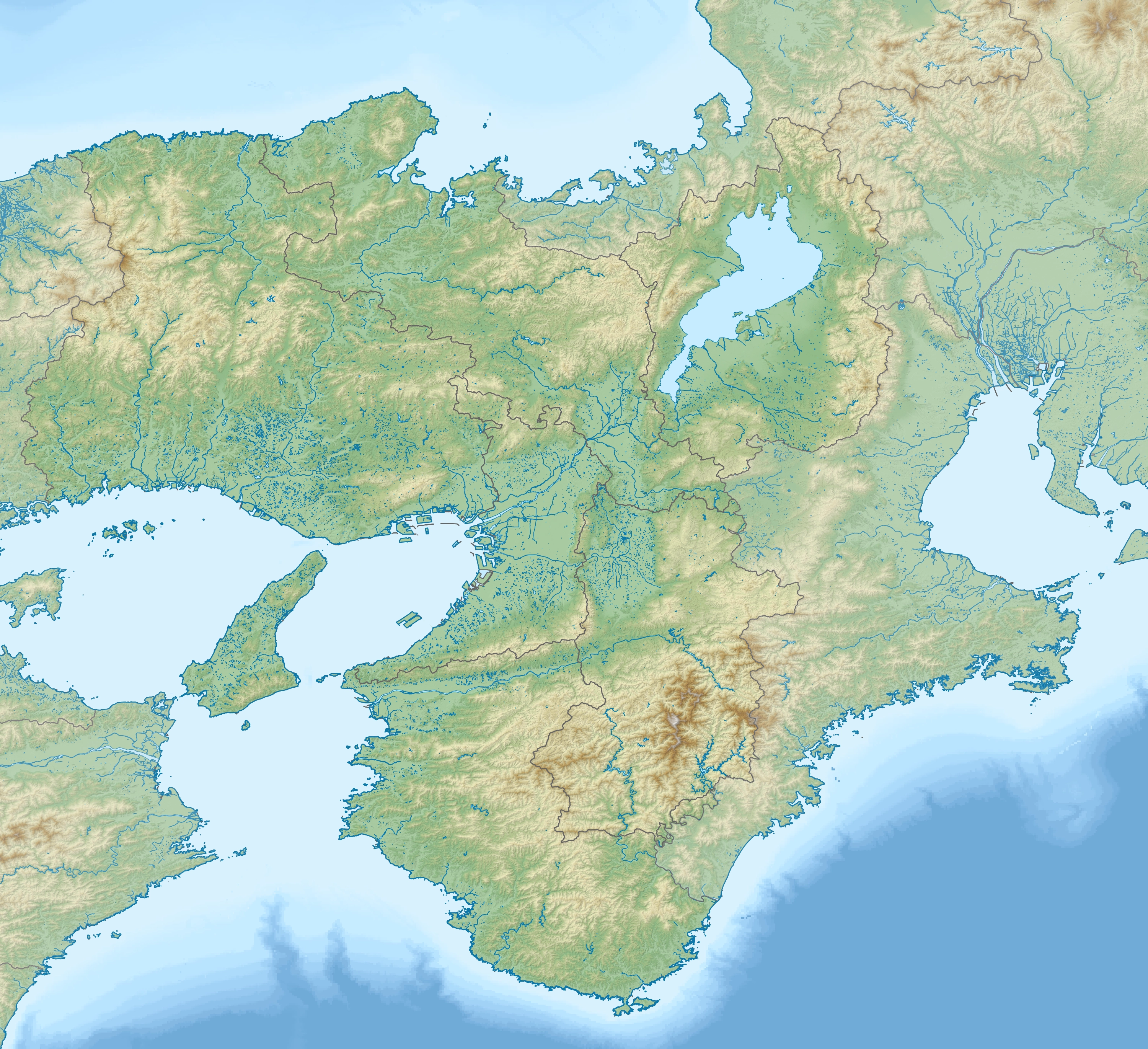
- Location within Kansai region
- UTC time: 1944-12-07 04:35
- ISC event: 899647
- USGS-ANSS: ComCat
- Local date: December 7, 1944
- Local time: 13:35 JST
- Magnitude: M_{w} 8.1; M_{s} 8.2 (ISC)
- Depth: 30 km (19 mi)
- Epicenter: 34.0°N 137.1°E
- Fault: Nankai megathrust
- Areas affected: Empire of Japan, Tōkai region, Wakayama
- Max. intensity: MMI VIII (Severe)
- Tsunami: Yes
- Casualties: 1,223 dead, 2,135 injured

The 1944 Tōnankai earthquake occurred at 13:35 local time (04:35 UTC) on 7 December. It had an estimated magnitude of 8.1 on the moment magnitude scale (making it the strongest known earthquake of 1944) and a maximum felt intensity of greater than 5 Shindo (about VIII (Severe) on the Mercalli intensity scale). It triggered a large tsunami that caused serious damage along the coast of Wakayama Prefecture and the Tōkai region. Together, the earthquake and tsunami caused 3,358 casualties.

== Tectonic setting ==
The southern coast of Honshū runs parallel to the Nankai Trough, which marks the subduction of the Philippine Sea plate beneath the Eurasian plate. Movement on this convergent plate boundary leads to many earthquakes, some of them of megathrust type. The Nankai megathrust has five distinct segments (A–E) that can rupture independently, the segments have ruptured either singly or together repeatedly over the last 1300 years. Megathrust earthquakes on this structure tend to occur in pairs, with a relatively short time gap between them. The 1944 event, which ruptured the C & D segments was followed two years later by the 1946 Nankai earthquake, rupturing segments A & B. In addition to these two events, there were two similar earthquakes in 1854. In each case the northeastern segment ruptured before the southwestern segment.

== Damage ==
There was severe damage from the earthquake on the eastern side of the Kii Peninsula particularly in the cities of Shingū and Tsu. A total of 26,146 houses were destroyed by the shaking, including 11 that burned down and a further 3,059 houses were destroyed by the tsunami. Nearly 47,000 houses were seriously damaged by the combined effects of the earthquake and tsunami. A total of 1,223 people were killed and a further 2,135 were seriously injured.

== Characteristics ==
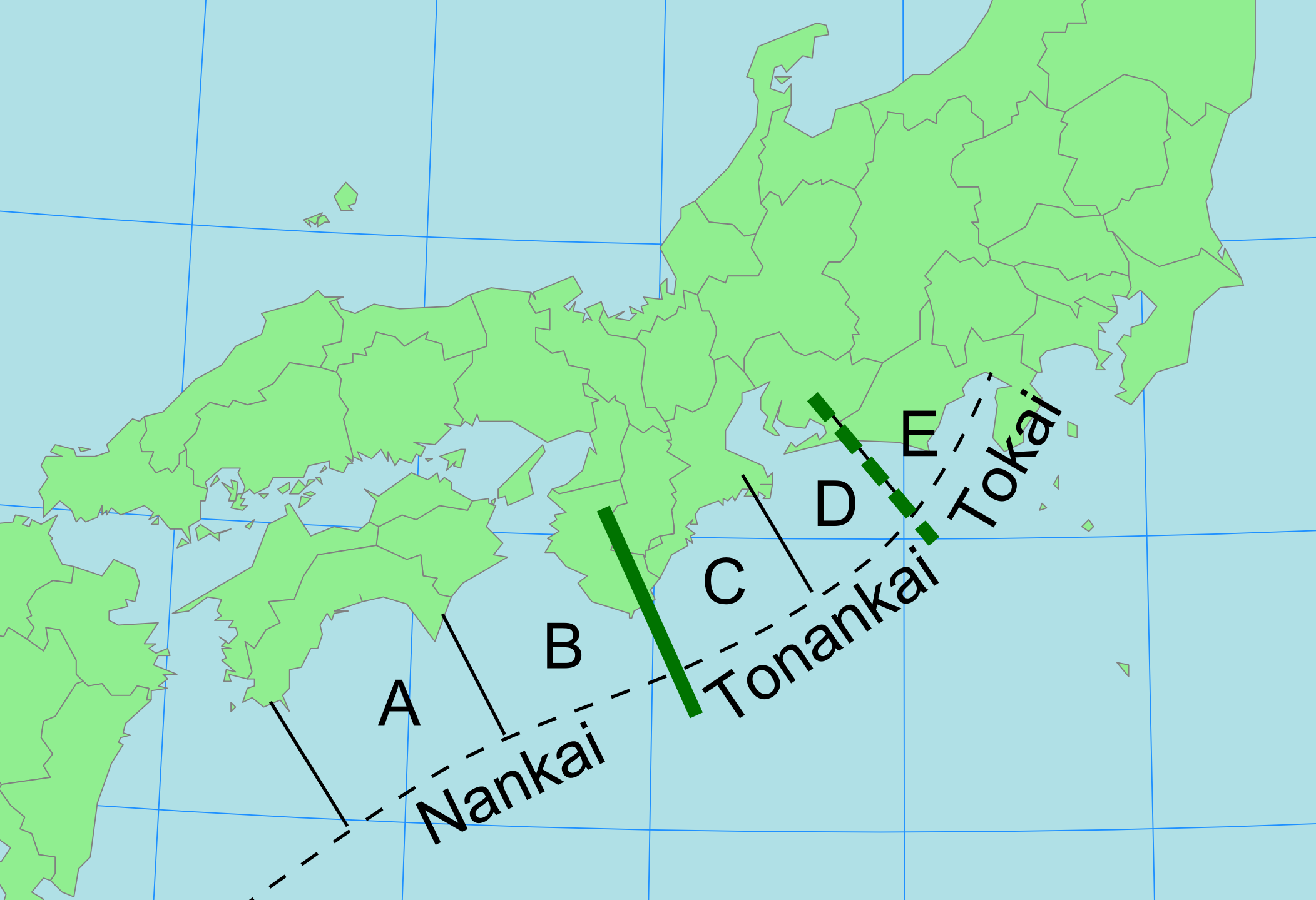
Rupture areas on the megathrust beneath the Nankai Trough

=== Earthquake ===
Felt intensities of greater than Shindo 5 were recorded along the southern coast of Honshū, with Shindo 3–4 in Tokyo. The observed teleseismic response and tsunami records have been matched using a rupture area of 220 x 140 km and a maximum displacement of 2.3 m. It has been suggested that splay faults, linking back into the plate interface, had an important role in generating large tsunamigenic earthquakes along the Nankai trough. The 1944 event could have occurred on such a splay fault.

=== Tsunami ===
The maximum recorded wave height was 10 meters on the Kumano coast. Run-ups in excess of 5 meters were also recorded at several locations along the coasts of Mie and Wakayama Prefectures. The tsunami was observed along the Pacific coast of Japan from Izu Peninsula to Kyushu, and recorded by tide gauges from Alaska to Hawaii.

== Future seismic hazard ==
The segment of the megathrust to the east of the rupture area for the 1944 earthquake has not ruptured since 1854 and the likelihood of a 'Tōkai earthquake' to the east of this earthquake is considered to be high. There is no evidence that this segment has ruptured on its own in the past, although this cannot be ruled out. Any rupture of segment E may also include segments C & D, possibly causing a repeat of the damaging 1854 Tōkai earthquake.

== See also ==
- List of earthquakes in 1944
- List of earthquakes in Japan
