= 684 Hakuhō earthquake =

7th-century earthquake in Japan

Coordinates: 32.8°N 134.3°E

Epicenter

The 684 Hakuho earthquake took place in Japan in 684, and is described in the history book Nihon Shoki from the 8th century. The earthquake took place on 26 November 684 (Julian calendar), in the 13th year of the reign of Emperor Tenmu (Tenmu period). It caused the under-sea inundation of approximately 10 km^{2} (3.9 sq mi) of rice fields.

== Tectonic setting ==
A number of great interplate earthquakes have occurred along the Suruga Trough and Nankai Trough, off the southwestern coasts of Japan. These earthquakes are associated with the subduction of the Philippine Sea Plate. These recurring earthquakes take place at intervals of one or two centuries. These earthquakes take place in pairs, with an example of Tōkai earthquakes taking place in eastern Japan, and an example of Nankai earthquakes taking place in western Japan. The Hakuho earthquake is the oldest recorded Nankai earthquake.

== Earthquake ==
The earthquake was associated with strong ground motion, and damaged a broad area. It affected the capital city of Asuka, and caused a tsunami. There was subsidence in the plain of the Kōchi Prefecture. The welling of water was disrupted in the hot springs of the island of Shikoku, and the springs of the Kii Peninsula in the island of Honshu.

In this earthquake, the sea reportedly "swallowed up" 500,000 shiro of cultivated land in Tosa Province. The Japanese unit shiro is equivalent to 15.13 acres. The governor of this province reported the sinking of many ships by a "high-rising great tide" which accompanied the earthquake. He was describing a tsunami, using the then-used term "oshio".

Regarding the flooding, the Nihon Shoki reports that the local people had never experienced a disaster of this type.

A corresponding Tōkai earthquake may have occurred in 684, but is not clearly recorded in primary sources. The next known Nankai earthquake took place in 887.
