= 1498 Meiō earthquake =

8.6 Ms earthquake and tsunami off the coast of Japan

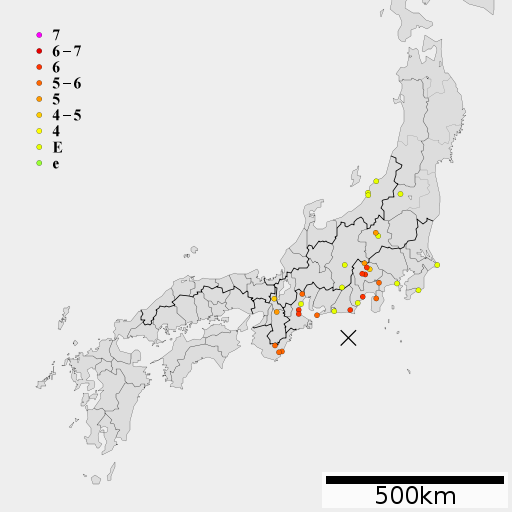

- Location within Japan
- Local date: September 20, 1498
- Local time: 08:00
- Magnitude: 8.6 M_{s}
- Epicenter: 34.0°N 138.1°E
- Fault: Nankai megathrust
- Areas affected: Japan
- Tsunami: Yes
- Casualties: 5,000–41,000 deaths

The 1498 Meiō earthquake (明応地震 Meiō Jishin) struck off the coast of Nankaidō, Japan, at approximately 08:00 local time on September 20, 1498. With an estimated magnitude of 8.6 M_{s}, it triggered a massive tsunami. The exact death toll from this event remains uncertain, but reports range from 5,000 to 41,000 casualties. The tsunami, caused by the Meiō Nankaidō earthquake, washed away the building that housed the statue of the Great Buddha at Kōtoku-in in Kamakura, although the statue itself remained intact.

== Tectonic setting ==
The southern coast of Honshū runs parallel to the Nankai Trough, where the Philippine Sea plate subducts beneath the Eurasian plate. Movement along this convergent boundary results in numerous earthquakes, some of which are of the megathrust type. The Nankai megathrust has five distinct segments (A–E) that can rupture independently. These segments have repeatedly ruptured, either singly or together, over the past 1,300 years.

Megathrust earthquakes along this fault tend to occur in pairs, with a relatively short time gap between them. In addition to two events in 1854, similar earthquakes occurred in 1944 and 1946. In each case, the northeastern segment ruptured before the southwestern segment. In the 1498 event, the earthquake is believed to have ruptured segments C, D, and E, and possibly A and B. If both parts of the megathrust ruptured, the events were either simultaneous or close enough in time to be indistinguishable in historical records.

== Characteristics ==
Severe shaking from this earthquake was recorded from the Bōsō Peninsula in the northeast to the Kii Peninsula in the southwest. A tsunami was recorded in Suruga Bay and at Kamakura, where it destroyed the building housing the statue of the Great Buddha at Kōtoku-in, although the statue itself survived and has remained outdoors ever since. Evidence of severe shaking is also found in records of ground liquefaction in the Nankai area. Tsunami deposits attributed to this earthquake have been identified on the coastal plains around the Sagami Trough and the Izu Peninsula.

An uplift of the seafloor by up to 4 meters has been estimated for this earthquake, with much smaller subsidence near the coast. Lake Hamana became brackish after the tsunami broke through low-lying land between the lake and the Pacific Ocean (Enshū Nada), forming a channel to the sea that still exists today.

== See also ==
- List of historical earthquakes
- List of earthquakes in Japan
