= 1361 Shōhei earthquake =

Earthquake in Japan

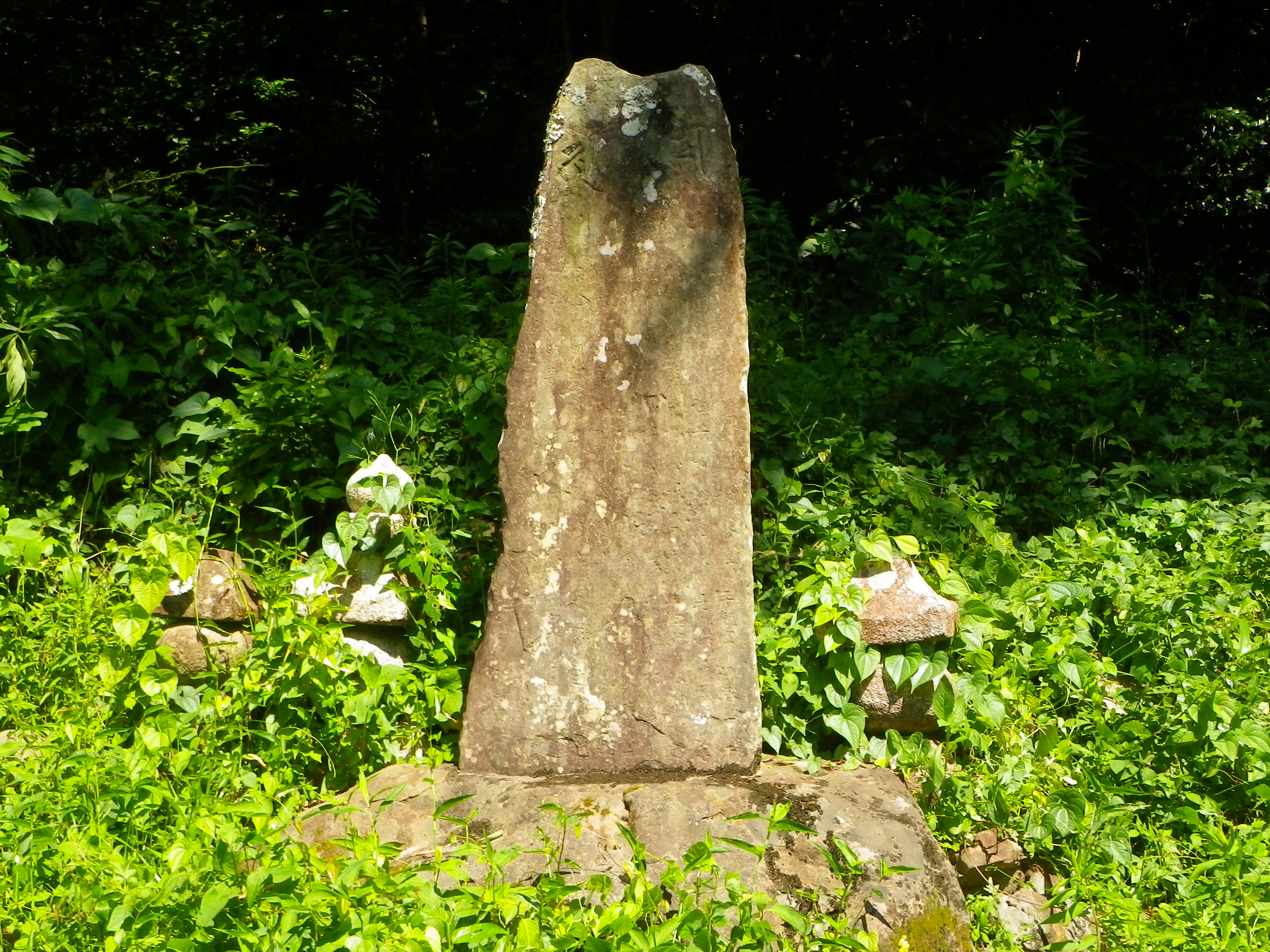
- Yuki koryaku monument (shohei-tsunami)

- Location within Japan
- Local date: 3 August 1361
- Magnitude: 8.2–8.5
- Epicenter: 34.605°N 136.848°E
- Tsunami: Yes

The 1361 Shōhei earthquake (Japanese: 正平地震) was a major earthquake that occurred on 3 August 1361 in Japan. It is believed that this earthquake was one of the Nankai earthquakes. The magnitude was 8.4 M_{s} (Richter magnitude scale was 8.2–8.5) and it triggered a tsunami.

== See also ==
- List of earthquakes in Japan
- Nankai Trough
