= Nankaidō =

Administrative unit of ancient Japan

Nankaidō.

Nankaidō (南海道; Japanese pronunciation: [nä̀ŋ́.kä́ì.dò̞ò̞, nä́ŋ́-], lit. 'Southern Sea Circuit') is a Japanese geographical term. It means both an ancient division of the country and the main road running through it. The road connected provincial capitals in this region. It was part of the Gokishichidō system.

The Nankaidō encompassed the pre-Meiji provincial lands of Kii and Awaji, plus the four provinces that made up the island of Shikoku: Awa, Sanuki, Tosa, and Iyo.

The road extended from Nara to the seacoast to the south on the Kii Peninsula of the island of Honshū in Japan and crossing the sea, extended to Yura (nowadays Sumoto) and then Shikoku.

== Nankaidō earthquakes ==
See List of tsunamis for a full list of Nankai quakes with tsunami.

Many historic earthquakes bear the name "Nankai" or "Nankaido", as specific epicenters were known at the time. Often quakes take on the Japanese era name along with location such as Nankaido. These include:

- 1498 Meiō Nankaidō earthquake
- 1605 Keichō Nankaidō earthquake
- 1854 Ansei-Nankai earthquake
- 1944 Tōnankai earthquake
- 1946 Nankai earthquake (南海地震) measuring 8.4 hit at 4:19 [local time] there was a catastrophic earthquake on the southwest of Japan in the Nankai area. It was felt almost everywhere in the central and western parts of the country. The tsunami washed away 1451 houses, caused 1500 deaths in Japan, and was observed on tide gauges in California, Hawaii, and Peru.

== See also ==
- Comparison of past and present administrative divisions of Japan
