= 1854 Tōkai earthquake =

Earthquake and tsunami off the coast of Japan

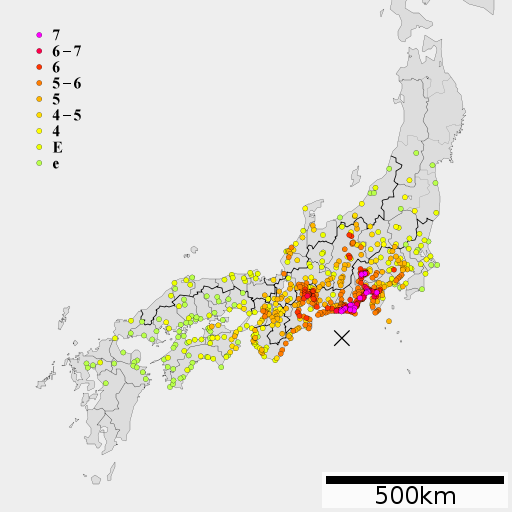

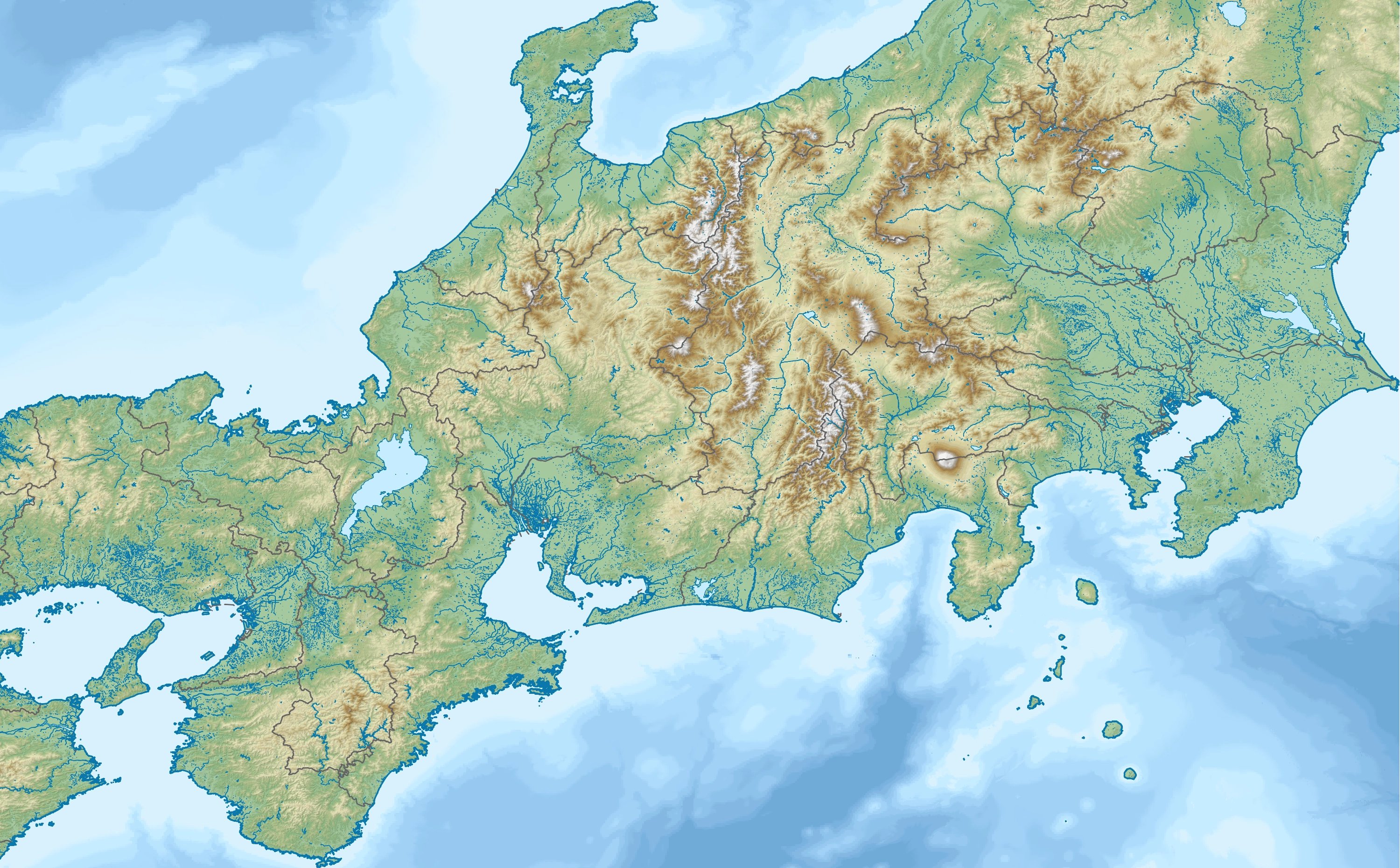
- Location within Central Japan
- Local date: December 23, 1854
- Local time: 09:00
- Magnitude: 8.4 M_{L}
- Epicenter: 34.0°N 137.8°E
- Fault: Nankai megathrust
- Areas affected: Japan, Tōkai region
- Tsunami: Yes
- Casualties: >2,000

The 1854 Tōkai earthquake was the first of the Ansei great earthquakes (1854–1855). It occurred at about 09:00 local time on 23 December 1854. It had a magnitude of 8.4 and caused a damaging tsunami. More than 10,000 buildings were destroyed and several thousand people were killed. It was the first of the three Ansei great earthquakes; the 1854 Ansei-Nankai earthquake of similar size hit southern Honshu the following day.

== Background ==
The southern coast of Honshu runs parallel to the Nankai Trough, which marks the subduction of the Philippine Sea plate beneath the Eurasian plate. Movement on this convergent plate boundary leads to many earthquakes, some of them of megathrust type. The Nankai megathrust has five distinct segments (A-E) that can rupture independently, the segments have ruptured either singly or together repeatedly over the last 1300 years. Megathrust earthquakes on this structure tend to occur in pairs, with a relatively short time gap between them. In addition to the two events in 1854, there were similar earthquakes in 1944 and 1946. In each case the northeastern segment ruptured before the southwestern segment.

== Damage ==
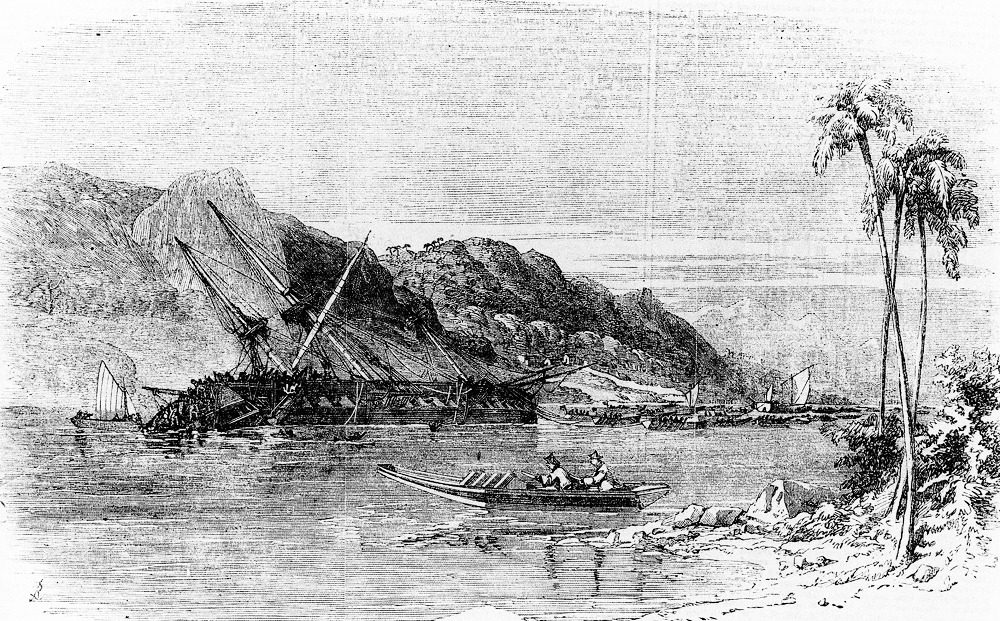
The wreckage of Diana following the 1854 Ansei-Tōkai earthquake and tsunami, Illustrated London News, 1856.

Much of central Japan experienced seismic intensities of 5 (on the JMA scale). Damage from this earthquake was particularly severe in the coastal areas of Shizuoka Prefecture from Numazu to Tenryū River, with many houses being damaged or destroyed.

On the east side of the Izu Peninsula, Shimoda was hit by the tsunami one hour after the earthquake. A series of nine waves struck the city, destroying 840 houses and claiming 122 lives. Diana, the flagship of the visiting Russian admiral, Yevfimy Putyatin, in Japan to negotiate what would become the Treaty of Shimoda, was spun round 42 times on its moorings and was so badly damaged that it sank in a later storm.

At Suruga Bay, on the west side of the Izu Peninsula, the village of Iruma was destroyed and a 10 m high sand dome was deposited, on which the village was later reconstructed.

== Characteristics ==
=== Earthquake ===
The rupture area, magnitude and epicenter have been estimated from seismic intensity measurements, information about tsunami arrival times and evidence of co-seismic uplift/subsidence.

=== Tsunami ===
In most of the affected areas, run-up heights were in the range of 4–6 m. However, at Iruma, run-up heights of 13.2 and 16.5 m have been measured, much higher than most of the surrounding area. This and the deposition of the unusual sand dome, with an estimated volume of 700,000 m^{3}, is interpreted to have been caused by the effects of resonance in the V-shaped Suruga bay.

== See also ==
- List of earthquakes in Japan
- List of historical earthquakes
- List of tsunamis
