= Nankai Trough =

Trough off the coast of Japan

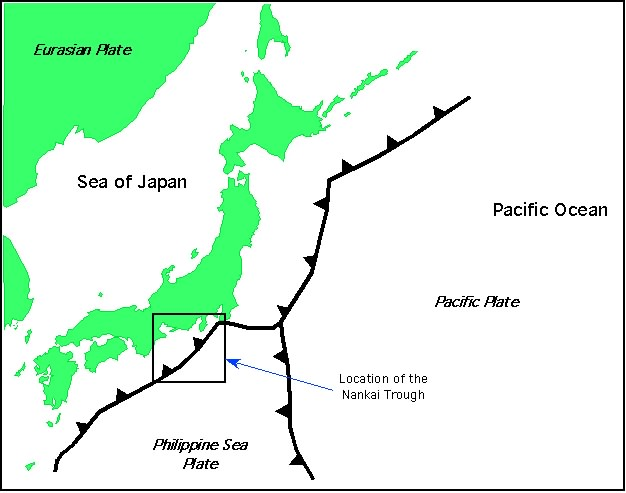
Location of the Nankai Trough

The Nankai Trough (南海トラフ, Nankai Torafu; Southern Sea Trough) is a submarine trough located south of the Nankaidō region of Japan's island of Honshu, extending approximately 900 km (559 mi) offshore. The underlying fault, the Nankai megathrust, is the source of the devastating Nankai megathrust earthquakes, while the trough itself is potentially a major source of hydrocarbon fuel, in the form of methane clathrate.

In plate tectonics, the Nankai Trough marks a subduction zone that is caused by subduction of the Philippine Sea plate beneath Japan, part of the Eurasian plate (Kanda et al., 2004). This plate boundary would be an oceanic trench except for a high flux of sediments that fills the trench. Within the Nankai Trough there is a large amount of deformed trench sediments (Ike, 2004), making one of Earth's best examples of accretionary wedge. Furthermore, seismic reflection studies have revealed the presence of basement highs that are interpreted as seamounts that are covered in sediments (Ike, 2004). The northern part of the trough is known as the Suruga Trough, while to the east is the Sagami Trough. The Nankai Trough runs roughly parallel to the Japan Median Tectonic Line.

== Rates of tectonic motion ==
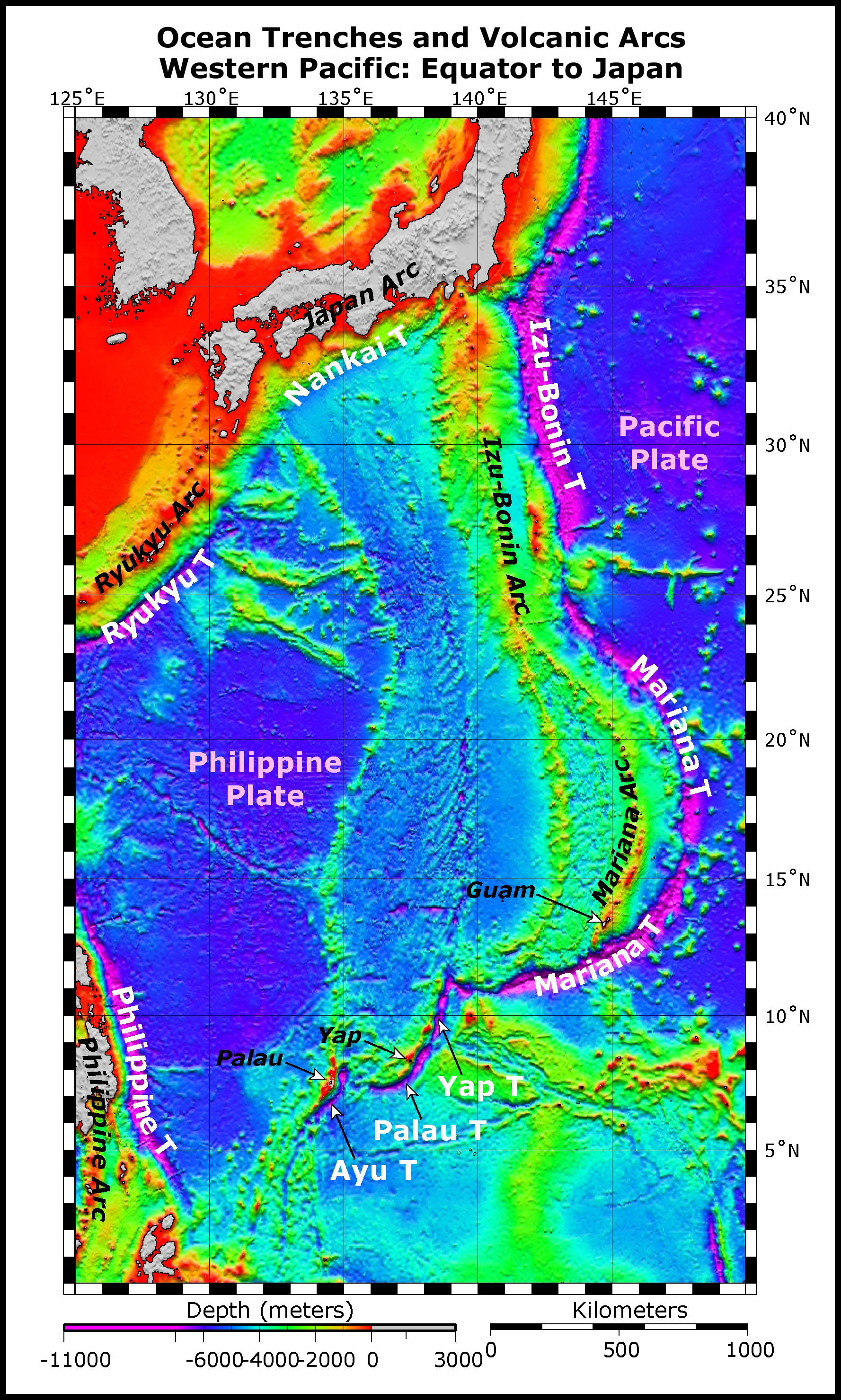
Undersea geographic features of the western Pacific

Conventional geologic estimates of plate movement velocities are difficult in the Nankai Trough because there are no spreading ridges that bound the tectonic plate. This area was not in the original NUVEL models (DeMets et al., 1990). However, a more recent study that included the Philippine Sea plate was based on data from the NUVEL-1A model (Zang et al., 2002). This study estimates that subduction in the Nankai Trough is about 43 mm/yr. REVEL-based calculations indicate that there is no accumulation of strain at the trench. The rates of movement have been calculated to be in a range of 3.0 ± 1.8 mm/yr to 11.1 ± 1.7 mm/yr (Sella et al., 2002). As mentioned previously, the NUVEL-1A plate motion model does not include the Philippine Sea plate. This is because the mathematics of this model only used twelve plates, and the Philippine Sea and Eurasian convergent margin were not included. However, using the Eurasia to North America plate motion, the estimated rate was 2–4 mm/yr (DeMets et al., 1990). This is not in agreement with the REVEL model, seemingly indicating that the NUVEL-1A model may need further revision.

== Sedimentology ==
The deposits in the trough are primarily trench-wedge turbidites (Spinelli et al., 2007). There are indications of an increase in the retention of porosity within the rock. Typically porosity decreases with increasing depth. However, there is an anomalous preservation of porosity at depth at drill site 1173. This has been attributed to post-depositional opal cementation that is preserving the porosity (Spinelli et al., 2007). The detrital clays, primarily smectite, display variation over time and location in the Nankai Trough as well as the Shikoku basin. At depth there is an increase in the smectite clay content in the sediments, inferring that there has been a change in the deposition source rock (Steurer et al., 2003). Furthermore, there is a geothermal alteration of the smectite, converting it to illite clay (Steurer et al., 2003).

== Tectonic structure ==
The Nankai Trough is actively deforming and marks a region of seismic activity. Deformation is concentrated in the outermost imbricate zone, with a significant amount of "out of sequence" thrusting occurring landward. Based on the work of Operto et al., 2006, several areas of intense tectonic activity in the Nankai Trough were identified using full waveform tomography. The upper portion of the upper accretionary prism and the underlying backstop are currently undergoing a great deal of compressional pressure. Several thrust faults were identified by Operto et al., 2006, of which the thrust faults closest to the subduction zone are active. Furthermore, Pisani et al., 2006, identified protothrusts and decollement surfaces along the Nankai Trough. Recently there has been an increase in interest in the release of water from illite clays in subducting sediments. The conversion of smectite to illite (illitization) in subduction zones is likely driven by the higher temperature found in the subduction zone as opposed to non-subducting sediments (Saffer et al., 2005). IODP Expedition 370 will seek to find the temperature limit of the deepest life on Earth by drilling in the Nankai Trough, where heat flow is particularly high near its boundary with the subducting young, hot Philippine Sea tectonic plate. At the targeted site, the geothermal gradient is about four times steeper than elsewhere in the Pacific Ocean. Reaching temperatures of approximately 130 °C in other areas would require collecting cores from approximately 4 kilometers below the seafloor, rather than 1.2 kilometers as planned by Expedition 370. Eventually, IODP Expedition 370 reached a temperature of ~120 °C at 1.2 kilometers below the seafloor with mineral evidence showing that there are localized depths with significantly higher temperatures due to hot fluids.

== Seismicity ==
Depth of earthquake foci in cross section, modified from Obana, et al., 2002

The Nankai Trough is the near-surface extension of a zone of active seismicity that dips beneath SW Japan. The rupture zone has been subdivided into five areas with respect to seismic modelling (Mitsui et al., 2004). These five subdivisions show interesting differences in earthquake behavior: frequency of earthquakes varying on a 90 to 150-year cycle (Mitsui, et al., 2004; Tanioka et al., 2004), similar slip occurrences along the fault segments, the order of subdivision faulting, and finally, different failure features. Hydrologic observatories were placed in boreholes drilled in 2000 (IODP sites 808 and 1173) in an attempt to quantify changes in pore-fluid pressure that are a result of the oncoming Philippine Sea plate (Davis et al., 2006). Site 808 is located in the front section of the main thrust fault, while site 1173 is located approximately 11 km from the frontal thrust zone (Hitoshi et al., 2006). Other interesting results of the pressure measurements were the pressure changes that resulted from sediment deformation near boreholes and the effect of very low earthquake swarms at the time of pressure changes (Davis et al., 2006). The working hypothesis is that pressure changes indicate a change in the elastic strain within the formation (Davis et al., 2006).

A seaward change in the pressure as measured by the borehole instruments likely indicates a relaxation of the sediments from the previous major thrust earthquake. Furthermore, the short period seismicity appears to have some degree of dependency on bathymetric highs such as seamounts. This was concluded by Kanda et al., 2004, through inversion analysis of seismic data. Historically, the most recent large-scale earthquake to occur in the Nankai Trough was in 1944 off the Kii Peninsula. Using recent ocean bottom seismograph studies, it has been determined that most of the seismicity occurs near the trough axis (Obana et al., 2006). Along the western area of the Nankai Trough, seismicity appears to be related to irregularities in crustal structure such as fractures generated from the subducted seafloor, including backarc basin crust of the Shikoku Basin, as well as due to serpentization of uppermost mantle beneath the overriding plate (Obana et al., 2006). Recent large scale earthquakes resulting from subduction along the Nankai Trough have occurred in areas of large scale increases in the dip angle of the subducting plate (Hori et al., 2004).

A March 2025 estimate by the Japanese government puts the numbers of deaths caused by a megaquake in this area to be about 298000 and the buildings to be destroyed at about 2.35 million.

== Petroleum significance ==
Distribution of identified gas hydrate locations, in green and the location of selected subduction zones, red lines, modified from Collet, 2002.

Drill cores from the seaward edge of the Nankai Trough (where the heat flow is one of the highest in the region) reveal that sediments there only reach pre-oil window to early oil window thermal maturities. However, the trough is potentially a major source of hydrocarbon fuel, in the form of methane clathrate. Nevertheless as of 2014 there is no commercial exploitation.

At depth in the ocean bottoms, in some cases water can form an ice-like solid structure that has methane trapped in its crystalline lattice, forming gas hydrates. The source of water for the formation of gas hydrates frequently comes from the dewatering of a subducting slab as well as the overriding plate (Muramatsu et al., 2006). Gas hydrates nearest the trough appear to be sourced mainly from dewatering associated with subduction, while with increasing distance from the trough the sourcing is more a result of lateral movement of methane enriched waters (Muramatsu et al., 2006). This was determined by drilling a series of boreholes and measuring the concentration, as well as radiometric age determination of the halogen elements iodine, bromine, and chlorine (Tomaru et al., 2007). The age determination of the iodine indicated multiple methane sources.

It has been estimated that convergent margins may contain up to two-thirds of the total gas hydrate volume on the Earth (Kastner, 2001). The Nankai Trough has been described as containing a large amount of gas hydrates and is one of the best studied sites of gas hydrate formations (Collett, 2002; Saito et al., 2007). The information concerning the gas hydrates in the Nankai Trough was initially published in 2000 by the Japan National Oil Corporations. The data in the news release came from a series of boreholes what were started in the late 1990s. In this area, the main sedimentological controls for the accumulation of gas hydrates are the sand-rich areas of the trough (Collett, 2002). Well coring indicates the presence of at least three gas hydrate zones. Krason, 1994, estimated that there are 0.42 to 4.2×10^{12} cubic meters of methane within the gas hydrates. Seismically, the high bottom simulating reflectors are considered indicative of gas hydrates (Colwell et al., 2004). Methane-rich horizons have been identified as areas of higher attenuation of sonic frequencies (10 to 20 kHz) and only slight attenuation of seismic frequencies (30 to 110 Hz) (Matsushima, 2006).

== Thermal history ==
The Nankai accretionary complex is an area with high heat flow. Its thermal history is complex due to multiple heating events or property changes. IODP Expeditions drilled the accretionary complex of the Nankai Trough and reveal the thermal history with drill core analyses. The area was originally a basin (Shikoku Basin) with active hydrothermal activity during its formation. As basin formation stopped and sedimentation took place, the sediments acted like a blanket to trap the heat below. Rapid sedimentation resulted in a greater retention of heat. There was also underground fluid flow with the fluids being much hotter than the present-day temperature of the sediments, which affected mineralization and, potentially, the physical and biological properties of the region.

== See also ==
- Nankai Trough gas hydrate site
- Subduction
