= List of earthquakes in Japan =

Map of earthquakes in Japan since 1900, with magnitudes. Click for date and details. (map data)

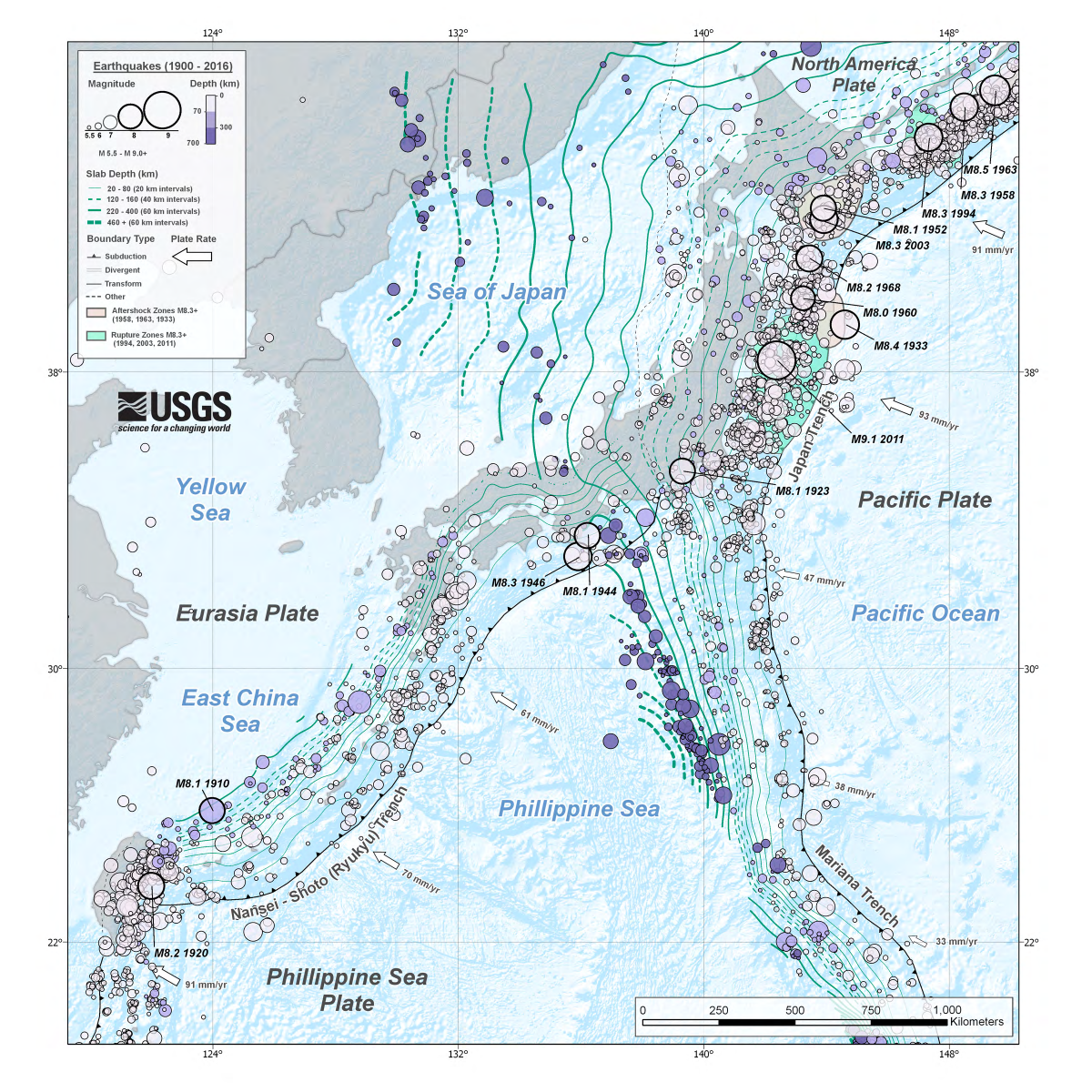
Earthquakes M5.5+ around Japan (1900–2016) M7.0–7.9=163 EQs, M8.0+=14 EQs.

This is a list of earthquakes in Japan with either a magnitude greater than or equal to 7.0 or which caused significant damage or casualties. As indicated below, magnitude is measured on the Richter scale (M_{L}) or the moment magnitude scale (M_{w}), or the surface wave magnitude scale (M_{s}) for very old earthquakes. The present list is not exhaustive, and furthermore reliable and precise magnitude data is scarce for earthquakes that occurred before the development of modern measuring instruments.

== History ==
Although there is mention of an earthquake in Yamato in what is now Nara Prefecture on August 23, 416, the first earthquake to be reliably documented took place in Nara prefecture on May 28, 599 during the reign of Empress Suiko, destroying buildings throughout Yamato province. Many historical records of Japanese earthquakes exist. The Imperial Earthquake Investigation Committee was created in 1892 to conduct a systematic collation of the available historical data, published in 1899 as the Catalogue of Historical Data on Japanese Earthquakes.

Following the 1923 Great Kantō earthquake, the Imperial Earthquake Investigation Committee was superseded by the Earthquake Research Institute in 1925. In modern times, the catalogues compiled by Tatsuo Usami are considered to provide the most authoritative source of information on historic earthquakes, with the 2003 edition detailing 486 that took place between 416 and 1888.

== Earthquake measurement ==
In Japan, the Shindo scale is commonly used to measure earthquakes by seismic intensity instead of magnitude. This is similar to the Modified Mercalli intensity scale used in the United States, the Liedu scale used in China or the European Macroseismic Scale (EMS), meaning that the scale measures the intensity of an earthquake at a given location instead of measuring an energy source an earthquake releases at its epicenter (its magnitude) as the Richter scale does.

Unlike other seismic intensity scales, which normally have twelve levels of intensity, shindo (震度; seismic intensity, literally "degree of shaking") as used by the Japan Meteorological Agency is a unit with ten levels, ranging from shindo zero, a very light tremor, to shindo seven, a severe earthquake. Intermediate levels for earthquakes with shindo five and six are "weak" or "strong", according to the degree of destruction they cause. Earthquakes measured at shindo four and lower are considered to be weak to mild, while those measured at five and above can cause heavy damage to furniture, wall tiles, wooden houses, reinforced concrete buildings, roads, gas and water pipes.

== List ==
Date and time	Magnitude	Fatalities	Name of quake	Name in Kanji	Rōmaji name	Epicenter	Description
November 29, 684 (proleptic Gregorian calendar); November 26, 684 (Julian calendar)	8.4 M_{K} (Kawasumi scale)	101–1,000	684 Hakuhō earthquake	白鳳南海地震	Hakuhou Nankai jishin	32.8°N 134.3°E	link between earthquakes and tsunamis first confirmed
June 5, 745 (G); June 1, 745 (J)	7.9 M_{K}		occurred in Mino Province	天平地震	Tenpyō jishin	34.8°N 135.5°E	
July 13, 869 (G); July 9, 869 (J)	8.9 M_{K}	1,000+	869 Jōgan earthquake	貞観地震	Jōgan jishin	38.5°N 143.8°E	Tsunami flooded Sendai plain
June 16, 1026 (G); June 10, 1026 (J)	7.8 M_{JMA}	1,000	1026 Manju tsunami	万寿地震	Manju jishin	34.8°N 131.8°E	Tsunami flooded Iwami Province
May 27, 1293 (G); May 20, 1293 (J)	7.1 M_{s}	23,024	1293 Kamakura earthquake	鎌倉大地震	Kamakura Daijishin	35.2°N 139.4°E, near Kamakura, Kanagawa	
August 3, 1361 (G); July 26, 1361 (J)	8.4 M_{s}		1361 Shōhei earthquake	正平南海地震	Shōhei Nankai Jishin	33.0°N 135.0°E	Triggered tsunami
September 20, 1498 (G); September 11, 1498 (J)	8.6 M_{K}	31,000	1498 Meiō earthquake	明応地震	Meiō jishin	34.0°N 138.1°E, Nankai |	
January 18, 1586	7.9 M_{K}		1586 Tenshō earthquake	天正大地震	Tenshō Daijishin		Islands in Ise Bay reportedly disappeared
February 3, 1605	7.9 M_{K}	5,000+	1605 Keichō earthquake	慶長大地震	Keichō Daijishin	33.5°N 138.5°E	May have been two separate earthquakes; tsunami greatly exceeded that expected from the magnitude of the earthquake
September 27, 1611	6.9 M_{K}	3,700+ (Official estimate)	1611 Aizu earthquake	会津地震	Aizu Jishin	Aizu basin, Fukushima Prefecture	
December 2, 1611	8.1	2,000+	1611 Sanriku earthquake	慶長三陸地震	Keichō Sanriku Jishin	39.0°N 144.4°E, Iwate Prefecture	
1637	8.5–9.0 M	unknown	17th-century earthquake	寛文十勝沖地震 (scientific)	kanbun Tokachi-oki jishin	Offshore Tokachi region	inferred from tsunami deposits. The exact age is uncertain.
June 16, 1662	7.25 – 7.6 M	700–900	1662 Kanbun earthquake	寛文近江・若狭地震	kanbun Ōmi wakasa jishin	south of Lake Biwa	
October 30, 1662	7.9 M_{w}	200	1662 Hyūga-nada earthquake	外所地震	Dondokoro Jishin	Offshore of Kyushu	
November 4, 1677	8.3–8.6 M_{w}	569	1677 Bōsō earthquake	延宝房総沖地震	Enpō Bōsō-oki Jishin	Offshore Bōsō Peninsula	
December 31, 1703	8.0 M_{L}	5,233	1703 Genroku earthquake	元禄大地震	Genroku Daijishin	Edo	
October 28, 1707	8.6 M_{L}	5,000+	1707 Hōei earthquake	宝永地震	Hōei jishin	Off the Kii Peninsula	damaged Honshu, Shikoku and Kyūshū; last eruption of Mount Fuji
April 24, 1771	7.4 M_{K}	13,486	1771 Great Yaeyama Tsunami	八重山地震	Yaeyama jishin	24.0°N 124.3°E, Yaeyama Islands	Tsunami over 40 m (130 ft)
May 21, 1792	6.4 M_{K}	15,448	1792 Unzen landslide and tsunami	島原大変肥後迷惑	Unzen jishin (Shimabara Taihen Higo Meiwaku)	32.8°N 130.3°E	Changes to the Ariake Sea coastline, in the center of Mount Unzen, Kumamoto Prefecture (right) and the Amakusa Islands (see below) were affected by the tsunami An earthquake caused by volcanic activity of Mount Unzen (in the Shimabara Peninsula Nagasaki, Japan). It killed 15,000 people altogether, due in large part to a tsunami that was triggered by the collapse of nearby Mount Mayuyama's southern flank into the bay. The incident is also referred to with the phrase 'Shimabara erupted, Higo affected' (島原大変肥後迷惑), as many people in Higo, (Kumamoto, located 20 km (12 mi) away across the Ariake Sea) were also killed by the resulting tsunami, which then bounced back to hit Shimabara again.
December 18, 1828	6.9 M_{K}	1,559 (official confirmed)	1828 Sanjō earthquake	三条地震	Sanjō Jishin	Sanjo, Niigata Prefecture (then Echigo Province)	According to the official confirmed report, 21,134 houses and buildings were damaged, and 1,204 of them burned down. There were 1,559 human fatalities, and 2,666 injured people in the affected area.
December 7, 1833	7.5 M_{JMA}	150	1833 Shōnai earthquake	庄内沖地震	Shōnai-oki Jishin	Shōnai, Yamagata Prefecture	Destructive tsunami, one of the largest tsunamis in the Sea of Japan.
April 25, 1843	8.0 M_{JMA}	91	1843 Tokachi earthquake	天保十勝沖地震	Tenpō Tokachi-oki Jishin	42.0°N 146.0°E	Minor damage from shaking but many buildings swept away by the tsunami. 45 people died at Akkeshi on Hokkaido and a further 46 at Taro on the Sanriku coast of Honshu.
May 8, 1847	7.3 M	8,600+	1847 Zenkoji earthquake	善光寺地震	Zenkōji Jishin	Nagano Basin (then Shinano Province)	In the central area of Nagano, many buildings collapsed, including Zenkōji temple. The earthquake triggered a complex variety of resulting disasters, which included fires, landslides, and flooding due to the formation and subsequent collapse of a "dam" made of debris from the collapsed buildings. According to the confirmed official report, the death toll throughout the region reached at least 8,600. 21,000 houses were damaged and 3,400 burned, and an additional 44,000 homes were damaged by the landslides in the area.
July 9, 1854	7.25 M_{K}	995 (official confirmed)	1854 Iga–Ueno earthquake	伊賀上野地震	Iga Ueno Jishin	Iga, Mie Prefecture (then Iga Province)	According to the official confirmed report, 2,576 houses and buildings were damaged, with 995 human fatalities and 994 injures in the affected area.
December 23, 1854	8.4 M_{K}	2,000 (estimated)	1854 Tōkai earthquake	安政東海地震	Ansei Tōkai Jishin	Suruga Bay	
December 24, 1854	8.4 M_{K}	10,000+	1854 Nankai earthquake	安政南海地震	Ansei Nankai Jishin	Nankai Trough	Over 10,000 people from the Tōkai region down to Kyushu were killed.
November 11, 1855	6.9 M_{K}	6,641	1855 Edo earthquake	安政江戸地震	Ansei Edo Jishin	Edo, near the mouth of the Arakawa River	Edo earthquake in 1855
April 9, 1858	7.0	200–300	1858 Hietsu earthquake	飛越地震	Hietsu Jishin	Atotsugawa Fault	
March 18, 1872	7.1 M_{K}	551 (official confirmed)	1872 Hamada earthquake	浜田地震	Hamada Jishin	off coast Hamada, Shimane Prefecture	According to the official confirmed report, 4506 houses were damaged by the earthquake, 230 houses were burned, 551 people were killed, and landslides destroyed 6567 homes in the affected area. This quake occurred at 16:40 local time.
February 22, 1880	5.5–6.0	0	1880 Yokohama earthquake	横浜地震	Yokohama Jishin	Yokohama City	The damage was minor. However, the Seismological Society of Japan was established in response to the quake.
July 28, 1889	6.3	20	1889 Kumamoto earthquake	熊本地震	Kumamoto Jishin	Tatsuda fault	First major earthquake after the establishment of the Seismological Society of Japan in 1880.
October 28, 1891	8.0 M_{L}	7,273	1891 Mino–Owari earthquake	濃尾地震	Nōbi Jishin	Neodani Fault	
June 20, 1894	6.6 M_{L}	31	1894 Tokyo earthquake	明治東京地震	Meiji-Tokyo Jishin	Tokyo Bay	The death toll was 31 killed and 157 injured.
October 22, 1894	7.0 M_{L}	726 (Official confirmed)	1894 Shōnai earthquake	庄内地震	Shōnai Jishin	Sakata, Yamagata Prefecture	According to the official confirmed report, 14,118 houses and buildings were damaged and 2,148 were burned. There were 726 human fatalities and 8,403 people injured in the damaged area. A large-scale fire broke out in Sakata, and around the Shonai plain area, many instances of cracked earth, sinking ground, sand boils, and fountains were observed.
June 15, 1896	8.5 M_{L}	22,000+	1896 Sanriku earthquake	明治三陸地震	Meiji Sanriku Jishin		This quake occurred off the coast of Sanriku in Iwate Prefecture, which caused a tsunami of 25 m (82 ft) to strike 35 minutes after the quake, destroying hundreds of houses and killed over 22,000 people. Tsunami were also observed as far away as Hawaii and in California.
September 1, 1923	8.3 M_{L}	142,800	1923 Great Kantō earthquake	大正関東地震 (関東大震災)	Taishō Kantō Jishin (Kantō Daishinsai)	Izu Ōshima	
May 23, 1925	6.8 M_{L}	428	1925 North Tajima earthquake	北但馬地震	Kita Tajima Jishin	Toyooka in Hyōgo Prefecture 35.6°N 134.8°E	According to the Japanese government's official report, there were 428 human fatalities, 1,016 people injured, 7,863 buildings destroyed, and 45,659 houses damaged by collapse or fire. This quake caused extensive damage to the town of Toyooka and the Maruyama River area. Just before the shaking could be felt, a sound like a cannon was reportedly heard intermittently from the direction of the estuary near the Maruyama River. During the earthquake, the ground in the town of Tokyooka experienced strong seismic vibrations for 16 seconds. As most of the buildings of the time were wooden, many of them were destroyed at once during the initial earthquake. In the fire that broke out subsequently, half of Toyooka was burned down, with many deaths resulting (a reported 8% of the town's population.) 272 deaths were confirmed to have occurred in the Kinosaki area.
March 7, 1927	7.6 M_{L}	3,020	1927 North Tango earthquake	北丹後地震	Kita Tango Jishin	Tango Peninsula in Kyoto Prefecture	Almost all of the houses in Mineyama (now part of Kyōtango) were destroyed, and the quake was felt as far away as Tokyo and Kagoshima.
November 26, 1930	7.3 M_{s}	272	1930 North Izu earthquake	1930年北伊豆地震	Sen-kyūhyaku-sanjū-nen Kita-Izu Jishin	Izu Peninsula	
March 3, 1933	8.4 M_{w}	3,000+	1933 Sanriku earthquake	昭和三陸地震	Shōwa Sanriku Jishin	290 km (180 mi) east of the city of Kamaishi, Iwate	Kamaishi Bay, Iwate after 1933 earthquake and tsunami
November 3, 1936	7.2 M_{s}	0	1936 Miyagi earthquake	1936年宮城県沖地震	Sen-kyūhyaku-sanjūroku-nen Miyagi-ken-oki Jishin	offshore Miyagi	
August 2, 1940	7.5 M_{w}	10	1940 Shakotan earthquake	1940積丹半島沖地震	Sen-kyūhyaku-yonjū-nen Shakotan-oki Jishin	offshore Hokkaido	
September 10, 1943	7.2 M_{L}	1,083	1943 Tottori earthquake	鳥取地震	Tottori Jishin	offshore from Ketaka District	
December 7, 1944	8.1 M_{w}	1,223	1944 Tōnankai earthquake	昭和東南海地震	Shōwa Tōnankai Jishin	34.0°N 137.1°E	This earthquake occurred on Dec. 7, 1944, at 13:35 local time (04:35 UTC). Its moment magnitude was 8.1 and it was felt with a maximum intensity of 5 on the Shindo scale (or VII, "Severe", on the Mercalli intensity scale). It struck the provinces along the coast of the Tōkai region, causing serious damage and triggering a tsunami. The earthquake and tsunami combined killed 1,223 people, with injuries reported to have affected 20,000 people or more.
January 13, 1945	6.8 M_{L}	1,180 + 1,126 missing	1945 Mikawa earthquake	三河地震	Mikawa Jishin	Mikawa Bay	An earthquake which occurred off Mie and Aichi prefectures, Japan at 03:38 on January 13, 1945.
December 20, 1946	8.1 M_{w}	1,362	1946 Nankai earthquake	昭和南海地震	Shōwa Nankai Jishin	Nankai Trough	A major earthquake in Nankaidō, Japan. Occurred on December 20, 1946, at 19:19 UTC. The earthquake was felt from Northern Honshū to Kyūshū.
June 28, 1948	7.1 M_{w}	3,769	1948 Fukui earthquake	福井地震	Fukui Jishin	near Maruoka, Fukui 36.10°N 136.17°E	A major earthquake in Fukui Prefecture, Japan. It struck at 5:13 p.m. on June 28, 1948 (the then Japan Daylight Saving Time; JDT).
March 4, 1952	8.1 M_{w}	28	1952 Hokkaido earthquake	1952年十勝沖地震	Sen-kyūhyaku-goūjūni-nen Tokachi-oki Jishin	42.3°N 144.9°E	The 1952 Hokkaido earthquake took place around March 4, 1952 in the sea east of Hokkaido. On the Moment magnitude scale, it measured 8.1. Casualties occurred due to the earthquake.
August 19, 1961	7.0	8	1961 North Mino earthquake	北美濃地震	Kitamino Jishin	36°6′7″N 136°42′0″E	One of the earthquakes that the Japan Meteorological Agency named for the. 8 people dead.
June 16, 1964	7.6 M_{w}	26	1964 Niigata earthquake	新潟地震	Niigata Jishin	50 km north of Niigata	The earthquake caused widespread soil liquefaction in the city of Niigata, resulting in unusually high levels of damage to buildings for the felt intensity.
April 1, 1968	7.5 M_{w}	0	1968 Hyūga-nada earthquake	1968年日向灘地震	Sen-kyūhyaku-rokujūhachi-nen Hyūga-nada Jishin	Hyūga-nada Sea	
May 16, 1968	8.2 M_{w}	52	1968 Tokachi earthquake	1968年十勝沖地震	Sen-kyūhyaku-rokujūhachi-nen Tokachi-oki Jishin	Offshore of Misawa, Japan	This earthquake struck off the coast of Honshu Island, near Misawa Japan, Aomori Prefecture, and was followed by a significant tsunami. The earthquake and ensuing tsunami claimed 52 lives and resulted in significant material damage in Northern Japan.
June 17, 1973	7.8 M_{w}	0	1973 Nemuro earthquake	1973根室半島沖地震	Sen-kyūhyaku-nanajūsan-nen Nemurohantō-oki Jishin	near Nemuro Peninsula	
May 9, 1974	6.5 M_{s}	25	1974 Izu Peninsula earthquake	1974年伊豆半島沖地震	Sen-kyūhyaku-nanajūyo-nen Izu-hantō-oki Jishin	near Izu Peninsula	
June 12, 1978	7.7 M_{s}	28	1978 Miyagi earthquake	宮城県沖地震	Miyagi-ken-oki jishin	just offshore Miyagi Prefecture	Damage was greatest around Sendai, and the earthquake triggered widespread landslides.
May 26, 1983	7.8 M_{s}	104	1983 Sea of Japan earthquake	日本海中部地震	Nihonkai-chubu jishin	off coast 50 miles (80 kilometers)from Noshiro, Akita Prefecture	Rising up to 9.1 m (30 ft) above the coastline, the tsunami created by this earthquake was observed throughout a wide area along the Sea of Japan's coast and caused damage from Tsuruoka to Goshogawara. 100 people lost their lives to the tsunami, including seawall construction workers and beachgoers. In total, 104 people were killed. Soil liquification was widely observed through the affected area.
September 14, 1984	6.3 M_{s}	29	1984 Nagano earthquake	長野県西部地震	Nagano-ken-seibu jishin	Mount Ontake, Otaki, Nagano Prefecture	Overall, 29 people were killed and 10 injured.
December 17, 1987	6.7 M_{w}	2	1987 Chiba earthquake	千葉県東方沖地震	Chiba-ken Tōhō-oki jishin	2 people killed and 146 injured.	
January 15, 1993	7.6 M_{w}	2	1993 Kushiro earthquake	釧路沖地震	Kushiro-Oki Jishin	43.000°N 143.691°E	
July 12, 1993	7.7 M_{w}	202	1993 Hokkaidō earthquake	北海道南西沖地震	Hokkaidō Nansei Oki Jishin	42.851°N 139.197°E	
December 28, 1994	7.7 M_{w}	3	1994 offshore Sanriku earthquake	三陸はるか沖地震	Sanriku-haruka-oki Jishin	40.451°N 143.491°E	
January 17, 1995	7.3 M_{j}	6,434	Great Hanshin earthquake	兵庫県南部地震 (阪神・淡路大震災)	Hyōgoken Nanbu Jishin (Hanshin-Awaji Daishinsai )	northern end of Awaji Island	Damage in Kobe An earthquake in Japan that occurred on Tuesday January 17, 1995 at 05:46 JST in the southern part of Hyōgo Prefecture. It measured M_{w} 6.8 on the Moment magnitude scale (USGS), and Mj7.3 on the revised (7.2 on the old) JMA magnitude scale. The tremors lasted for approximately 20 seconds. The hypocenter of the earthquake was located 16 km (9.9 mi) beneath its epicenter, on the northern end of Awaji Island, 20 km (12 mi) away from the city of Kobe.
May 4, 1998	7.5 M_{w}	0	1998 Ryukyu Islands earthquake	石垣島南方沖地震	Ishigakijima nanpō-oki jishin	22.30°N 125.30°E	The epicentre was in the Philippine Sea, far off the coast (260 km from Ishigaki Island, Japan, 400 km from Basco, Philippines, and 425 km from Hualien, Taiwan).
March 24, 2001	6.7 M_{w}	2	2001 Geiyo earthquake	2001年芸予地震	Nisen-ichi-nen Gēyo Jishin	34.083°N 128.020°E	
September 25, 2003	8.3 M_{w}	1	2003 Tokachi earthquake	2003年十勝沖地震	Nisen-san-nen Tokachi-oki Jishin	41.78°N 143.86°E	An earthquake occurring in Hokkaido on September 25, 2003. It measured 8.3 on the Moment magnitude scale and caused extensive damage to roads all around Hokkaido, several power outages, and landslides which resulted in further damage.
October 23, 2004	6.6 M_{w}	68	2004 Chūetsu earthquake	新潟県中越地震	Chūetsu Jishin	Ojiya, Niigata	Occurred at 5:56 p.m. (local time) on Saturday, October 23, 2004. The initial earthquake caused noticeable shaking across almost half of Honshū, including parts of the Tohoku, Hokuriku, Chūbu, and Kantō regions.
March 20, 2005	7.0 M_{w}	1	2005 Fukuoka earthquake	福岡県西方沖地震	Fukuoka-ken Seihō Oki Jishin	In the Genkai Sea about 6 km (3.7 mi) northwest of Genkai Island at the mouth of Fukuoka Harbor	This earthquake struck Fukuoka Prefecture, Japan at 10:53:40 JST on March 20 and lasted for approximately 50 seconds.
August 16, 2005	7.2 M_{w}	0	2005 Miyagi earthquake	宮城県沖地震	Miyagi-ken Oki Jishin	about 55 km (34 mi) due east of the Oshika Peninsula in Miyagi Prefecture	
November 15, 2006	8.3 M_{w}	0	2006 Kuril Islands earthquake	2006年千島列島沖地震	Nisen-roku-nen Chishima Rettō Oki Jishin	about 160 km (99 mi) due east of the southern tip of Simushir in the Kuril Islands	The earthquake happened at 20:29 JST on November 15, 2006, causing a tsunami to hit the Japanese northern coast.
January 13, 2007	8.1 M_{w}	0	2007 Kuril Islands earthquake	2007年千島列島沖地震	Nisen-nana-nen Chishima Rettō Oki Jishin	46°28.8′N 154°04.48′E	The earthquake happened at 1:23 p.m. JST (04:23 UTC) and resulted in a tsunami warning but did not cause significant damage. The epicentre was located 95 km to the south east of the 2006 Kuril Islands earthquake that struck a few weeks earlier.
March 25, 2007	6.9 M_{w}	1	2007 Noto earthquake	能登半島地震	Noto Hantō Jishin	about 11 km (6.8 mi) due west of the southern end of the town of Wajima	
July 16, 2007	6.6 M_{w}	11	2007 Chūetsu offshore earthquake	新潟県中越沖地震	Niigata-ken Chūetsu Oki Jishin	about 29 km (18 mi) west of Niigata	The earthquake) was a powerful magnitude 6.6 earthquake that occurred 10:13 a.m. local time (01:13 UTC) on July 16, 2007, in the northwest Niigata region of Japan. Eleven deaths and at least 1,000 injuries have been reported, and 342 buildings were completely destroyed, mostly older wooden structures.
June 14, 2008	6.9 M_{w}	12	2008 Iwate–Miyagi Nairiku earthquake	岩手・宮城内陸地震	Iwate Miyagi Nairiku Jishin	about 1 km (0.62 mi) east of Narusawa Onsen in northwest Iwate Prefecture	This earthquake struck the central Tōhoku region, in northeastern Honshū, Japan.
August 11, 2009	6.6 M_{w}	1	2009 Shizuoka earthquake	駿河湾地震	Suruga-wan Jishin	33.8°N 138.50°E, depth 20.0 km	
February 26, 2010	7.0 M_{w}	1	Ryūkyū Islands earthquake	沖縄本島近海地震	Okinawa-hontō-kinkai Jishin	25.902°N 128.417°E, depth 22.0 km	
December 21, 2010	7.4 M_{w}	0	Bonin Islands earthquake	父島近海地震	Chichijima-kinkai Jishin	26.866°N 143.739°E, depth 14.9 km	
March 9, 2011	7.2 M_{w}	0	2011 Tōhoku earthquake foreshock	東北地方太平洋沖地震(Foreshock) (東日本大震災)	Tōhokuchihō Taiheiyō Oki Jishin (Higashi Nihon Dai-Shinsai)	38.424°N 142.836°E, depth 32 km	
March 11, 2011; 05:46:23 UTC (14:46 JST)	9.1 M_{w}	19,759 deaths, (2,553 missing)	2011 Tōhoku earthquake	東北地方太平洋沖地震 (東日本大震災)	Tōhokuchihō Taiheiyō Oki Jishin (Higashi Nihon Dai-Shinsai)	38.510°N 142.792°E, depth 29 km	Damage in Sendai This megathrust earthquake's hypocenter was reported to be off the Oshika Peninsula, the east coast of Tōhoku It was the strongest to hit Japan and one of the top five largest earthquakes in the world since seismological record-keeping began. It was followed by a tsunami with waves of up to 40 m (130 ft) along the Sanriku coast. The disaster left thousands dead and inflicted extensive material damage to buildings and infrastructure that led to significant accidents at four major nuclear power stations.
March 11, 2011; 06:25:50 UTC	7.1 M_{w}	0	2011 Tōhoku earthquake aftershock	東北地方太平洋沖地震(Aftershock) (東日本大震災)	Tōhokuchihō Taiheiyō Oki Jishin (Higashi Nihon Dai-Shinsai)	38.106°N 144.553°E, depth 19.7 km	
April 7, 2011; 23:32:44 JST	7.1 M_{w}	4	April 2011 Miyagi earthquake	宮城県沖地震	Miyagi-ken Oki Jishin	38.253°N 141.640°E, depth 49 km	
April 11, 2011; 17:16:13 JST	6.6 M_{w}	6	April 2011 Fukushima earthquake	福島県浜通り地震	Fukushima-ken Hamadori Jishin	37.007°N 140.477°E, depth 10 km	
July 10, 2011; 10:57:12 JST	7.0 M_{w}	0	2011 Tōhoku earthquake aftershock	福島県浜通り地震	Fukushima-ken Hamadori Jishin	38.040°N 143.287°E, depth 49 km	Quake was centered c. 242 km SW of Hachijo-jima
January 1, 2012; 14:27:54 JST	6.8 M_{w}	0	Izu Islands, Japan	鳥島近海地震	Torishima-kinkai Jishin	31.416°N 138.155°E, depth 348.5 km	242 km (150 miles) SW of Hachijo-jima, Izu Islands, Japan 365 km (226 miles) S of Hamamatsu, Honshu, Japan
December 7, 2012; 17:18:24 JST	7.3 M_{w}	3	2012 Sanriku earthquake	三陸沖地震	Sanriku Oki Jishin	37.700°N 144.600°E, depth 32.0 km	293 km (182 miles) SE of Kamaishi, Japan; 492 km (306 miles) ENE of Tokyo, Japan
October 26, 2013; 02:10:19 JST	7.1 M_{w}	0	Off the east coast of Honshu	福島県沖地震	Fukushima-ken oki jishin	37.156°N 144.661°E, 35.0 km depth	
November 22, 2014 22:08:18 JST	6.2 M_{w} 6.7 M_{JMA}	0	2014 Nagano earthquake	長野県地震	Nagano-ken jishin	36.641°N 137.888°E 9.0 km depth	The earthquake injured 41 people and affected the entire Chubu region. The quake also generated many surface ruptures, mostly near Hakuba Village.
May 30, 2015; 20:23:02 JST	7.8 M_{w}	0	2015 Ogasawara earthquake	小笠原諸島西方沖地震	Ogasawara-shoto Seihō-Oki Jishin	27.831°N 140.493°E, depth 677.6 km	189 km (117 mi) WNW of Chichijima, Japan
April 14, 2016; 21:26:39 JST	6.2 M_{w}	9	2016 Kumamoto earthquakes	平成28年（2016年）熊本地震	Heisei-28-nen (2016-nen) Kumamoto jishin	depth 10.0 km	7 km (4.34 miles) SW of Ueki, Kumamoto Prefecture, Japan
April 16, 2016; 01:25:06 JST	7.0 M_{w}	273	2016 Kumamoto earthquakes	平成28年（2016年）熊本地震	Heisei-28-nen (2016-nen) Kumamoto jishin	32.791°N 130.754°E, depth 10.0 km	1 km (0.62 miles) E of Kumamoto, Japan
November 22, 2016; 05:59:49 JST	6.9 M_{w}	0	2016 Fukushima earthquake	福島県沖地震	Fukushima-ken oki jishin	37.392°N 141.403°E, 11.4 km depth	37 km ESE of Namie, Fukushima
June 18, 2018 07:58:35 JST	5.5 M_{w}	4	2018 Osaka earthquake	大阪府北部地震	Ōsaka-fu Hokubu Jishin	34.834°N 135.606°E, 13.2 km depth	2 km NNW of Hirakata, Osaka
September 6, 2018 03:07:59 JST	6.6 M_{w}	41	2018 Hokkaido Eastern Iburi earthquake	北海道胆振東部地震	Hokkaido Iburi Tōbu Jishin	42.671°N 141.933°E, 33.4 km depth	27 km E of Tomakomai, Hokkaido, Japan
June 18, 2019; 22:22:19 JST	6.4 M_{w}	0	2019 Yamagata earthquake	山形県沖地震	Yamagata-ken Oki jishin	38.635°N 139.4543°E, 16.1 km depth	33 km WSW of Tsuruoka
February 13, 2021; 23:07:49 JST	7.1 M_{w}	1	2021 Fukushima earthquake	福島県沖地震	Fukushima-ken Oki Jishin	37.702°N 141.762°E 55 km depth	2 km ENE of Ishinomaki
March 20, 2021; 18:09:45 JST	7.0 M_{w}	0	March 2021 Miyagi earthquake	宮城県沖地震	Miyagi-ken Oki Jishin	38.475°N 141.607°E 54 km depth	27 km ENE of Ishinomaki
October 7, 2021; 22:41:24 JST	5.9 M_{W}	0	2021 Chiba earthquake	千葉県北西部地震	Chiba-ken Hokuseibu Jishin	35.577°N 140.070°E 80 km depth	4 km SW of Chiba
March 16, 2022; 23:36:30 JST	7.3 M_{W}	4	2022 Fukushima earthquake	福島県沖地震	Fukushima-ken-Oki Jishin (Off the coast of Fukushima Prefecture)	37.702°N 141.587°E 63.1 km depth	57 km ENE of Namie
May 5, 2023; 14:42:04 JST	6.2 M_{w}	1	2023 Noto earthquake	奥能登地震	Notohanto-Oki jishin (Off the Noto Peninsula Earthquake)	37.540°N 137.305°E 8.7 km depth	49 km NE of Anamizu
January 1, 2024; 16:10:09 JST	7.5 M_{w}	732	2024 Noto earthquake	令和6年（2024年）能登半島地震	Reiwa 6-nen (2024-nen) Noto-hanto Jishin	37.498°N 137.242°E 10.0 km depth	42 km NE of Anamizu
August 8, 2024; 16:42:55 JST	7.1 M_{w}	0	2024 Hyūga-nada earthquake	日向灘地震	Hyūga-nada Jishin	31.719°N 131.527°E 25.0 km depth	25 km NE of Nichinan
December 8, 2025	7.6 M_{w}	0	2025 Aomori earthquake	青森県東方沖地震	Aomori-ken Tōhō-Oki Jishin	41.043°N 142.141°E 44.1 km depth	74.5 km ENE of Misawa
April 20, 2026	7.4–7.5 M_{w}	0	2026 Sanriku earthquake			39.953°N 143.046°W 35.0 km depth	100 km ENE of Miyako
July 28, 2026	6.8 M_{w}	34	2026 Kumamoto earthquake	令和8年（2026年）熊本県地震	Reiwa 8-nen (2026-nen) Kumamoto-ken Jishin	32.682°N 130.722°E 10.0 km depth	5 km E of Uto

=== Strongest earthquakes by prefecture (since 1900) ===
Prefecture	Date	Magnitudes		Intensities		Casualties	Article	Citations
Prefecture	Date	(M_{w})	(M_{JMA})	MMI	JMA	Casualties	Article	Citations
Aichi	12 January 1945	6.6	6.8	VII	7	1,180 dead, 3,866 injured, 1,126 missing	1945 Mikawa earthquake	
Akita	26 May 1983	7.8	7.7	VIII	5	104 dead, 324 injured	1983 Sea of Japan earthquake	
Aomori	9 March 1931	7.9	7.2	VII	4	-	-	
Chiba	2 September 1923	7.9	7.3	VII	5	-	1923 Great Kantō earthquake (aftershock)	
Ehime	5 August 1968	6.8	6.6	VII	5	-	-	
Fukui	28 June 1948	6.8	7.1	IX	7	3,769 dead, 22,203 injured	1948 Fukui earthquake	
Fukuoka	20 March 2005	6.6	7.0	VIII	6-	1 dead, 1,200 injured	2005 Fukuoka earthquake	
Fukushima	5 November 1938	7.8	7.5	VI	5	1 dead	-	
Gifu	14 August 1909	6.9	N/A	N/A	6	41 dead, 774 injured	1909 Anegawa earthquake	
Gunma	25 February 2013	5.8	6.3	VIII	5+	-	-	
Hiroshima	24 March 2001	6.8	6.7	IX	6-	2 dead, 288 injured	2001 Geiyo earthquake	
Hokkaido	25 September 2003	8.3	8.0	IX	6-	1 dead, 850 injured, 2 missing	2003 Tokachi earthquake	
Hyōgo	16 January 1995	6.9	7.3	XII	7	6,634 dead, 43,792 injured	Great Hanshin earthquake	
Ibaraki	11 March 2011	7.9	7.6	VIII	6+	-	2011 Tōhoku earthquake (aftershock)	
Ishikawa	1 January 2024	7.5	7.6	XI	7	703 dead, 1,394 injured	2024 Noto earthquake	
Iwate	20 March 1960	8.0	7.2	VI	4	-	-	
Kagawa	26 May 2005	4.8	4.7	N/A	3	-	-	
Kagoshima	15 June 1911	7.9	8.1	VII	N/A	12 dead	1911 Kikai Island earthquake	
Kanagawa	1 September 1923	8.0-8.2	7.9	XI	7	142,800 dead	1923 Great Kantō earthquake	
Kōchi	11 December 1968	5.5	5.6	N/A	3	-	-	
Kumamoto	15 April 2016	7.0	7.3	IX	7	277 dead, 2,899 injured	2016 Kumamoto earthquakes	
Kyōto	7 March 1927	7.0	7.3	VII	6	2,956 dead, 7,806 injured	1927 North Tango earthquake	
Mie	7 December 1944	8.1-8.2	7.9	VIII	6	1,223 dead, 2,135 injured	1944 Tōnankai earthquake	
Miyagi	11 March 2011	9.1	9.0	IX	7	19,759 dead, 6,242 injured, 2,553 missing	2011 Tōhoku earthquake and tsunami	

== Gallery ==
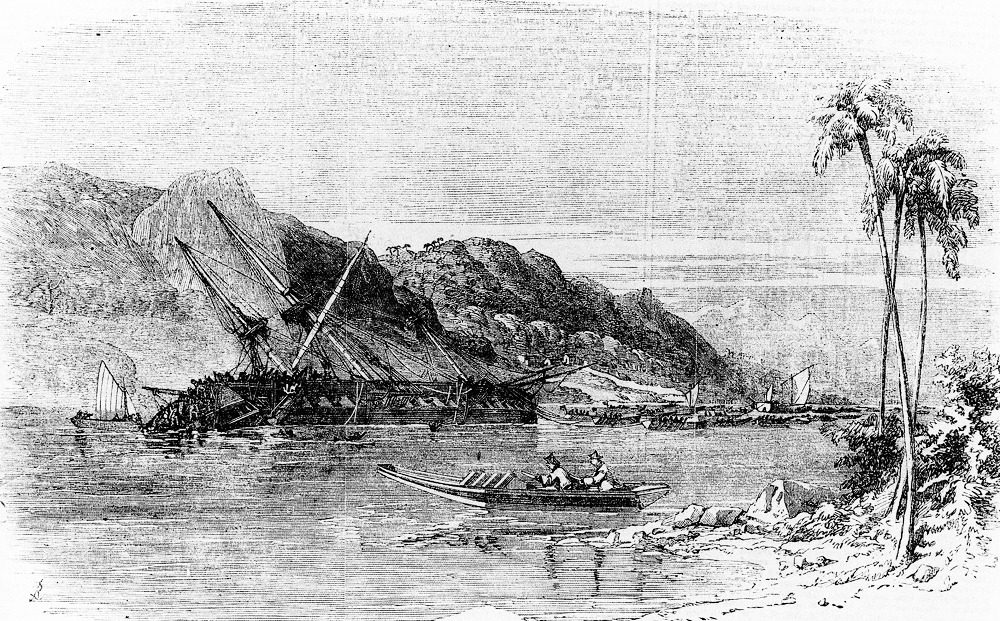
1854 Tōkai earthquake

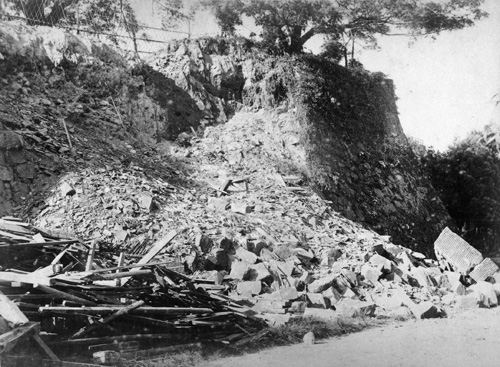
1889 Kumamoto earthquake

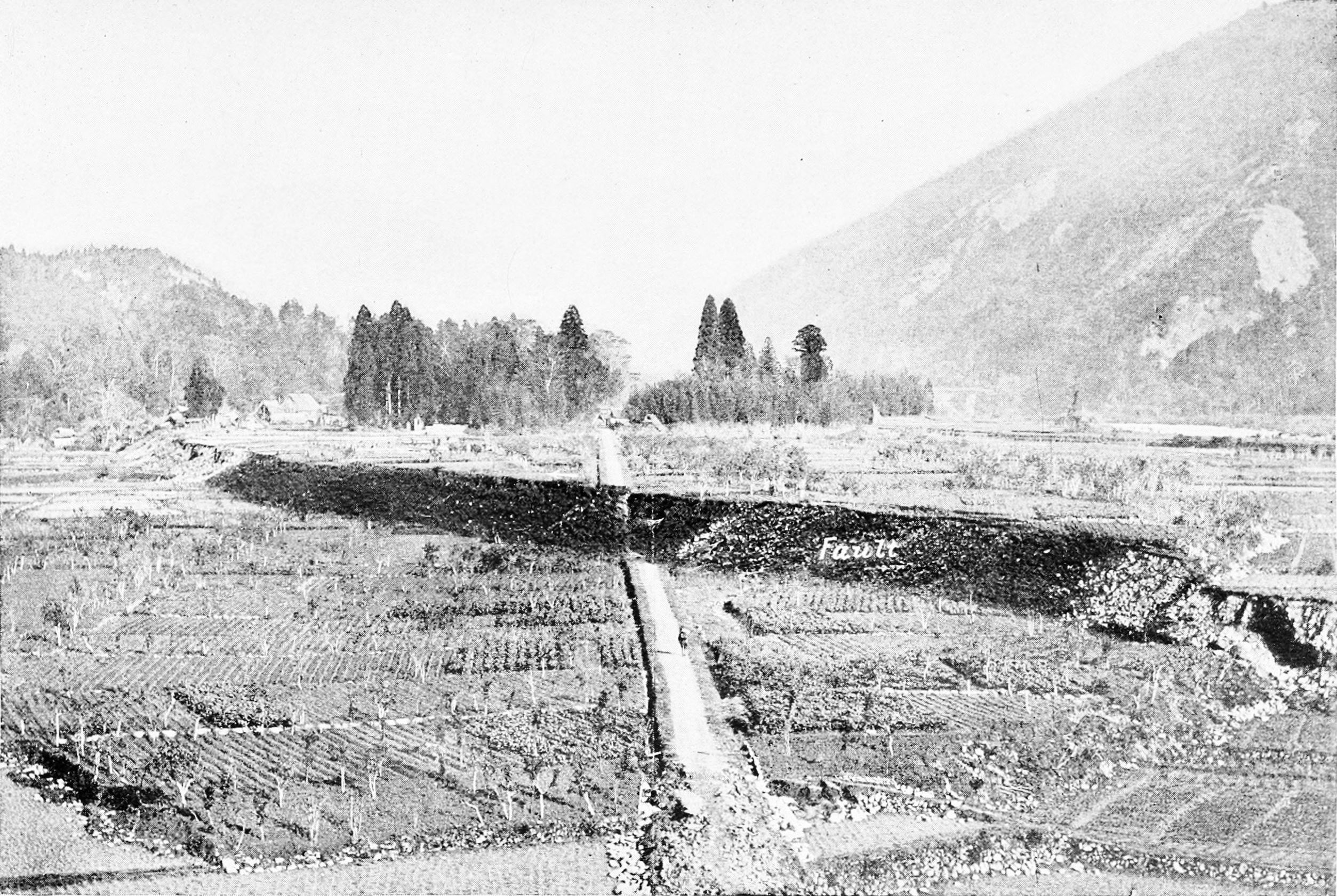
1891 Mino–Owari earthquake

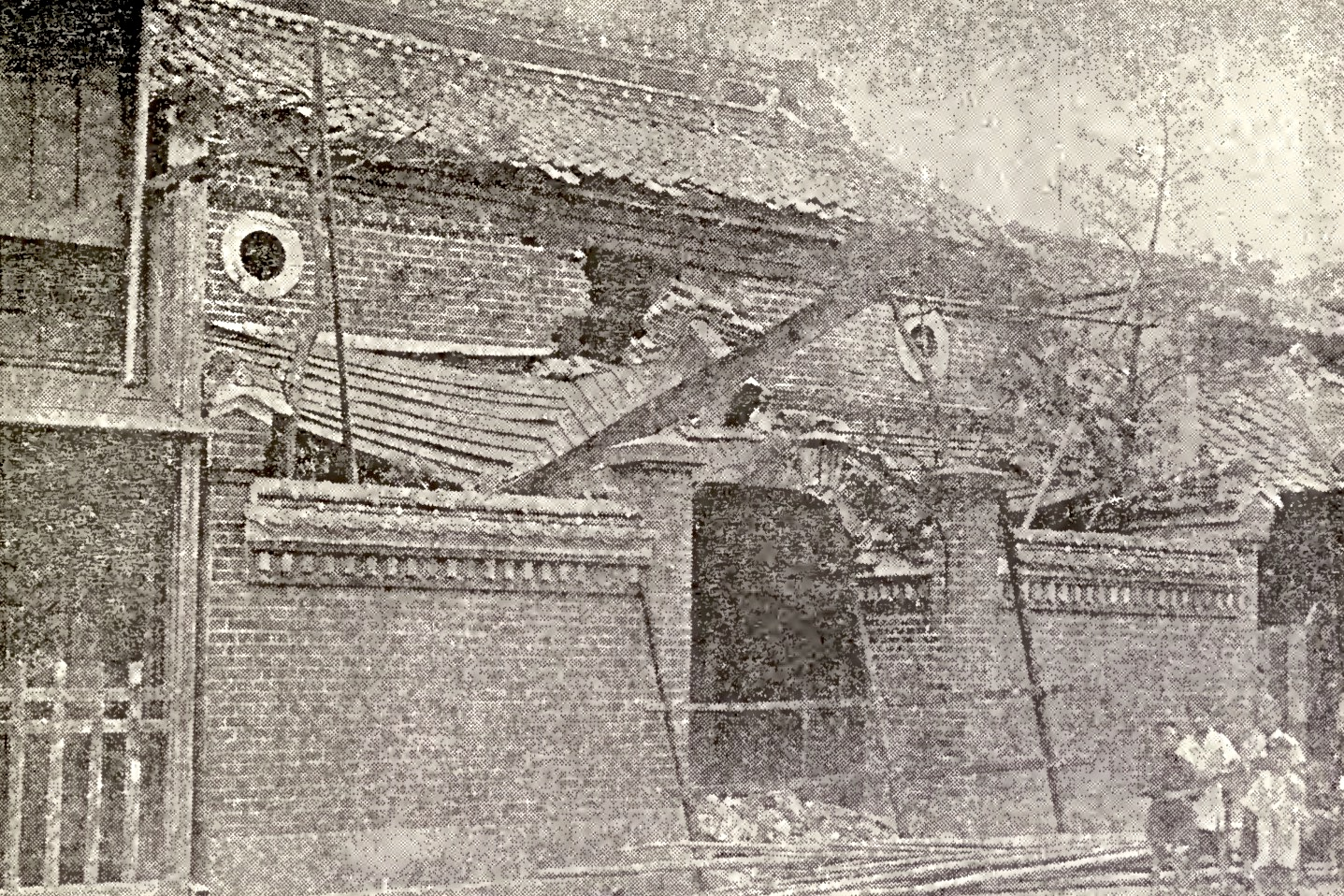
1894 Tokyo earthquake

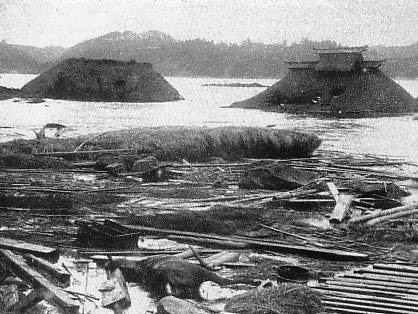
1896 Sanriku earthquake

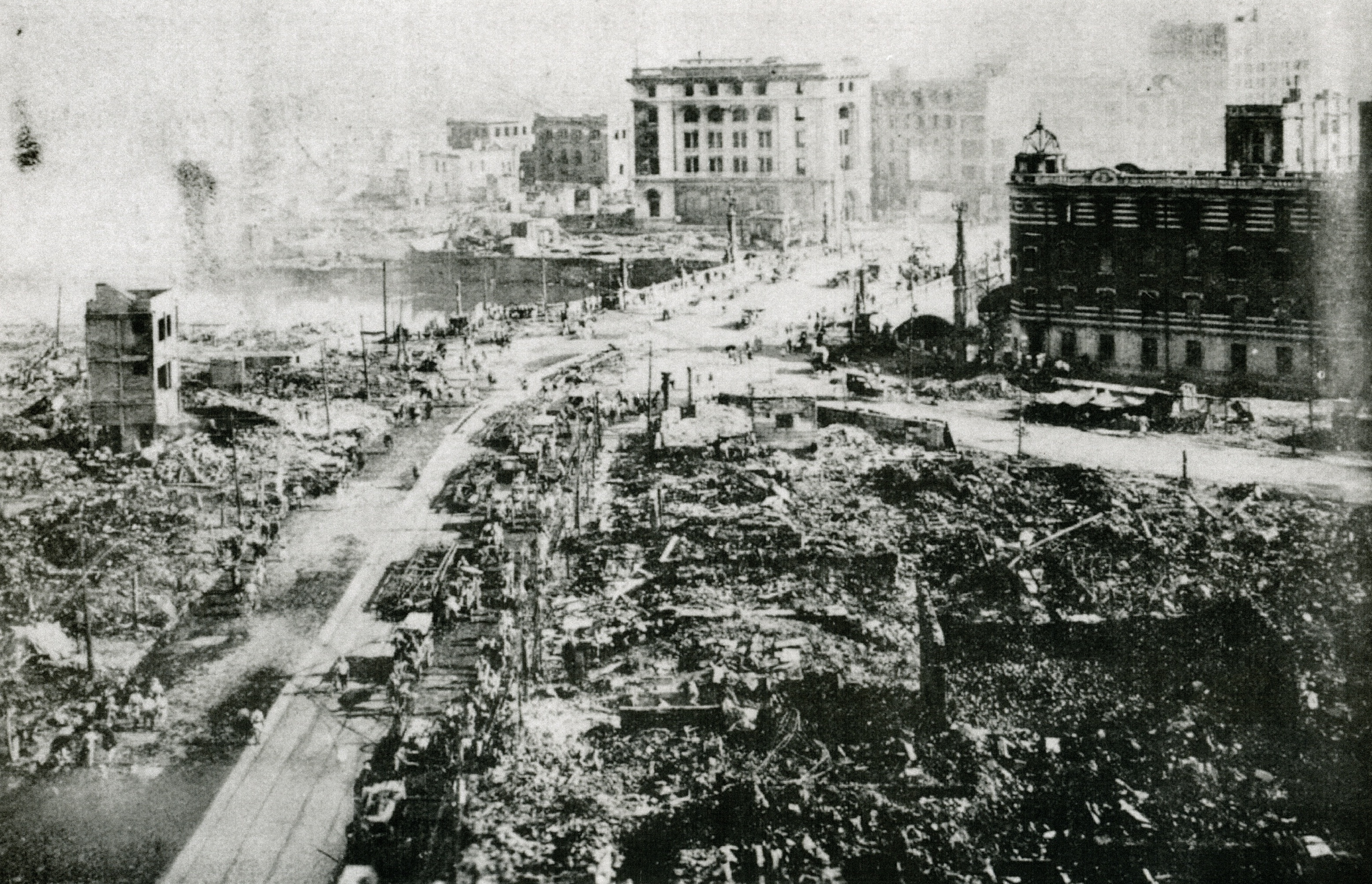
Great Kantō Earthquake

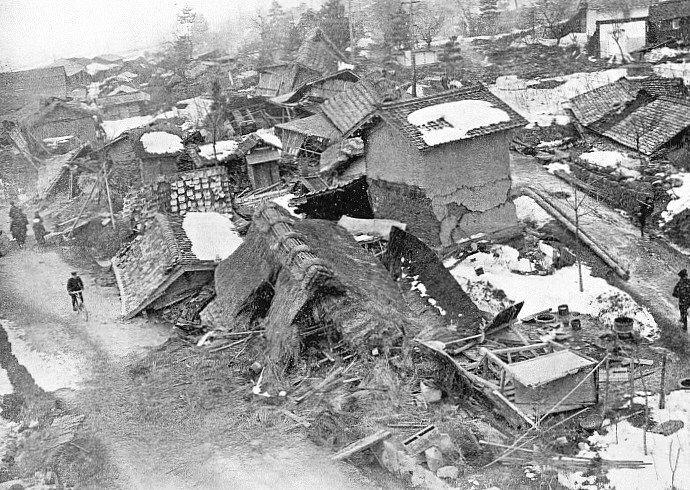
1927 North Tango earthquake

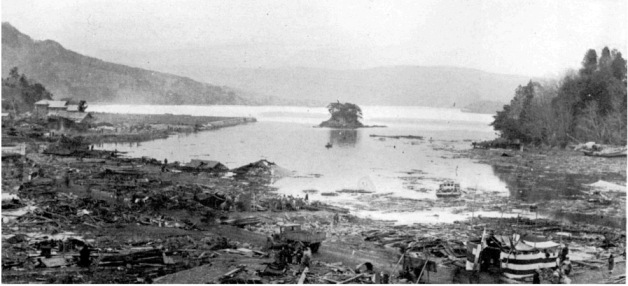
1933 Sanriku earthquake

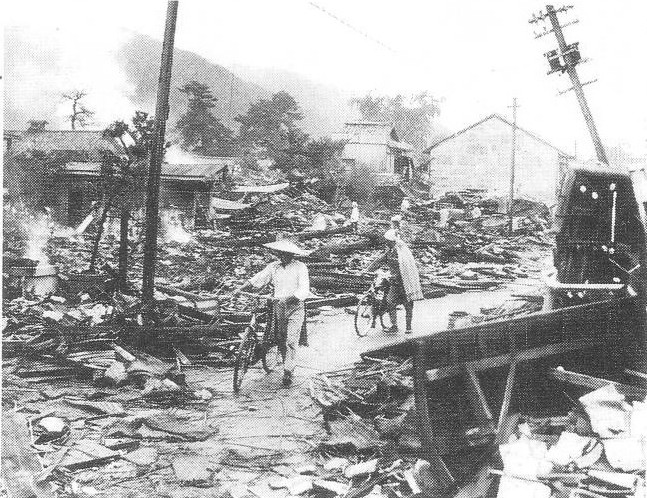
1943 Tottori earthquake

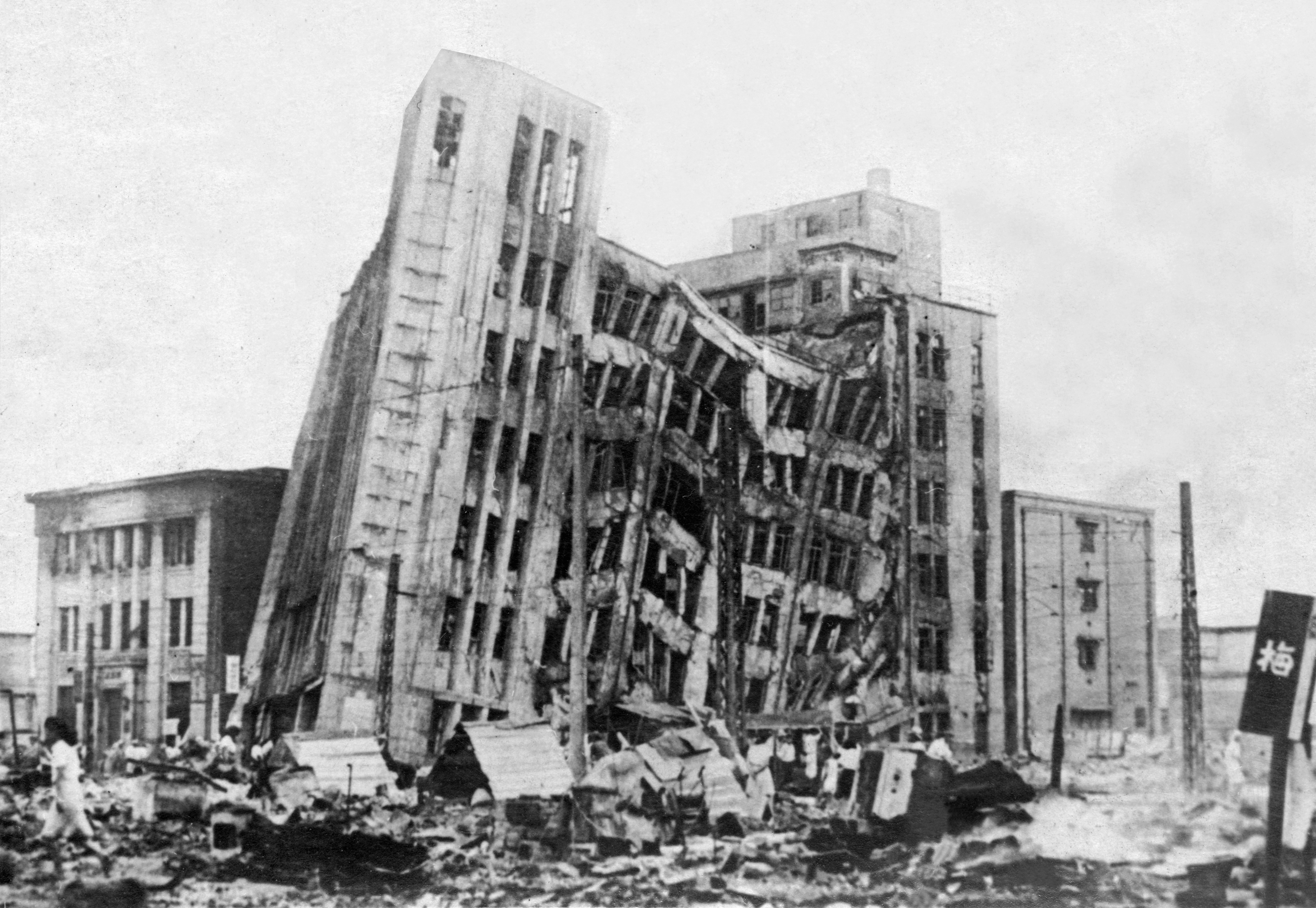
1948 Fukui earthquake

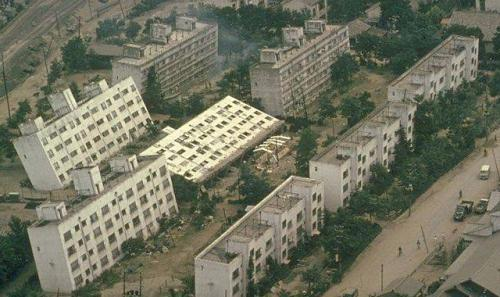
1964 Niigata earthquake

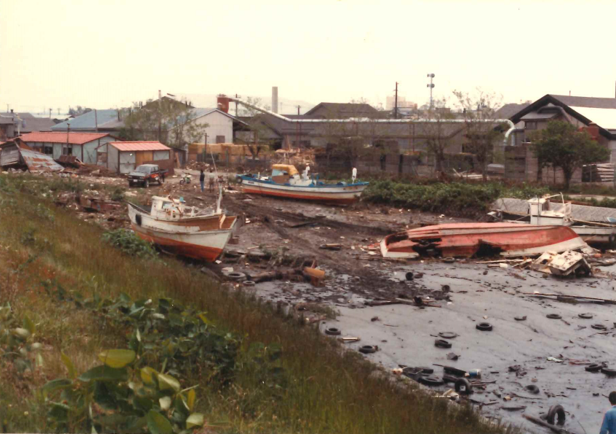
1983 Sea of Japan earthquake

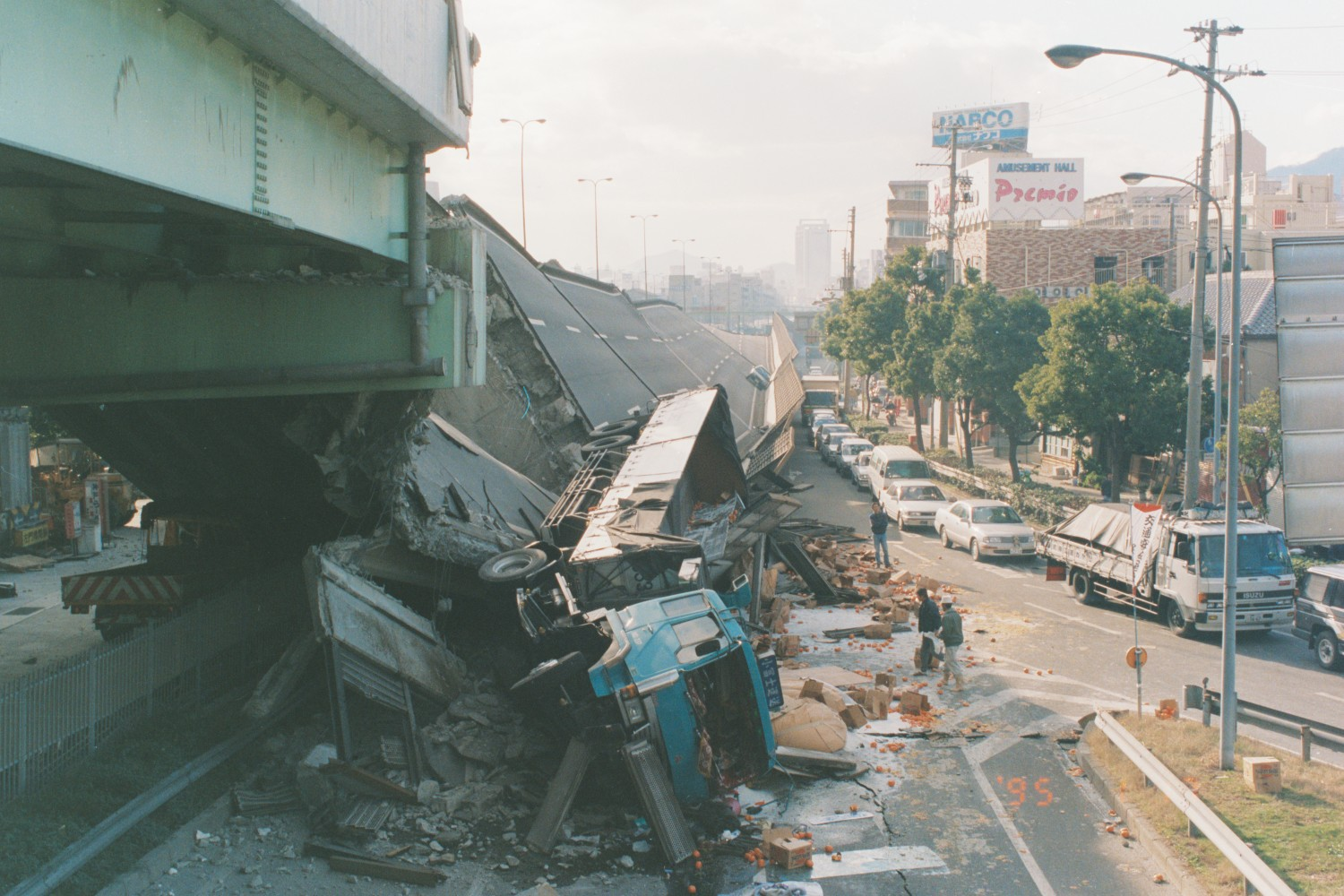
Kobe earthquake

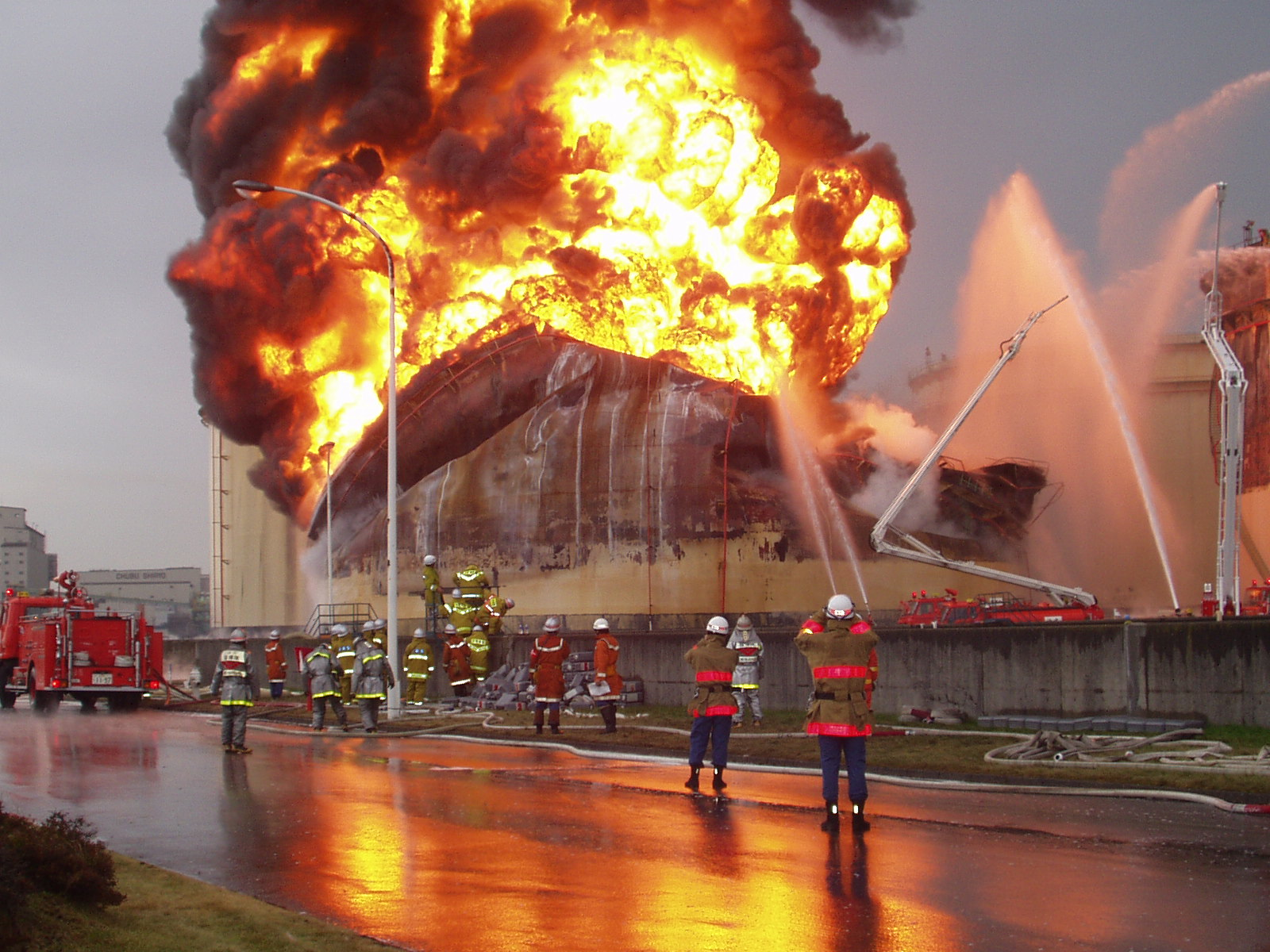
2003 Tokachi earthquake

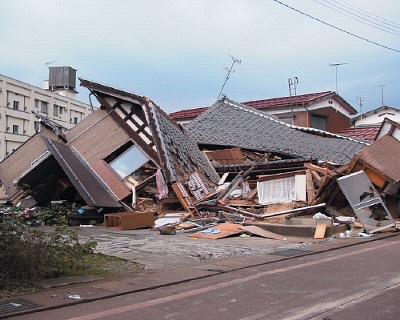
2004 Chūetsu earthquake

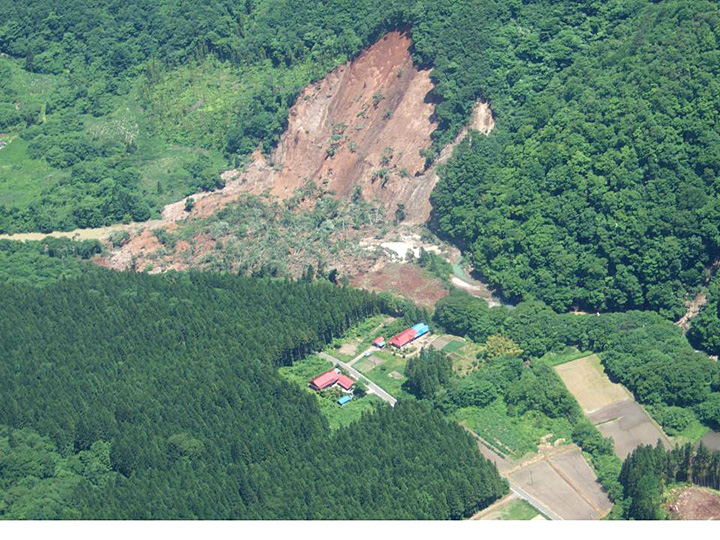
2008 Iwate–Miyagi Nairiku earthquake

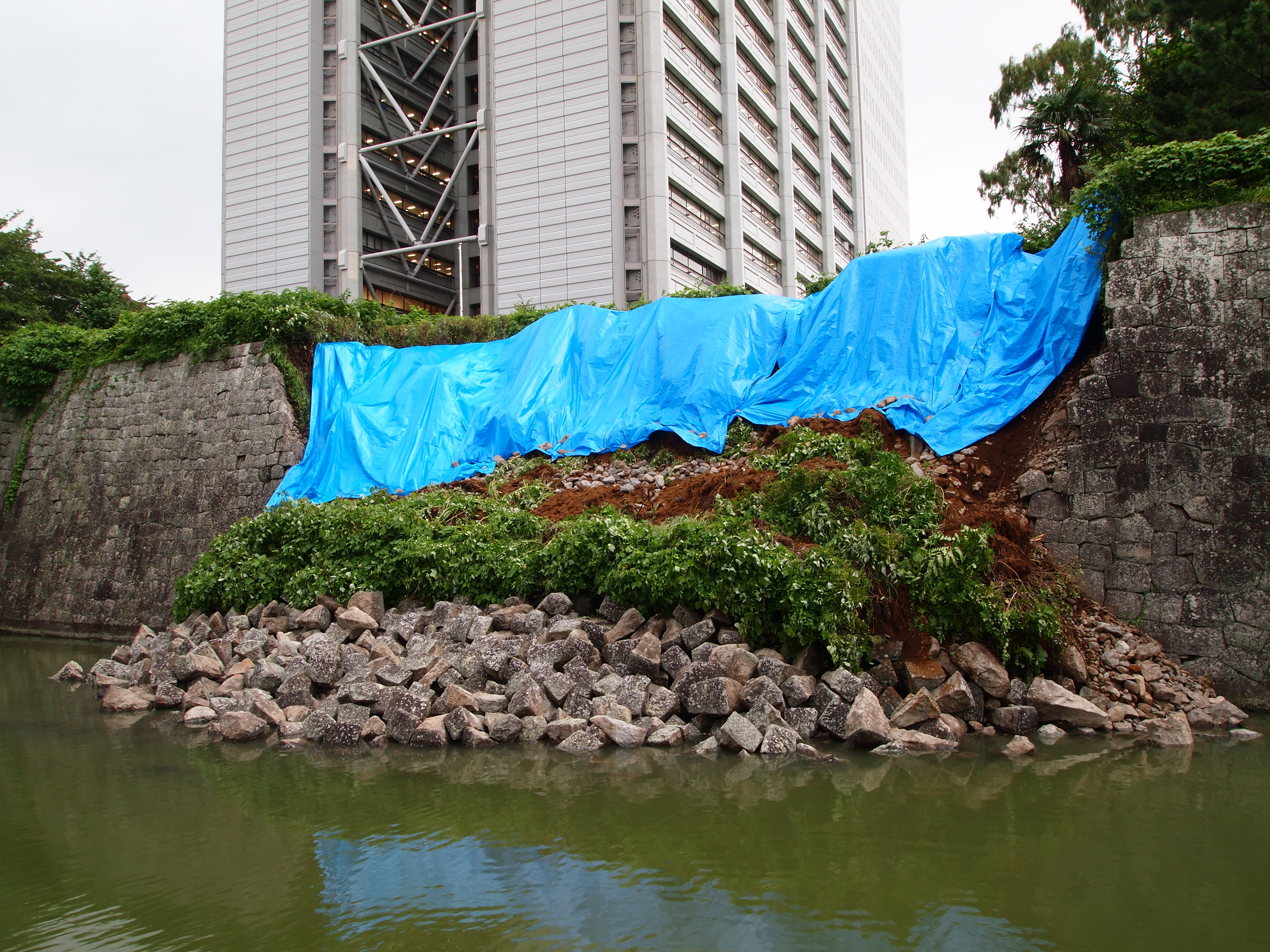
2009 Shizuoka earthquake

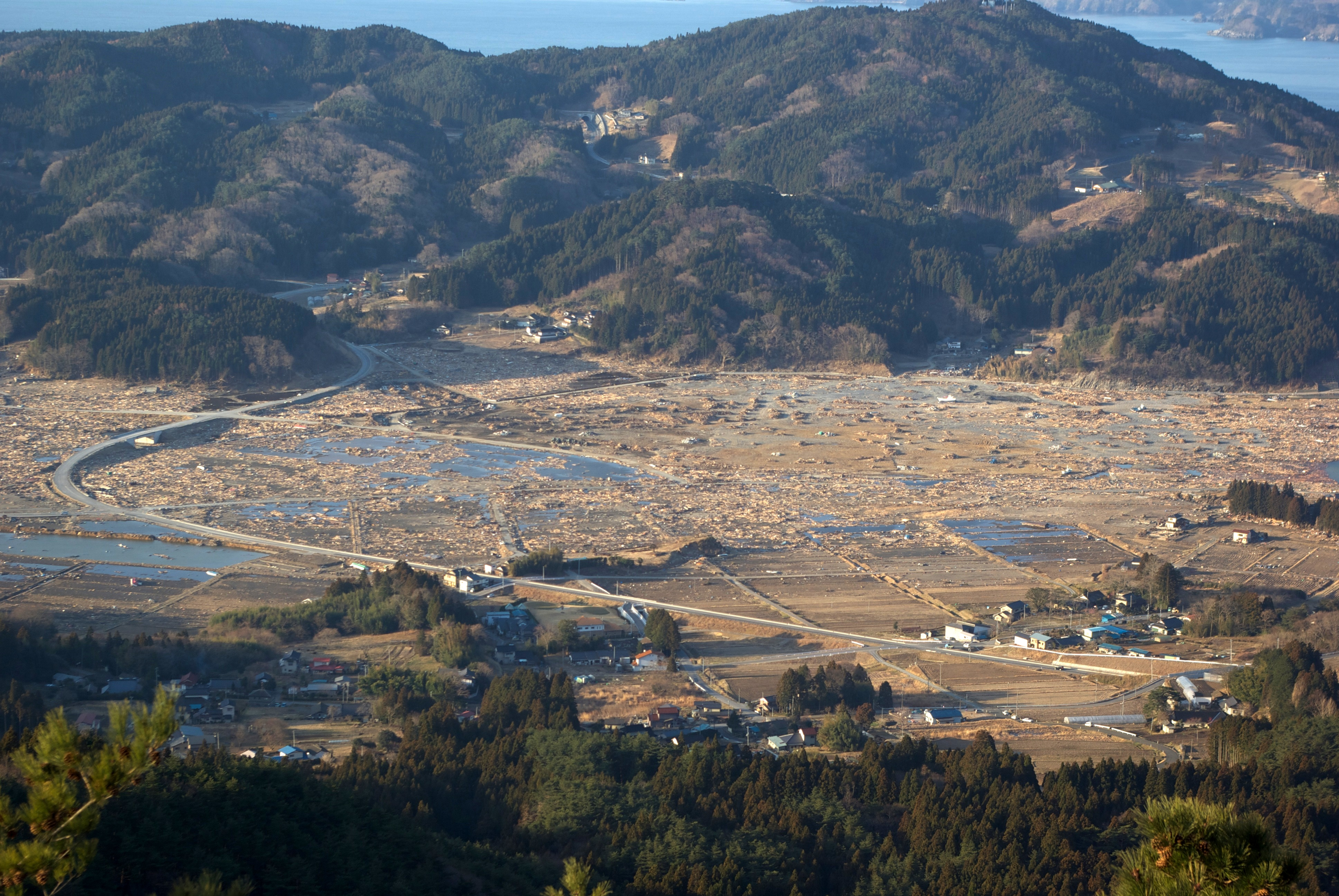
2011 Tōhoku earthquake and tsunami

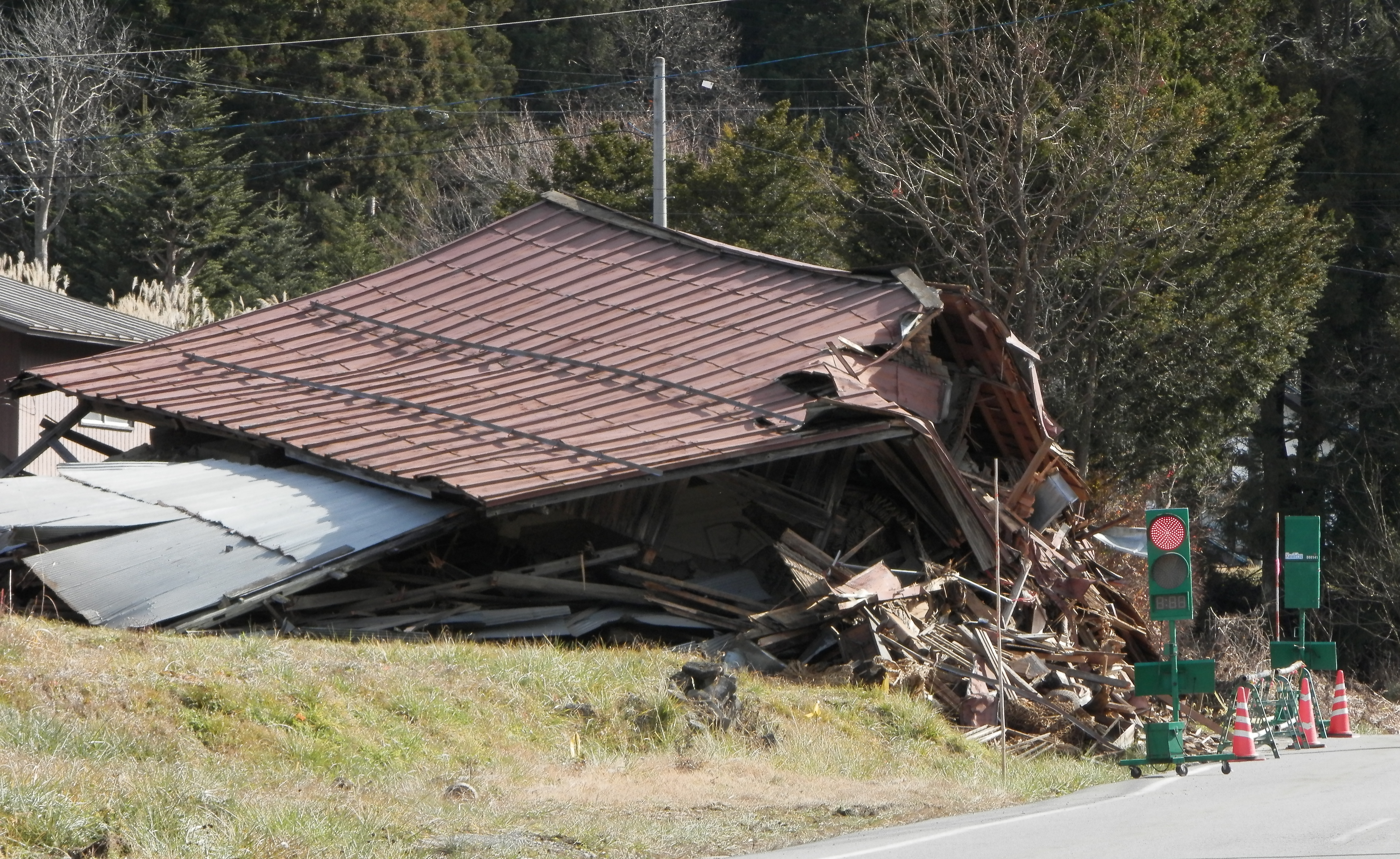
2014 Nagano earthquake

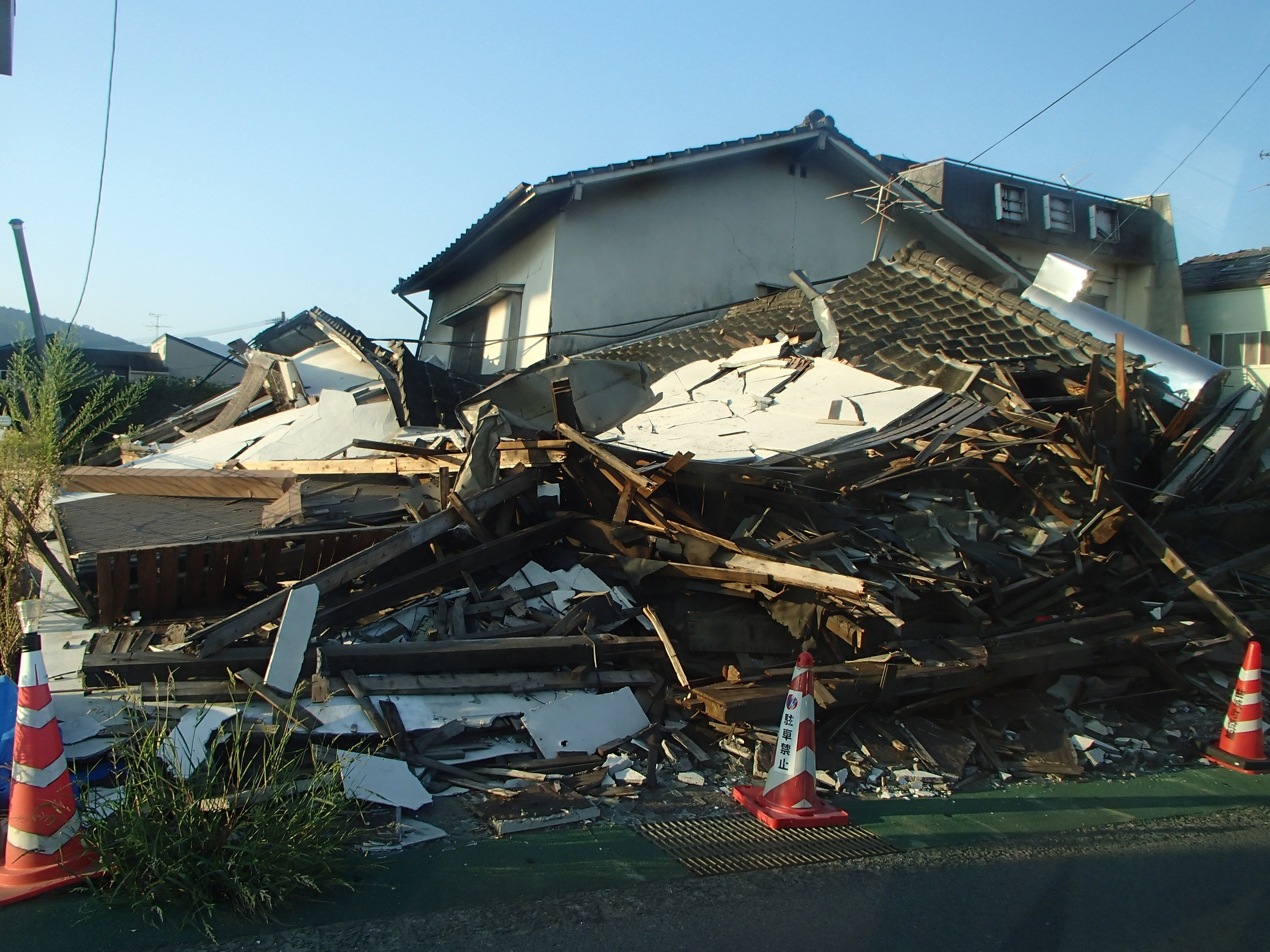
2016 Kumamoto earthquakes

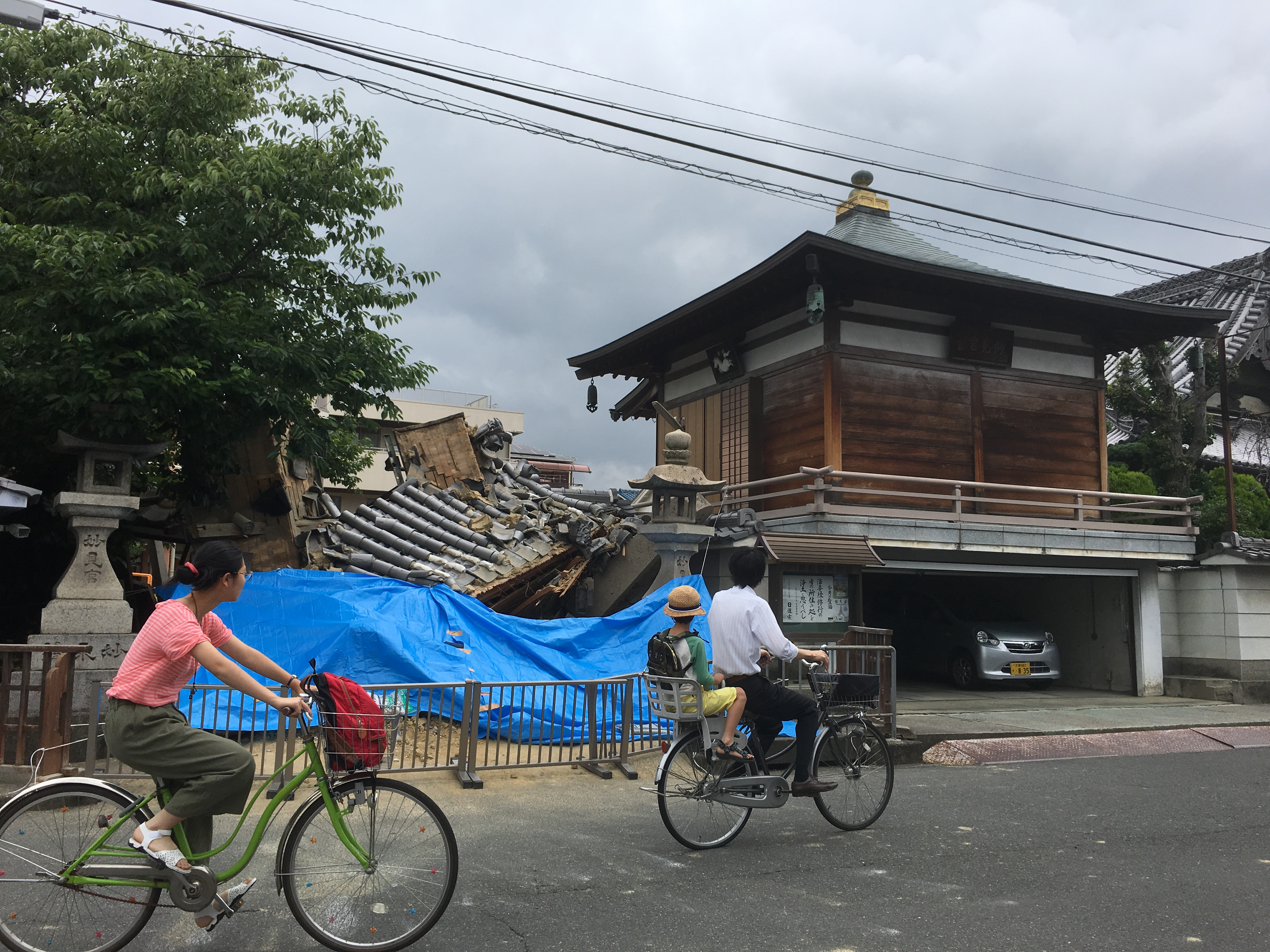
2018 Osaka earthquake

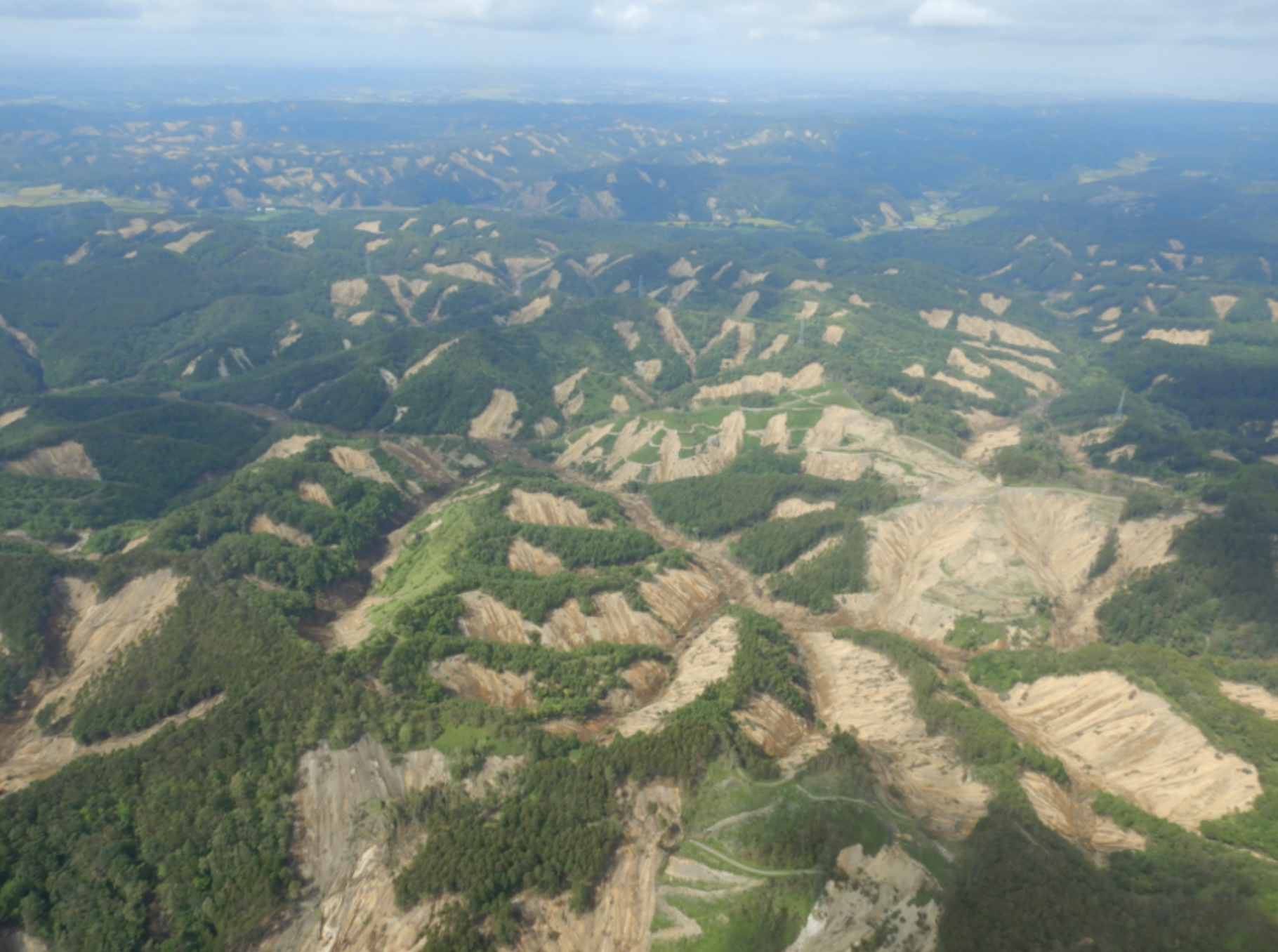
2018 Hokkaido Eastern Iburi earthquake

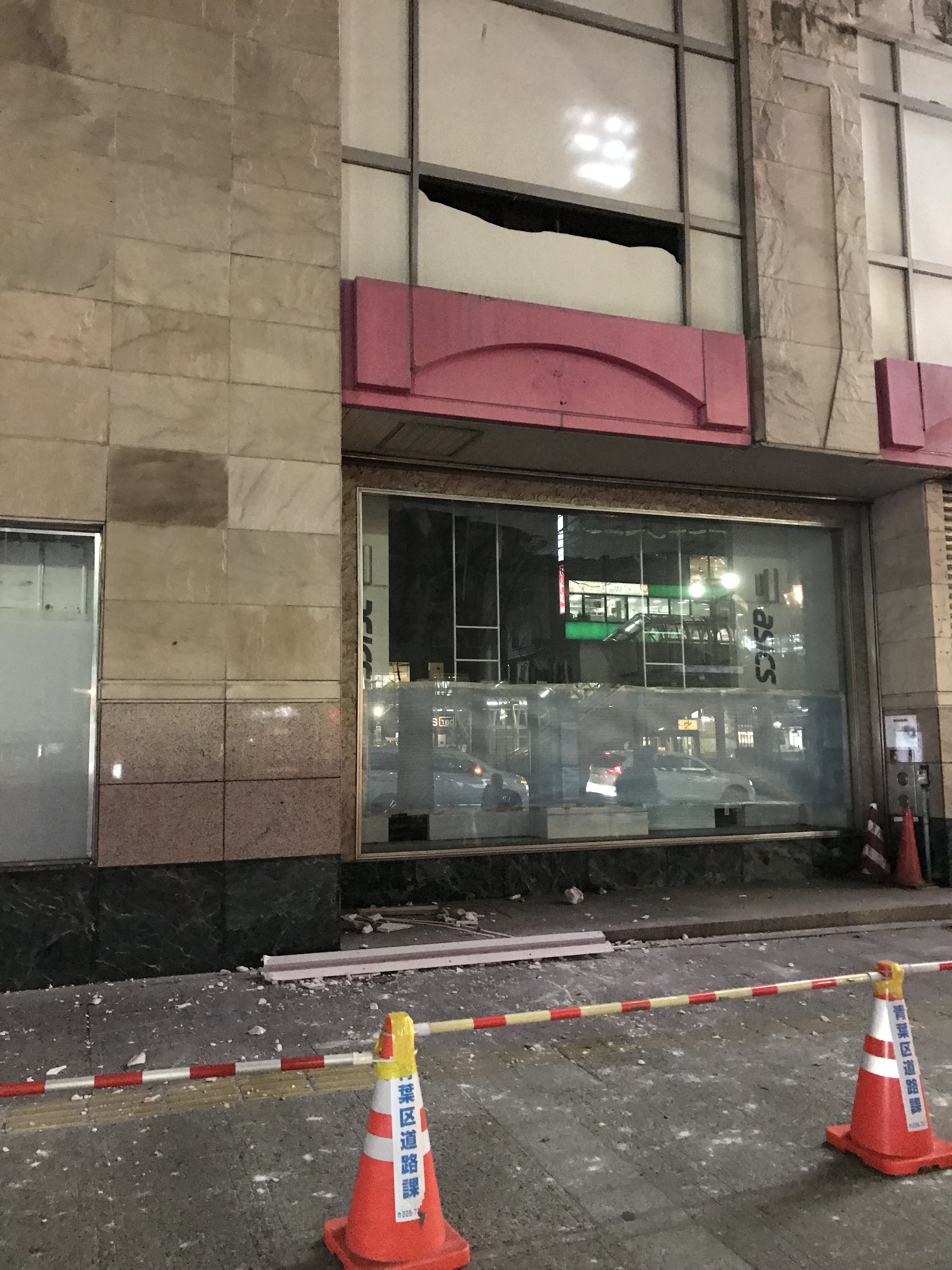
2022 Fukushima earthquake

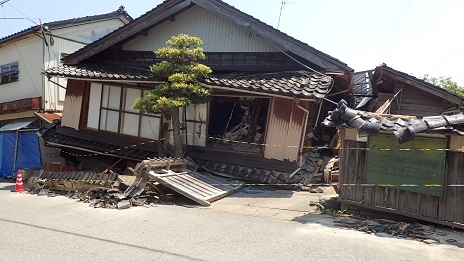
2023 Noto earthquake

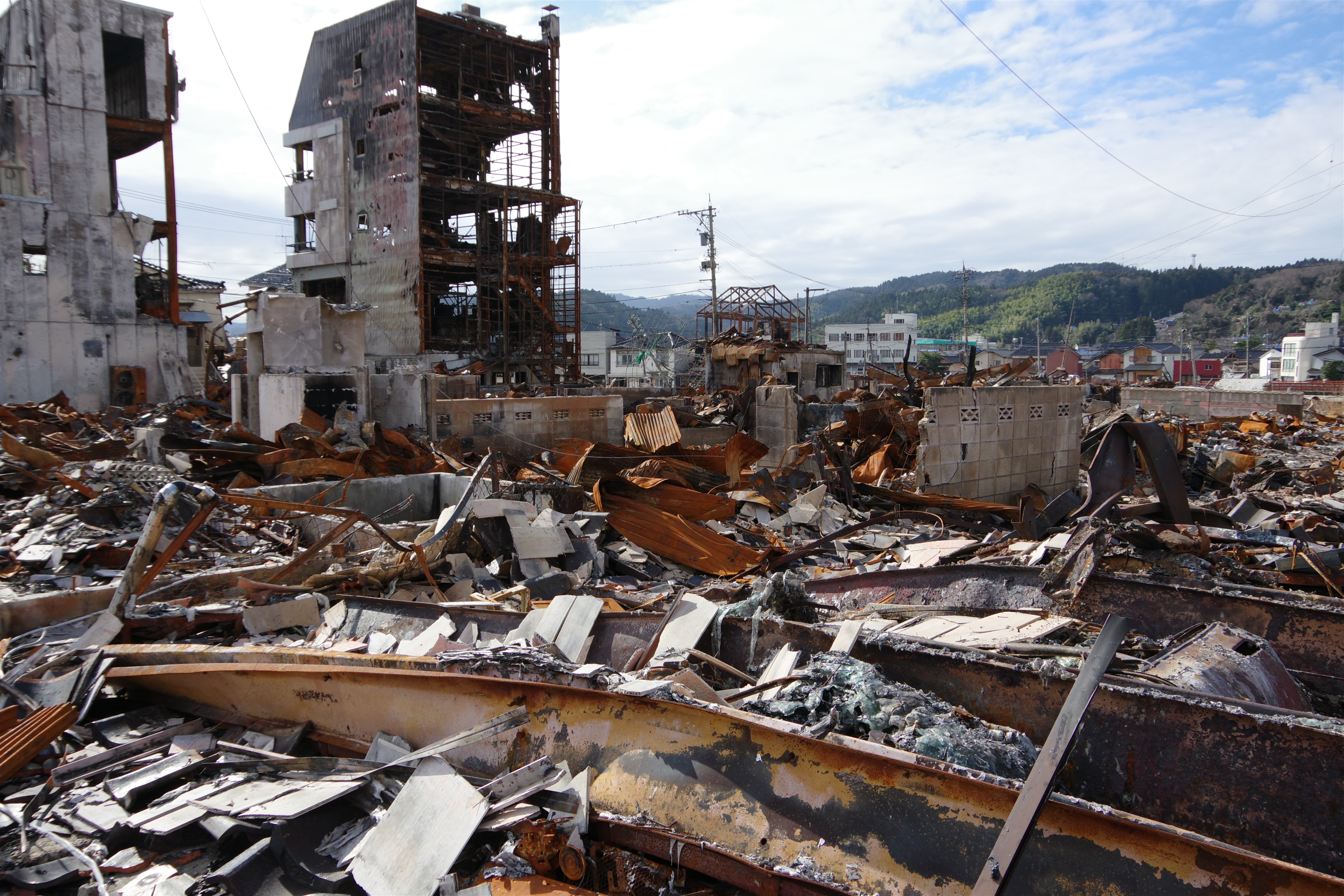
2024 Noto earthquake

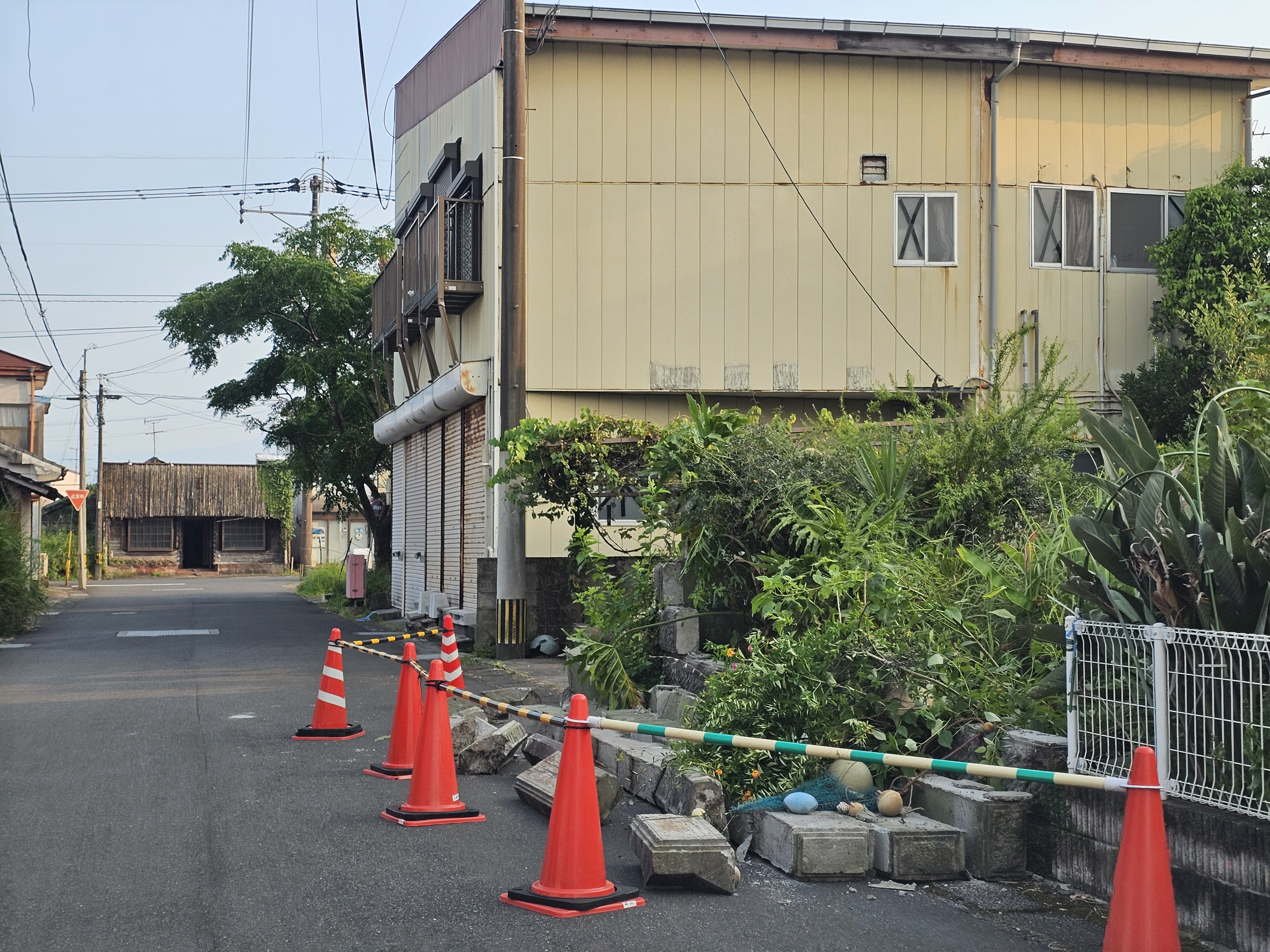
2024 Hyūga-nada earthquake

== See also ==
External images
- Statistical map of location, size and depth of earthquakes near Japan
- Zoomable map of recent earthquake activity

- Category: Japanese seismologists
- Coordinating Committee for Earthquake Prediction
- Geology of Japan
- Japan Meteorological Agency
- Japan Meteorological Agency seismic intensity scale
- List of disasters in Japan by death toll
- List of volcanoes in Japan
- Nuclear power in Japan § Seismicity
  - South Kantō earthquakes
  - Nankai megathrust earthquakes
  - Seismicity of the Sanriku coast
  - Tōkai earthquakes
  - Tōnankai earthquakes
