= Ansei great earthquakes =

Three major earthquakes in Japan

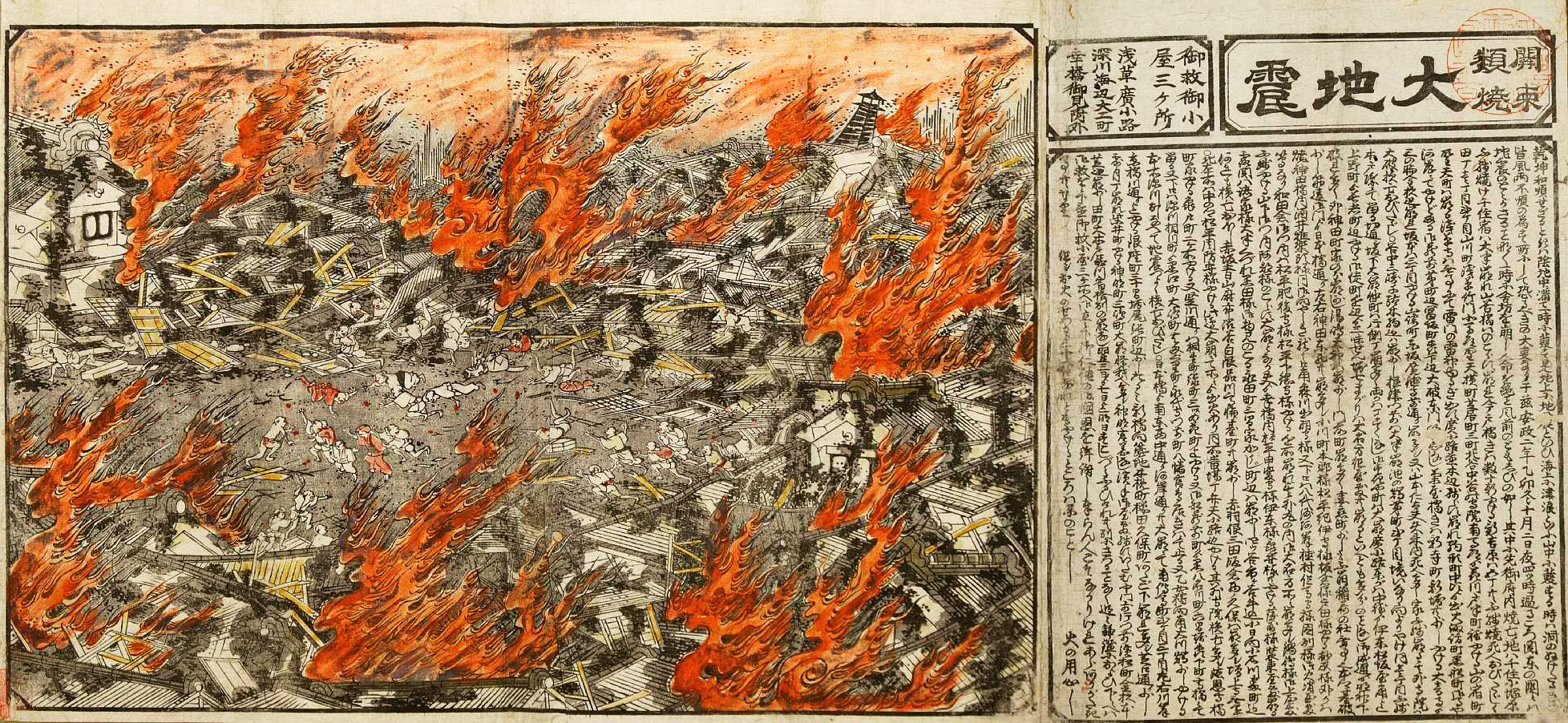
Ansei Great Earthquake, 1855.

The Ansei great earthquakes (安政の大地震, Ansei no Dai Jishin) were a series of major earthquakes that struck Japan during the Ansei era (1854–1860):

- The Ansei Tōkai quake (安政東海地震, Ansei Tōkai Jishin) was an 8.4 magnitude earthquake which struck on December 23, 1854. The epicenter ranged from Suruga Bay to the deep ocean, and struck primarily in the Tōkai region, but destroyed houses as far away as in Edo. The subsequent tsunami caused damage along the entire coast from the Bōsō Peninsula in modern-day Chiba prefecture to Tosa province (modern-day Kōchi Prefecture)
- The Ansei Nankai quake (安政南海地震, Ansei Nankai Jishin) was an 8.4 magnitude earthquake which struck on December 24, 1854. Over 10,000 people from the Tōkai region down to Kyushu were killed.
- The Hōyo Strait earthquake (豊予海峡地震, Hōyo Kaikyō Jishin) was an M7.4 intra-plate earthquake in Hōyo Strait affecting Kyushu and Shikoku on December 26, 1854. It affected nearby area more than the two megathrust earthquake that happened in the previous few days.
- The Ansei Edo quake (安政江戸地震, Ansei Edo Jishin) was a M_{s} 7.0 earthquake which struck Edo (modern-day Tokyo) on November 11, 1855. ~120 earthquakes and tremors in total were felt in Edo in 1854–55. The great earthquake struck after 10 p.m.; roughly 30 aftershocks continued until dawn. The epicenter was near the mouth of the Arakawa River. Records from the time indicate 6,641 deaths inside the city, and 2,759 injuries; much of the city was destroyed by fire, leading many people to stay in rural inns. Aftershocks continued for ~20. This quake was a particularly destructive deep thrust quake caused by a giant slab of rock stuck between the Philippine Sea plate and the Pacific plate.

The earthquakes were blamed on a giant catfish (Namazu) thrashing about. Ukiyo-e prints depicting namazu became very popular around this time.

== Aftermath ==
At that time, Yevfimiy Putyatin, who was in Japan, carried out rescue operations for the people of Shimoda. Until then, the Japanese had been wary of Russians, but after this incident, their perception of Russians began to change.

== Other notable quakes ==
1854 Iga-Ueno earthquake, one which registered 7.4 on the Richter scale and struck the Kansai region.

An 1856 earthquake off Hachinohe coast was estimated to be a megathrust earthquake with Magnitude 7–8, with tsunami recorded, however damage was relatively few.

The 1858 Hietsu earthquake struck Hida Province (modern-day Gifu Prefecture) on April 9, 1858.

== See also ==
- List of earthquakes in Japan
- List of tsunamis
