= Idosawa Fault =

Earthquake fault system in Fukushima Prefecture, Japan

Coordinates: 36.570°N 140.430°E

The Idosawa Fault (井戸沢断層, Idozawa Dansō), also referred to as the Shionihara Fault, is an active earthquake fault system located in Fukushima Prefecture of Japan, to the west of Iwaki city. It mainly consists of a trace of three separate striations.

== Structure ==
The fault was first mapped by the Active Fault Research Group in 1991 as a complex of north-northwest-striking inactive traces of fault in the Hamadōri region. It has since been compartmentalized into separate striations near Tabito-cho west of Iwaki city. The northernmost and largest of the faultlines, the North Fault, was identified in 2009 and extends roughly 24 km (15 mi) from the southeast to the northwest (N45˚W). To its southwest, two parallel faultlines, the East and Shionihara faults, extend from the south-southeast to the north-northwest (N10˚W). The faultlines are separated by 1 km (0.6 mi) and span roughly 23 km and 22 km (14 mi), respectively. The westernmost of the two, the Shionihara Fault lies near Tabito-cho and borders the small village of Shionohira, after which it was named.

The main structural trend is north-northwest–south-southeast, with sinking observed only to the south on the east side of the fault. Metamorphic rock and Cretaceous strata, as well as granite and epidiorite are distributed in the region; the fault is described as a limit to the distribution of tuff from the Neogene Period.

=== Yunodake Fault ===
To the northeast of the Idosawa Fault complex lies a separate normal fault trace, which was named the Yunodake Fault (also Yunotake) in 2011. Distanced approx. 50 km (30 mi) from the Fukushima Daiichi Nuclear Power Plant, the fault had been dormant for 120,000–130,000 before it ruptured during the magnitude 7.1 M_{w} Fukushima Hamadori earthquake on 11 April 2011. Several geological surveys have since been conducted in its vicinity. Evidence of sedimentary rock layers deposited after the Late Pleistocene beneath the fault suggests that the Yunotake Fault had been in the active in the past.

== Notable earthquakes ==
- March 19, 2011: A magnitude 6.1 earthquake struck near Ibaraki Prefecture, with its hypocenter located near the Idosawa Fault. The earthquake occurred as a result of normal-faulting.
- March 23, 2011: A magnitude 6.0 earthquake struck near northern Ibaraki. The quake occurred near the fault, with a focal mechanism of a normal-fault type.
- April 11, 2011: A magnitude 6.6 earthquake with a depth of 10 km (6 mi) struck near Ishikawa, Fukushima. The quake occurred along the Shionihira Fault and caused a surface rupture of approx. 7 km (4 mi). In addition, a vertical displacement of 0.8–1.8 m was observed.
- April 12, 2011: A magnitude 6.0 aftershock with a depth of 12 km (8 mi) struck near the same region along the Idosawa "North" Fault.

== See also ==
- Strike-slip tectonics
- Structural geology
