= April 2011 Fukushima earthquake =

Earthquake in Japan

Fukushima Hamadōri earthquake
- Location within Japan
- UTC time: 2011-04-11 08:16:12
- ISC event: 16416735
- USGS-ANSS: ComCat
- Local date: 11 April 2011
- Local time: 17:16 JST
- Magnitude: M_{w} 6.6
- Depth: 13 km (8 mi)
- Epicenter: 37.001°N 140.401°E
- Fault: Iodzawa fault, Yunodake fault
- Type: Normal
- Areas affected: Japan
- Max. intensity: MMI VIII (Severe) JMA 6−
- Peak acceleration: 2.11 g 2071.7 Gal
- Tsunami: No
- Landslides: Yes
- Casualties: 4 dead, 10 injured

A strong intraplate earthquake, with a magnitude of 6.6 on the moment magnitude scale (M_{w}), occurred at 17:16 JST (08:16 UTC) on 11 April, in the Hamadōri region of Fukushima, Japan. It had a shallow focus of 13 km (8.1 mi), with an inland epicentre, about 36 km (22 mi) west of Iwaki, causing widespread strong to locally severe shaking. It was triggered by the 2011 Tōhoku earthquake, and the strongest such event to have its epicentre located inland.

The earthquake occurred as a result of normal faulting to the west of Iwaki, and triggered numerous landslides across adjacent mountainous areas. A few fires broke out, and 220,000 households lost electricity. Officials issued localised tsunami alerts, though no significant waves were generated. The earthquake caused little structural damage, but killed four people and injured ten others. The strong ground movements caused by the reactivation of two geological faults in this area of low seismicity, prompted researchers to conduct extensive surveys in the region.

== Tectonic setting ==
Northern Honshu lies on the Okhotsk plate, beneath which the Pacific plate is subducting along the line of the Japan Trench, the surface expression of this convergent boundary. As a result of this convergence, much of the Okhotsk plate is in a state of west–east oriented compressive stress, leading potentially to a mix of strike-slip and reverse faulting. In coastal parts of southern Hamadōri and northern Ibaraki, however, the maximum horizontal stress is oriented approximately north–south, consistent with the presence of active normal faults in this area.

== Earthquake ==
The 6.6 M_{w} Fukushima Hamadōri earthquake occurred inland on 11 April 2011 at 08:16 UTC at a focal depth of 13 km (8.1 mi), about 36 km (22 mi) west of Iwaki, Fukushima, or 161 km (100 mi) north-northeast of Tokyo. This intraplate earthquake occurred in the vicinity of the Idosawa Fault – a shallow crustal fault in the Hamadōri region near Tabito town, Iwaki city, that had previously been inactive.

Surveys near the epicentre revealed two zones of surface rupture. Along the Izodawa fault, about 14 km (8.7 mi) of rupture were recorded and numerous fault scarps, with general vertical displacements of 0.8 to 1.5 m (2.6 to 4.9 ft); with maximum observed displacements in the range 1.99 m (6.5 ft) to 2.3 m (7.5 ft) the small village of Shionohira. Localised right-lateral slip of 30 cm (12 in) was observed at the subsiding west side of the rupture. The segments of the Idosawa Fault associated with this surface feature are sometimes referred to as the "Shionohira Fault". The nearby Yunodake Fault, a normal dip-slip fault northeast of the Idosawa Fault, that had been dormant for 120,000–130,000 years, also ruptured during the quake, with a maximum observed vertical offset of 0.87 m (2.9 ft). These observations indicated that the earthquake occurred as a result of normal dip-slip faulting with some strike-slip component.

Although it was associated with different fault zones away from the plate interface, the earthquake is related to the 11 March Tōhoku earthquake, which occurred offshore about 235 km (146 mi) to its northeast. It was initially described as an aftershock of the Tohoku earthquake, but is now generally interpreted to be a remotely triggered earthquake. The magnitude 9.0 M_{w} earthquake triggered widespread seismic activity, including over 67 earthquakes of magnitude 6.0 M_{w} or greater. Apart from the Fukushima Hamadōri earthquake, four of the related events measured magnitude 7.0 M_{w} or higher. The Fukushima Hamadōri earthquake, however, was the strongest such event to have its epicentre located inland. Early estimates placed the strength of the earthquake at a magnitude of 7.0–7.1, but the United States Geological Survey (USGS) lowered the magnitude to 6.6. The Japan Meteorological Agency (JMA) assessed a magnitude of 7.0 M_{j} and a depth of 6.4 km (4.0 mi).

From variations in observed displacement on the two surface ruptures and the geometry of fault branching, it has been inferred that rupture propagation began near the southern end of the Itozawa fault, close to the epicentre. The rupture then propagated to the north for 14 km until it approached the northwestern end of the Yunodake fault. The rupture then jumped the 2.5 km gap to that fault, before propagating southeastward for a further 16 km. The magnitude of the earthquake estimated from geological parameters taken from these two surface ruptures is in the range 6.5–6.8 M_{w}.

The occurrence of active normal faulting on the Pacific coastal area of Honshu, within a zone presumed to be under west-east compression, led to the suggestion that the Tohoku earthquake temporarily altered stress state around the epicentral area. However, a study of microearthquakes over the preceding several years demonstrate that the area has been subjected to long-term extension.

The Fukushima Hamadōri earthquake was followed by a number of aftershocks; that same day, at least 11 earthquakes of magnitude 3.5 M_{j} or higher were recorded near its epicentre. Of the series, the strongest registered at a magnitude of 5.5 M_{j} and occurred within 3.5 hours after the initial quake. A shallow magnitude 6.0 M_{w} (6.4 M_{j}) earthquake and several smaller tremors struck the region on 12 April.

== Effects ==
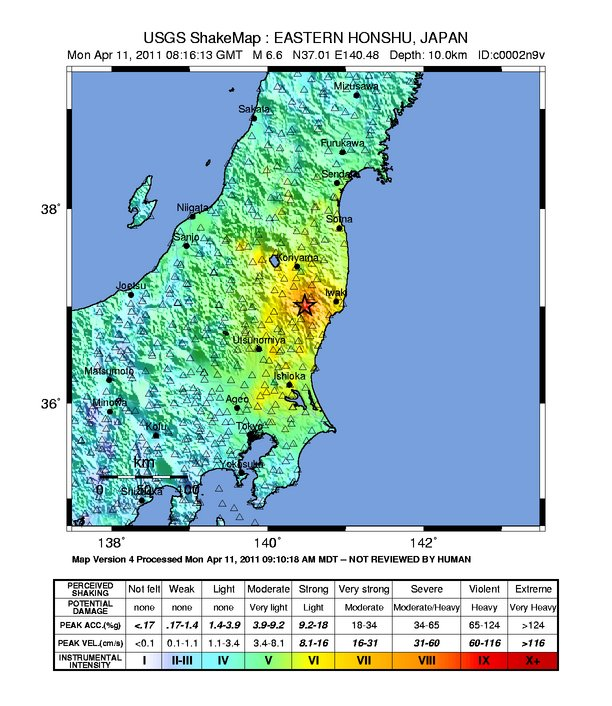
USGS shake map

The earthquake struck in the late afternoon near a moderately populated region of the Fukushima Prefecture, although most structures around the epicentre were resistant to earthquake shaking. Focussed at an unusually shallow depth, the earthquake generated significant shaking throughout many adjacent prefectures. The strongest ground motion registered at severe (MM VIII) in Ishikawa town on the Mercalli intensity scale. Strong shaking (MM VI) spread through Iwaki, Sukawaga, Kuroiso, Ōtawara and Kitaibaraki, with light tremors (MM IV) felt in areas up to several hundred kilometres from the epicentre, including Tokyo and Yokohama. The earthquake cut electricity to about 220,000 households, with most of the cuts reported in Iwaki city. Workers at the Fukushima Daiichi power plant – distanced 70 km (43 mi) from the epicentre – evacuated to safety, and external power to the plant was cut. The outage briefly disrupted cooling water injections into three of the reactors, but services to the plant were restored by 18:05 JST. Authorities at Tokyo International Airport closed all runways momentarily, while NTT DoCoMo restricted voice calls in 14 prefectures following the quake. East Japan Railway Company temporarily suspended its services to restart four of five bullet-train lines; other Shinkansen bullet trains in the region were also halted.

The earthquake sparked several fires in Iwaki, with one fire breaking out in Asakawa town. Fire engines extinguished a blaze in a liquefied natural gas tank at Daiichi Sankyo's Onahama Plant. Most of the structural damage was due to scattered rock- and landslides along hillsides in the vicinity of Iwaki. A landslide crushed two vehicles and buried three homes in the city, trapping a number of the inhabitants. The incident resulted in two immediate deaths. Four people were critically injured and taken to hospital; one of them was later pronounced dead. The Iwaki Ibaraki Route 14 interchange of the Jōban Expressway, which runs from Misato, Saitama, to Tomiya, Miyagi, was cut off to traffic by a large landslide of 120 m × 100 m (390 ft × 330 ft). In Tabito town, very close to the epicentre, a 170 m × 50 m (560 ft × 160 ft) landslide resulted in the formation of a quake lake – a natural damming of a river by mass wasting – with a water level of 15 m (49 ft) and a storage volume of 1,000–2,500 m^{3} (35,000–90,000 cu ft). Significant land deformation with traces of uplift was observed in and around town, affecting local roads but largely sparing its structures.

A total of seven people from other regions near the epicentre, including southern Ibaraki, Tochigi and Kanagawa prefectures, suffered minor injuries. Another person was injured during the magnitude 6.0 (M_{w}) aftershock of 12 April. In a report from July 2011, the Fire and Disaster Management Agency confirmed a death toll of four from the earthquake.

== Response ==
Japan's Earthquake Early Warning system was activated upon the detection of primary waves – seismic waves that forego an earthquake's perceivable ground motions – giving residents 6.8 seconds to seek cover before the main shock. At the risk of a tsunami – which reach their destructive wave heights near shallow coastal waters – local fishing boats along coastlines were shown heading out to sea on national news broadcasts. A warning for a localised tsunami of up to 2.0 m (6.6 ft) was issued by the Japan Meteorological Agency; however, no significant waves were recorded, and the warning was cancelled soon thereafter. In response to the earthquake, the fire department dispatched search and rescue teams and emergency crews for relief efforts and damage assessments throughout the affected area. Six medical crews in pairs of two were also sent to Kanagawa, Chiba and Gunma prefectures. Former Prime Minister Naoto Kan postponed a press conference scheduled for 17:50 JST marking the one-month anniversary of the catastrophic Tōhoku earthquake and tsunami.

The Fukushima Hamadōri earthquake occurred in a region with historically low levels of seismicity; studies showed that the recent activity near the fault zone had been triggered by the Tōhoku earthquake. Ever since the earthquake triggered their reactivation, the Shionohira and Yunodake faults have provided essential data for local geological surveys on regional land deformation, sedimentary rock distribution and landslide vulnerability. In the earthquake's aftermath, Professor Yagi Hiroshi from the Faculty of Education, Art and Science noted that "a possibility exists for widespread aftershocks of the same size to occur in the near future."

== See also ==
- List of earthquakes in 2011
- List of earthquakes in Japan
- 2016 Fukushima earthquake
- 2021 Fukushima earthquake
