= 1858 Hietsu earthquake =

Earthquakes in Japan

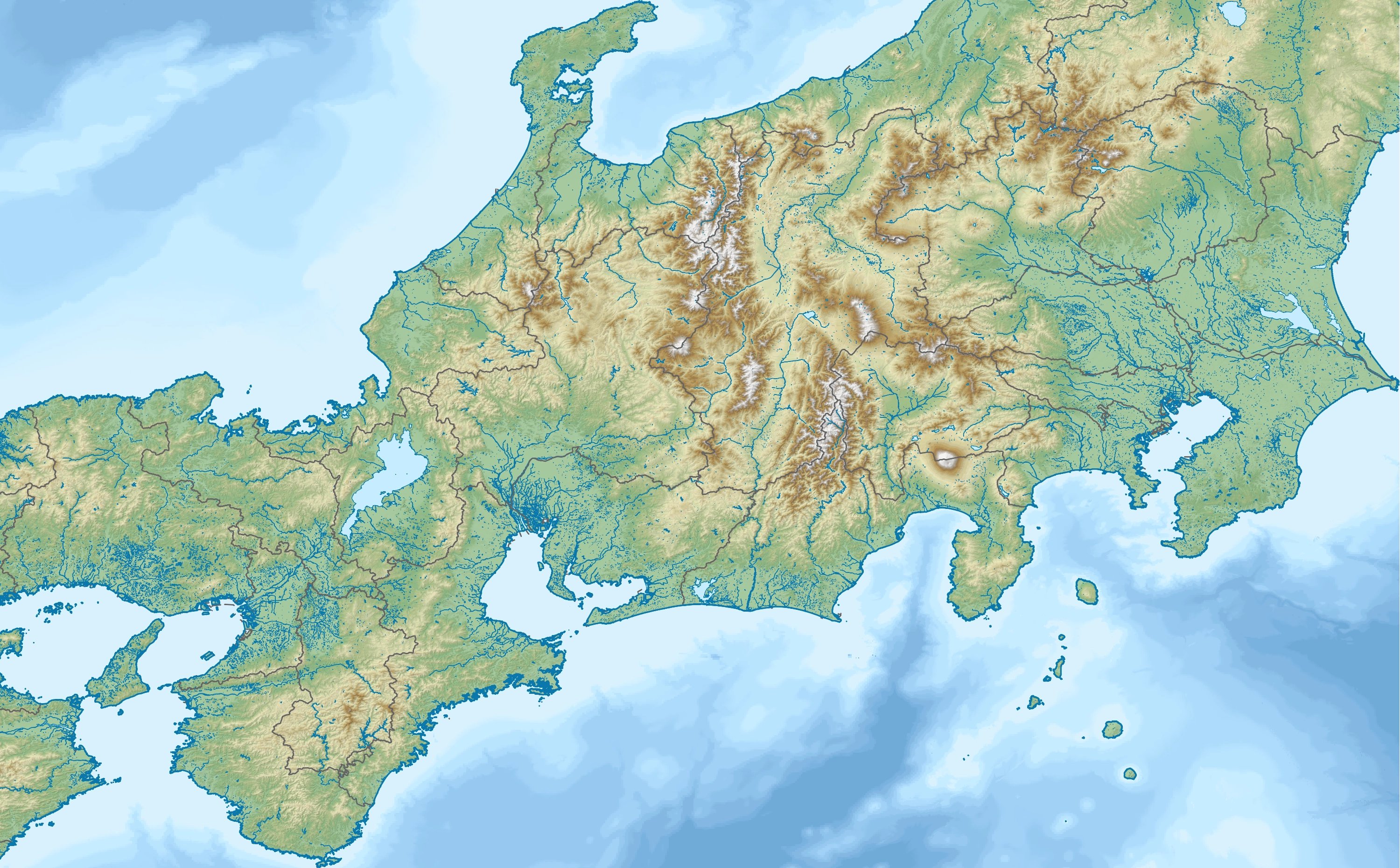
- Location within Central Japan
- Local date: April 9, 1858
- Magnitude: 7.1 M
- Epicenter: 36.4°N 137.2°E
- Areas affected: Japan
- Casualties: 426

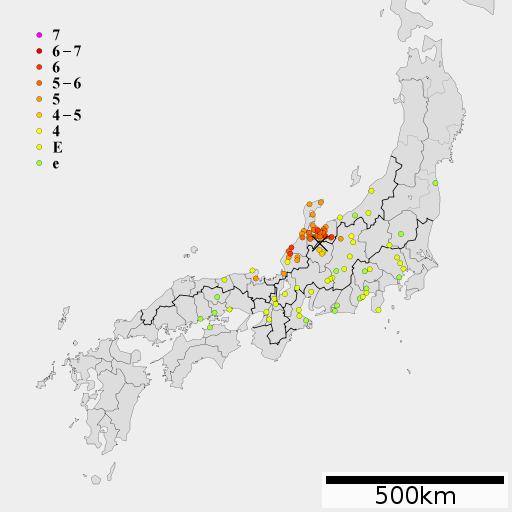
Intensity of the 1858 Hietsu earthquake

The Hietsu earthquake (飛越地震, Hietsu jishin) was a doublet earthquake that took place on April 9, 1858 (according to the old Japanese calendar, the 26th day of the second month of Ansei 5). It most likely occurred on the Atotsugawa and Miboro faults, which connect the Amō Pass in Gifu Prefecture (in the part that was called Hida Province) and Mount Tate in Toyama Prefecture (then known as Etchū Province) on the island of Honshū in Japan. Its name includes one kanji from Hida (飛騨国) and one from Etchū (越中国). The earthquakes are estimated to have killed 200–300 people. It also caused the Mount Tonbiyama landslide and blocked the upper reaches of the Jōganji River.

== See also ==
- Ansei great earthquakes
- List of earthquakes in Japan
- List of historical earthquakes
