= 1961 North Mino earthquake =

Earthquake in Japan

- 北美濃地震
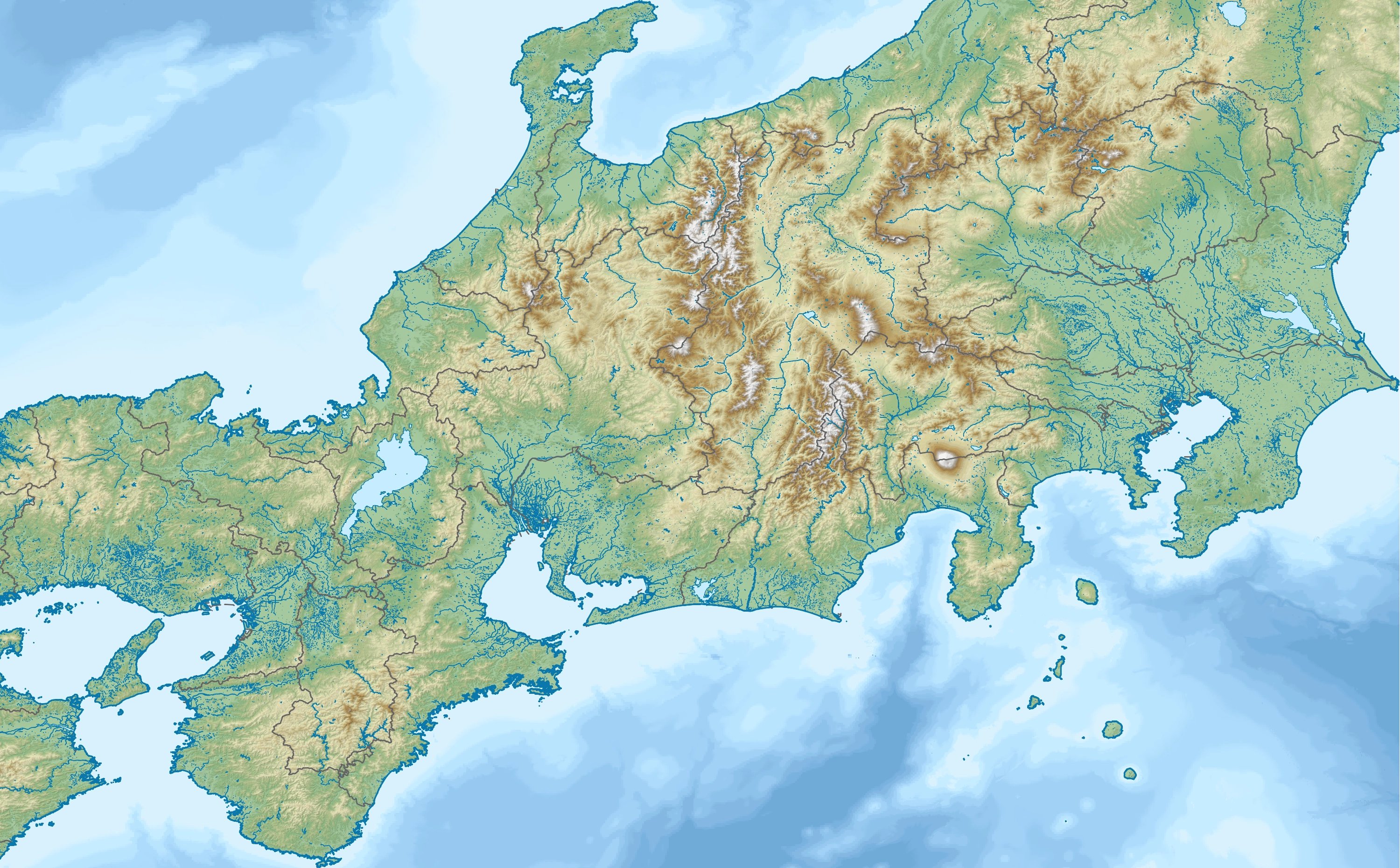
- Location within Central Japan
- UTC time: 1961-08-19 05:33
- ISC event: 877216
- USGS-ANSS: ComCat
- Local date: August 19, 1961
- Local time: 14:33 (Japan Standard Time)
- Magnitude: M_{s} 7.0; M_{w} 6.8
- Epicenter: 36°06.7′N 136°42.0′E
- Casualties: 8 dead, 43 injured

The 1961 Kita Mino earthquake (Japanese: 北美濃地震) is an earthquake that occurred on August 19, 1961, near the border between Ishikawa, Fukui and Gifu Prefectures in Japan. The magnitude was 7.0. The earthquake left 8 people dead and 43 people injured.
