= 1611 Aizu earthquake =

Historical earthquake in Japan

- 会津地震
- Location within Japan
- Local date: September 27, 1611
- Local time: around 09:00 JST (UTC+9)
- Magnitude: 6.9 M_{(K)}
- Epicenter: 37.6°N 139.8°E
- Areas affected: Fukushima Prefecture, Japan
- Total damage: Extensive destruction
- Casualties: ~3,700 deaths (official estimate)

The 1611 Aizu earthquake (Japanese: 会津地震) occurred on September 27, 1611, in the Aizu Basin in present-day Fukushima Prefecture, Japan. According to the official report, it was estimated that there were more than 3,700 fatalities. Aizuwakamatsu Castle, many temples, and about 20,000 houses collapsed in the stricken areas.

== Overview ==
- Date: September 27, 1611
- Magnitude: 6.9 M_{K}
- Epicenter: Aizu Basin (present day Fukushima Prefecture)
- Death toll: 3,700+ (official estimate)
