= 1843 Tokachi earthquake =

Earthquake in southeast Hokkaido, Japan

- Location within Hokkaido
- Local date: April 25, 1843
- Local time: 06:00
- Magnitude: 8.0 M_{JMA}
- Epicenter: 42.0°N 146.0°E
- Areas affected: Japan
- Tsunami: Yes
- Casualties: 91 drowned

The southeastern part of Hokkaido and the northern Sanriku coast in Japan were struck by a major earthquake and tsunami on 25 April 1843 at 06:00 local time. It had an estimated magnitude of about 8.0 M_{w}. The tsunami resulted in more than 90 deaths.

== Tectonic setting ==
The island of Hokkaido lies at the southern end of the Kuril–Kamchatka Trench, near its junction with the Japan Trench. At this destructive plate boundary, oceanic crust of the Pacific plate is subducting beneath the Okhotsk plate. The section of the megathrust along this plate boundary has been subdivided into three main segments, in terms of its rupture behaviour in historical earthquakes, named from southwest to northeast: Tokachi, Akkeshi and Nemuro. The last two large interplate earthquakes to affect this area were in 1952 and 2003, rupturing the Tokachi and Akkeshi and just the Tokachi segments respectively.

== Earthquake ==
Along the Pacific coast of Hokkaido the earthquake was felt with an intensity of 5 on the Japan Meteorological Agency seismic intensity scale (Shindo). Elsewhere, the earthquake was felt in Tsugaru, Aomori, near Hirosaki, and at Hachinohe in northern Honshu with an intensity of Shindo 4, and as far away as Tokyo (then Edo).

The estimated magnitude for this event varies between M_{JMA} 8.0 and M_{s} 8.4. The size of the tsunami has also been used to estimated a tsunami magnitude M_{t} of 8.0.

The earthquake is thought to have ruptured the Akkeshi segment of the plate boundary and possibly the Tokachi segment. Evidence of higher run ups in the Nemuro area than observed in the 1952 event has been used to propose that the Nemuro segment was also ruptured in the 1843 event.

== Tsunami ==
The tsunami affected the southeastern coast of Hokkaido and the northern part of the Sanriku coast in northern Honshu. Run ups for the tsunami have been estimated from contemporary reports. On Hokkaido, the maximum estimated run up was 5–6 m at Senpoushi Monshizu, or 7.1 m at Hanasaki. On the Sanriku coast the maximum estimated run up was 3.1 m at Akamae, near Miyako.

Tsunami deposits have been identified at the Kiritappu lagoon and the Mochurippu-toh estuary, both near Akkeshi, that have been linked to the 1843 earthquake.

== Impact ==
Most of the impact from this earthquake was a result of the associated tsunami, although reports from a temple at Akkeshi describe stone lanterns and statues being toppled. Many buildings along the coast were swept away by the tsunami including 75 houses at Akkeshi and a village of 50 houses at Hanasaki. Houses were also damaged at Hachinohe.

All of the reported casualties were a result of the tsunami. 45 people were drowned at Akkeshi, while a further 46 people were drowned at Tarō, Iwate on the Sanriku coast.
