= 1854 Iga–Ueno earthquake =

Coordinates: 34.559°N 135.875°E

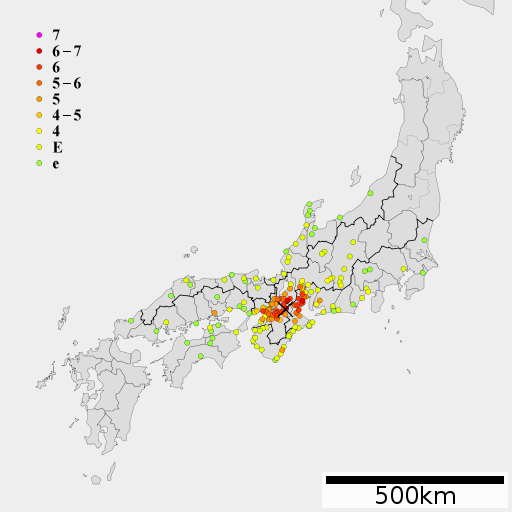
1854 Iga–Ueno earthquake intensity

The 1854 Iga–Ueno earthquake (Japanese: 伊賀上野地震) occurred on July 9, 1854, and struck the Kansai region of central Japan. According to the official confirmed report, 2,576 houses and buildings were damaged, with 995 human fatalities and 994 injures in the affected area. It occurred on the Kizugawa Fault.

== Overview ==
- Date : July 9, 1854
- Magnitude : 7.25 M_{K}
- Richter scale : 7.4
- Epicenter : Iga, Mie Prefecture (then Iga Province)
- Death toll : 995 (official confirmed)
