= Vertical displacement =

Vertical shift of land in plate tectonics

In tectonics, vertical displacement refers to the shifting of land in a vertical direction, resulting in uplift and subsidence. The displacement of rock layers can provide information on how and why Earth's lithosphere changes throughout geologic time. There are different mechanisms which lead to vertical displacement such as tectonic activity, and isostatic adjustments. Tectonic activity leads to vertical displacement when crust is rearranged during a seismic event. Isostatic adjustments result in vertical displacement through sinking due to an increased load or isostatic rebound due to load removal.

== Tectonic causes of vertical displacement ==
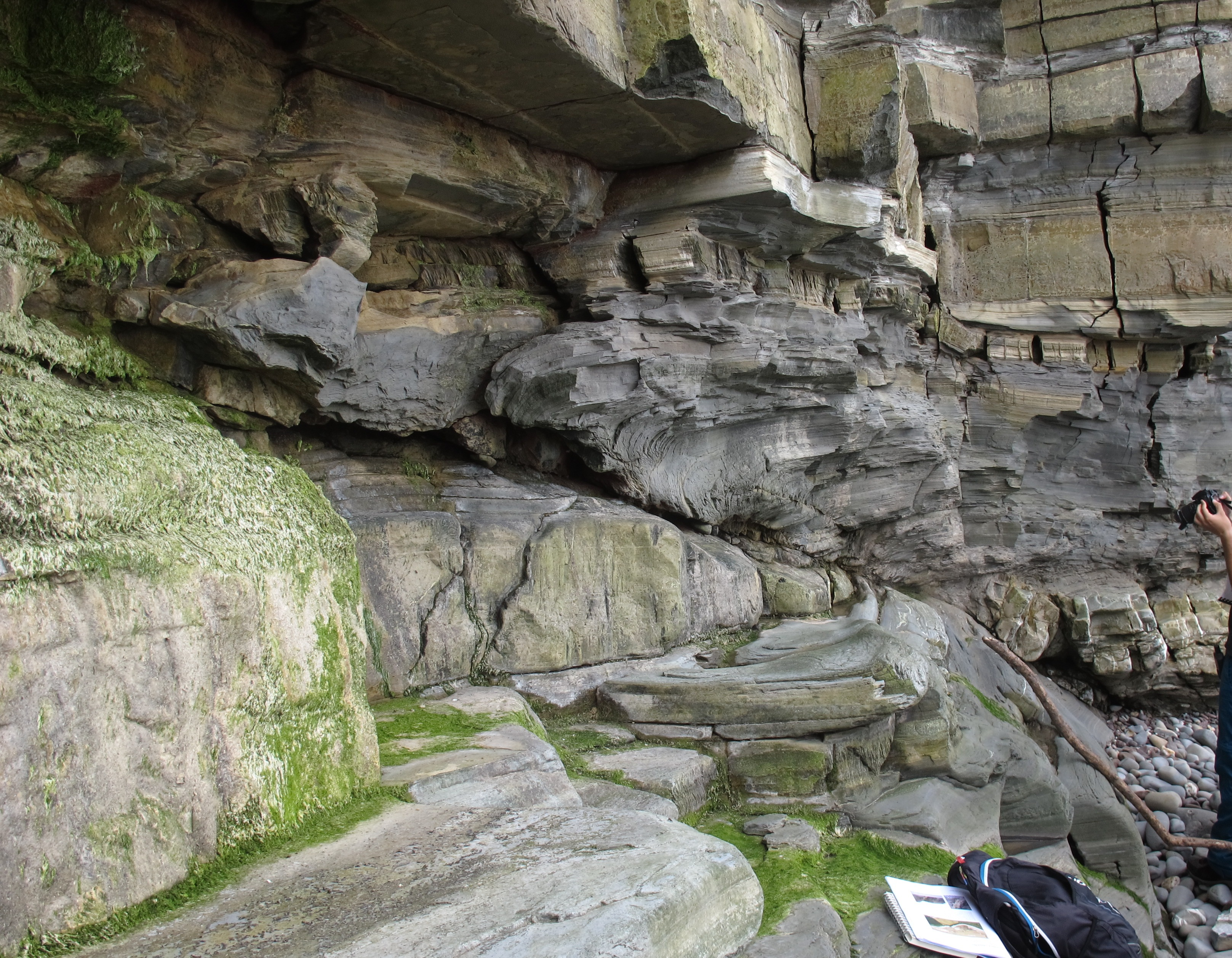
Displacement of the dark mudstone layer pictured is a part of the surface layer above (not pictured), indicating a vertical displacement of this layer of rock.

Vertical displacement resulting from tectonic activity occurs at divergent and convergent plate boundaries. The movement of magma in the asthenosphere can create divergent plate boundaries as the magma begins to rise and protrude weaker lithospheric crust. Subsidence at a divergent plate boundary is a form of vertical displacement which occurs when a plate begins to split apart. As intrusive magma widens the rift zone of a divergent plate boundary the layers of crust on the surface above the rift will subside into the rift, creating a vertical displacement of those layers of surface crust.

Convergent plate boundaries create orogenies such as the Laramide orogeny that raised the Rocky Mountains. For this orogen event dense oceanic crust from the Pacific plate subducts beneath the less dense continental crust of the North American plate as they converge. This subduction induced the compression of the bounded western region of the North American plate which created the uplift of different layers of rock. This vertical displacement created the various mountain formations which are cumulatively known as the Rocky Mountain range.

Earthquakes are one mechanism that leads to vertical displacement of crust. The fracturing of land during an earthquake creates a fault when land is displaced during the event. The throw of the fault is a term used to describe and quantify the magnitude of this displacement.

== Glacial isostatic adjustment ==
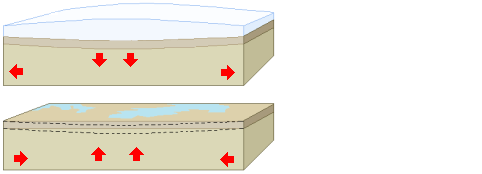
top: Image shows isostatic depression due to the weight of ice on top of it. bottom: Image shows isostatic rebound due to load removal.

Changes in glaciation can lead to the vertical displacement of crust. Glaciers and ice sheets residing on top of landmass result in an isostatic depression, or sinking, in a section of lithospheric crust due to the weight of the ice. Likewise, isostatic rebound, or uplift, occurs when glaciers and ice sheets recede.

Using asthenosphere viscosity data researchers are able to determine the rate by which isostatic rebound occurs. Isostatic rebound occurrence rate can be determined by comparing local viscosities to the maximum viscosity of the asthenosphere. Areas with higher viscosity are subject to quick isostatic rebound while in regions of low viscosity crustal uplift occurs at a slower rate. Uplift is still occurring through isostatic rebound from the Last Glacial Maximum.

Glacial isostatic rebound leads to sea level regression which can be measured using ^{14}C dating to determine the age of sublittoral sediment in different regions along the seafloor.

== See also ==
- Ground displacement
