= Megathrust earthquakes along the Sagami Trough =

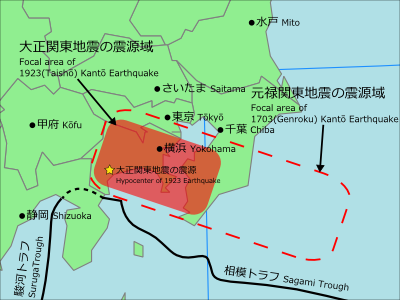
Estimated rupture areas of the 1923 Great Kantō earthquake (red solid line) and the 1703 Genroku earthquake (red dashed line), as assumed by the Earthquake Research Committee in 2004.

The Sagami Trough megathrust earthquake is a large earthquake that is considered to occur at roughly 200-year intervals in the Kantō region of Japan, caused by slip along the Sagami Trough. Known earthquakes that are definitively associated with the Sagami Trough include the 1703 Genroku earthquake and the 1923 Great Kantō earthquake. However, the recurrence interval of such earthquakes, as well as the relationship between earlier events and the Kantō earthquake, has not yet been fully clarified.

Sagami Bay in Minami Kantō lies in a region where the Philippine Sea Plate and the North American Plate meet along the Sagami Trough. It is estimated that megathrust earthquakes occur repeatedly in this region at intervals of several hundred years. While it remains unclear which earthquakes occurred in prehistoric times, historical records document the 1703 Genroku earthquake, with an estimated magnitude of M8.1–8.5, and the 1923 Great Kantō earthquake, with an estimated magnitude of M7.9–8.3. In addition, the 1855 Ansei Edo earthquake occurred between the Genroku earthquake and the Great Kantō earthquake. However, the exact source fault of this earthquake has not been clearly identified, and it is not regarded as a Sagami Trough earthquake. In 1980, Professor Otake proposed that the source region of the Ansei-era earthquakes was located on the inland side north of the Sagami Trough rupture area of the 1923 Great Kantō earthquake, and suggested that the 1894 Meiji Tokyo earthquake was a deep-focus earthquake.

Based on the recurrence interval between the 1703 Genroku earthquake and the 1923 Great Kantō earthquake, as well as analyses of the estimated fault slip during the Great Kantō earthquake, it has been inferred that the degree of interplate coupling in the western half of the Sagami Trough is close to 100%. It is therefore considered that most of the strain accumulated between the plates is released through seismic events.

Meanwhile, the plate boundary between the Philippine Sea Plate and Honshu is considered to be located in the vicinity of Zenisu Ridge. From a geological timescale perspective, and considering the Tokai earthquake expected to occur along the Suruga Trough, some researchers have argued that the 1923 Great Kantō earthquake may also have been an intraplate earthquake.

== Probability of occurrence ==
The Earthquake Research Committee of Japan estimated in its 2004 assessment that an "M8-class earthquake along the Sagami Trough" would be represented by two events, the 1703 and 1923 earthquakes, when calculating recurrence probabilities. However, in its 2014 publication, *Long-term Evaluation of Seismic Activity along the Sagami Trough (Second Edition)* (相模トラフ沿いの地震活動の長期評価（第二版）), the committee expanded the dataset to include three earthquakes—1293, 1703, and 1923—as well as a fourth event in 1495, which remains debated as either a Kantō earthquake or otherwise, when estimating probabilities of M8-class earthquakes along the Sagami Trough. Assuming a Brownian Passage Time (BPT) model, the probability of an earthquake occurring within 30 years was calculated based on these datasets. In addition, studies by Fujiwara et al. (1997, 1999) suggest that the recurrence interval of Genroku-type Kantō earthquakes inferred from tsunami deposits and Holocene uplift records on marine terraces along the southern Bōsō Peninsula is approximately 2,300 years, based on inferred events around 5200 BCE, 3000 BCE, 1000 BCE, and 1703 CE. Furthermore, the maximum scenario earthquake assumed for complete rupture of the Sagami Trough megathrust has been modeled as Mw 8.6 (or Mw 8.7 for tsunami fault models).

Earthquake probability assessment (cited from the Earthquake Research Committee of Japan)
Type	Category	Probability of occurrence within 30 years (at time of evaluation)			
Type	Category	1 January 2004		1 January 2014	
Taishō-type Kantō earthquake	Interplate earthquake	~M7.9	0–0.8%	M7.9–8.6	0–5%
Genroku-type Kantō earthquake	Interplate earthquake	~M8.1	~0%	M7.9–8.6	~0%

Since 2015, the Earthquake Research Committee of Japan has stated that distinguishing between Genroku-type and Taishō-type Kantō earthquakes has limited practical significance. Because the rupture behavior varies, these events are now collectively evaluated as "M8-class earthquakes along the Sagami Trough". Under this unified model, the estimated probabilities of occurrence are approximately 0–2% within 10 years, 0–6% within 30 years, and 0–10% within 50 years. For Genroku-type Kantō earthquakes occurring offshore south of the Bōsō Peninsula—associated with the formation of Holocene marine terraces—the average recurrence interval is estimated at about 2,300 years, resulting in a near-0% probability of occurrence.

Earthquake occurrence probability (cited from the Earthquake Research Committee of Japan)
Region	Earthquake type	As of 1 January 2024	
Region	Earthquake type	Magnitude (M)	30-year probability of occurrence
Sagami Trough	Interplate earthquake	~M7.9 (M7.9–8.6)	0–6%

== Earthquakes considered to be Sagami Trough megathrust earthquakes ==
Historical records in the Minami Kantō region are extremely limited prior to 1590 (Tenshō 18), marked by the fall of the Later Hōjō clan and the entry of Tokugawa Ieyasu into Edo. Except for the Kamakura period, almost no continuous historical documentation survives, making it difficult to confirm the occurrence of past Kantō earthquakes through historical records alone. However, major earthquakes recorded in 878 (the Sagami–Musashi earthquake), 1293 (the Kamakura earthquake), and 1433 (Eishō Sagami earthquake) are considered to have likely originated from the Sagami Trough. It is also suggested that additional unidentified megathrust earthquakes may have occurred. The 1257 Shōka Kamakura earthquake is also hypothesized to have occurred along the Sagami Trough. The following list of earthquakes is presented in the Julian calendar and refers to events interpreted as Sagami Trough earthquakes.

1. The 818 Konin earthquake (Konin 7 September 818) is recorded in the Nihon Kōki as a seismic event in the Kantō region, and some researchers argue that it may be comparable to the 1923 Great Kantō earthquake. Earthquake records exist in Sagami, Musashi, Shimōsa, Hitachi, Kōzuke, and Shimotsuke provinces, while no records exist in Kazusa and Awa provinces, and there are no descriptions of tsunami impact. Based on this evidence, Hagiwara (1982) proposed that the earthquake was an inland crustal event.
2. 878 (Gangyō 2, 9th month, 29th day) – The Sagami–Musashi earthquake is recorded in the Nihon Sandai Jitsuroku as having caused seismic activity in the Kantō region. One hypothesis links it to activity on the Isehara Fault, while tsunami deposits dated to around 900 CE found in Tateyama, Chiba support the interpretation of a plate-boundary earthquake along the Sagami Trough.
3. 20 May 1293 (Shōō 6, 4th month, 13th day) – The 1293 Kamakura earthquake is interpreted by Ishibashi (1991) as a great plate-boundary megathrust earthquake along the Sagami Trough. Tsunami deposits believed to date from this period have been found at Koajiro Bay on the Miura Peninsula. In addition, the Iwai Lowland shows evidence of a lagoon formed by coseismic uplift and coastal isolation during the same period.
4. 3 September 1495 (Meiō 4, 8th month, 15th day) – The 1495 Meiō earthquake is recorded in the Kamakura Ōkagami as having caused the loss of the Great Buddha Hall at Kōtoku-in. However, this record has often been considered a misdating of the 1498 Meiō Tōkai earthquake. The Meiboku Mujinzo record indicates that by 1486 (Bunmei 18), the Great Buddha had already been displaced, contradicting the Kamakura Ōkagami account. However, there are also records of an earthquake in Kyoto on the same day. Ishibashi (1998) suggested that this event may correspond to a great earthquake along the Sagami Trough. Kaneko (2012) proposed that tsunami deposits found at the Usami site in Itō, Shizuoka correspond to this earthquake, and suggested that Hōjō Sōun took advantage of the chaos caused by the tsunami to capture Odawara Castle.

== Earthquakes regarded as Sagami Trough megathrust earthquakes ==
=== Genroku earthquake ===
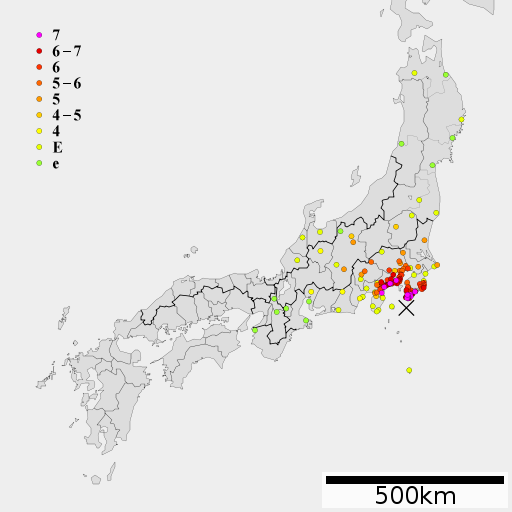
Estimated seismic intensity distribution of the 1703 Genroku earthquake across Japan.

The 1703 Genroku earthquake occurred on 31 December 1703 (Genroku 16, 23rd day of the 11th month) at around 2 p.m. Hiroshi Kawasumi (1951) estimated the magnitude of the Genroku earthquake to be M8.2. The fault model of the 1703 Genroku earthquake proposed by the Headquarters for Earthquake Research Promotion (HERP), Central Disaster Management Council of Japan, estimates a magnitude of approximately Mw 8.5.

This type of earthquake is assumed to originate offshore south of the Bōsō Peninsula. According to a model proposed by Kasahara (1973), it is a reverse fault earthquake parallel to the Sagami Trough, extending further toward the Pacific Ocean and including the rupture area of the 1923 Great Kantō earthquake. In 2005, Shishikura proposed that Genroku-type earthquakes may occur as a linked or cascading sequence of events of the Taishō-type Kantō earthquake.

The distribution of seismic intensity in the Genroku earthquake is almost identical to that of the 1923 Great Kantō earthquake, and the patterns of uplift and subsidence north of Sagami Bay are also similar. In 1931, Imamura pointed out that the amount of uplift in southern Bōsō Peninsula during the Genroku earthquake was greater than in other regions. In addition, tsunami records from distant regions such as Owase in Kii Province and Tosa Province exist, while the largest tsunami height is recorded in the Bōsō area, suggesting that the source region was located offshore of the Bōsō Peninsula. The tsunami that struck the Kujukuri coast is estimated to have reached a maximum height of about 3 m (Hatori estimated 5–6 m), and it is believed to have penetrated 3–4 km inland, causing approximately 3,000 casualties.

=== Great Kantō earthquake ===
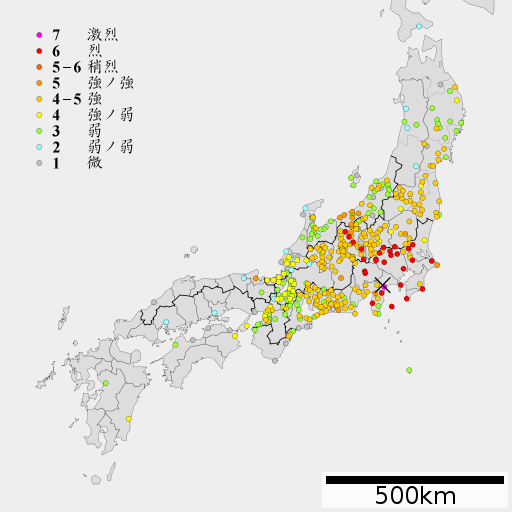
Map showing the intensity of shaking recorded across Japan during the 1923 Great Kantō earthquake.

The Great Kantō earthquake, also known as the Kantō earthquake, occurred at 11:58 JST on September 1, 1923 (Taishō 12). The epicenter has been variously located east of Lake Kawaguchi, in western Kanagawa Prefecture, or in Sagami Bay, among other proposed locations. Its magnitude has been estimated between M7.9 and M8.3, depending on the model. The Central Disaster Management Council of Japan's fault model estimates a moment magnitude of Mw 8.2.

Professor Hiroo Kanamori proposed that the Great Kantō earthquake was a low-angle reverse-fault earthquake occurring along a zone parallel to the axis of the Sagami Trough. Several fault models have been proposed for the Great Kantō earthquake, but in most cases the northwestern edge of the source region is placed in eastern Yamanashi Prefecture or western Kanagawa Prefecture, while the southeastern edge is located near Cape Nojima or in the adjacent offshore area.

The source fault is estimated to have extended deep beneath the inland areas of the Shōnan region, and the strongest shaking is believed to have been experienced in the Odawara area, where the maximum intensity is estimated to have reached shindo 7. Most areas of Tokyo are estimated to have experienced shaking of approximately shindo 6.

== Estimation of recurrence interval ==
Because Kantō earthquakes are characterized by uplift in specific areas during each event, numerous attempts have been made to estimate their recurrence interval using geological evidence preserved along the coastline.

Matsuda (1985, 1993) classified megathrust earthquakes occurring along the Sagami Trough into three types: the Genroku-type, Taishō-type, and Ōiso-type earthquakes. He proposed that Genroku-type earthquakes occur along the Sagami Trough between Sagami Bay and the Bōsō Peninsula, with a recurrence interval of 1,000–1,500 years. Taishō-type earthquakes originate in the Sagami Bay region and have an estimated recurrence interval of 800 ± 400 years. Ōiso-type earthquakes occur along the Kannawa–Kōzu–Matsuda Fault Zone and were estimated to recur at intervals of 170 ± 60 years.

Matsuda et al. (1974) argued that the rupture areas of Genroku-type and Taishō-type earthquakes are complementary to one another. Based on the amount of coseismic uplift observed in the coastal terraces at the southern tip of the Bōsō Peninsula, the elevation of marine terraces, and the average rate of interseismic subsidence, they estimated that the overall recurrence interval of great Kantō earthquakes, including both Genroku-type and Taishō-type events, is approximately 700–1,200 years. In 2003, Shishikura estimated from the emerged coastal landforms of southern Bōsō Peninsula that Genroku-type earthquakes, which produce extensive wave-cut platform uplift, recur at intervals of approximately 2,300 years, whereas Taishō-type earthquakes recur at intervals of about 400 years.

In contrast, Ishibashi (1977) argued that the rupture areas of Genroku-type and Taishō-type earthquakes are not complementary in the sense that one encompasses the other. He also suggested that if the interval between earthquakes is too short for sufficient marine erosion to occur, distinct flat coastal surfaces may not develop. On this basis, he estimated that the recurrence interval could be as short as 200–300 years. In 1976, Seno estimated the recurrence interval of Taishō-type earthquakes to be approximately 220 years based on the relative motion of tectonic plates and the amount of fault slip during earthquakes. In 1977, by comparing the uplift of coastal terraces in southern Bōsō Peninsula, the amount of uplift immediately after earthquakes, and the subsequent subsidence caused by postseismic rebound, Seno estimated the recurrence interval of Taishō-type earthquakes to be 180–400 years and that of Genroku-type earthquakes to be approximately 950–2,500 years.

In 2012, Fujiwara considered four Sagami Trough earthquakes—the 878 Sagami–Musashi earthquake, the 1293 Kamakura earthquake, the 1703 Genroku earthquake, and the 1923 Great Kantō earthquake—and estimated their recurrence interval to range from a minimum of 220 years to a maximum of 415 years. Tetsuzo Seno further argued that the Genroku and Taishō earthquakes occurred with a recurrence interval that was close to the minimum possible interval between such events.

== Relationship with other characteristic earthquakes ==
In several cases, great earthquakes or volcanic eruptions occurred around the same time as past Sagami Trough megathrust earthquakes or earthquakes inferred to have been associated with them. Researchers who argued that the 1495 Meiō earthquake was likely a Kantō earthquake also suggested that megathrust earthquakes along the Sagami Trough and the Nankai Trough may occur as coupled earthquakes. Ishibashi likewise argued that although the recurrence cycles of Sagami Trough and Nankai Trough megathrust earthquakes are independent of one another, rupture along the plate boundary of the Sagami Trough could deliver a final stress perturbation to the portion of the Philippine Sea Plate involved in the Nankai Trough fault system. If the timing is favorable, this could trigger a cascading sequence of fault ruptures.

Historically, the 878 Sagami–Musashi earthquake, which may have occurred on the Isehara Fault or along the Sagami Trough, took place nine years after the 869 Jōgan earthquake, a coupled earthquake event along the Japan Trench. Nine years later, in 887, the Ninna earthquake, which is believed to have been a megathrust earthquake along the Nankai Trough, occurred. In addition, the 1495 Meiō earthquake (also known as the Meiō Kantō earthquake), which is thought to have occurred in southern Kantō, took place three years before the 1498 Meiō earthquake, a megathrust earthquake along the Nankai Trough. One hypothesis holds that the 1495 event occurred along the Sagami Trough.

Four years after the 1703 Genroku earthquake, the 1707 Hōei earthquake, a megathrust earthquake affecting both the Sagami Trough and the Nankai Trough, occurred. It was followed shortly thereafter by the Hōei eruption, the most recent eruption of Mount Fuji in recorded history. Professor Masataka Ando and Professor Kiyoo Mogi argued that the 1703 Genroku earthquake increased stress along the Nankai Trough and may have contributed to triggering the 1707 Hōei earthquake. In addition, although the 1855 Ansei Edo earthquake is not considered a Sagami Trough megathrust earthquake, it was preceded by the 1854 Ansei-Tōkai earthquake and the 1854 Ansei Nankai earthquake, both of which occurred one year earlier.

== See also ==
- Sagami Trough
- Nankai megathrust earthquakes
  - Tōkai earthquake
  - Tōnankai earthquake
  - Nankai earthquake
- Sanriku earthquakes
