= South Kantō earthquakes =

General term used in describing earthquake in the Kantō region

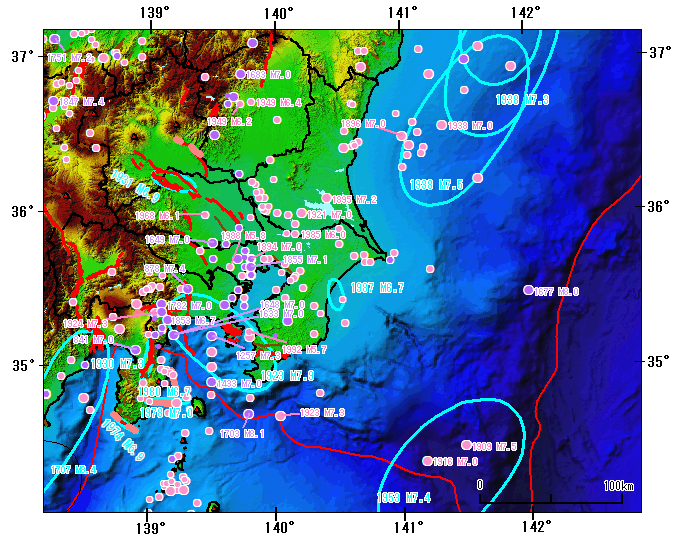
Major earthquakes that occurred in the Kanto region in the past

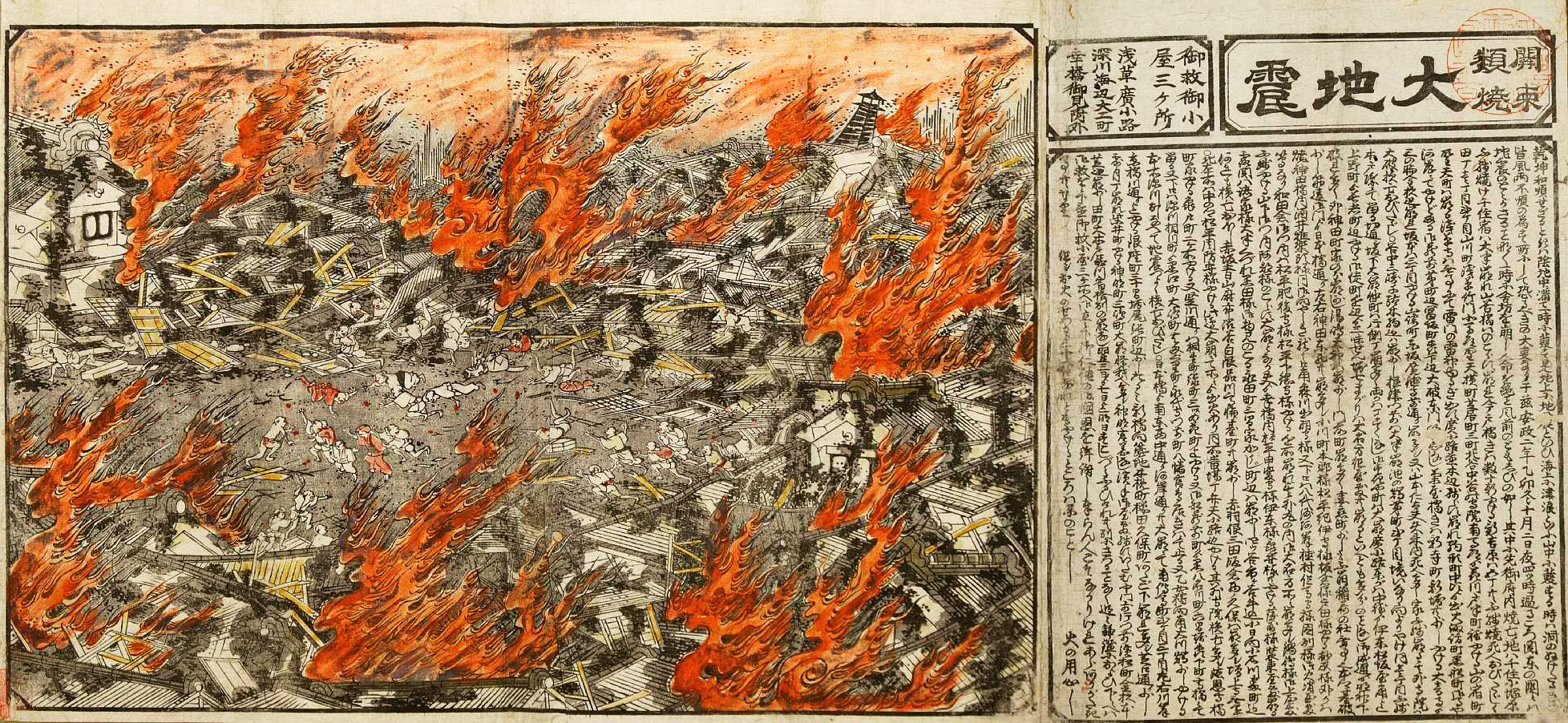
Ansei Great Earthquake, 1855.

South Kantō earthquakes (Japanese: 南関東直下地震) or Greater Tokyo Area earthquakes (Japanese: 首都直下地震) are general terms for major earthquakes that occurs repeatedly historically in the southern part of Kanto region (Tokyo, Kanagawa, Chiba, Saitama, etc., Greater Tokyo Area) in Japan. It has been announced that there is a 70% chance that earthquakes of about M7 will occur in the southern part of the Kanto region within the next 30 years.

As Tokyo (Greater Tokyo Area) is one of the largest cities in the world (populated area), if a large earthquake occurs in the southern part of the Kanto region, the damage is expected to be enormous. And also, indirect damage caused by the earthquake is thought to extend to the entire world for a long period of time. It has been announced that if a large earthquake occurs in the Greater Tokyo Area, it would kill 23,000 people in the worst-case scenario.

== Major earthquakes in the past ==
This is a list of major earthquakes that have caused damage to the southern part of the Kanto region in the past.

- 1293 Kamakura earthquake
- 1703 Genroku earthquake
- 1855 Edo earthquake
- 1894 Tokyo earthquake
- 1923 Great Kantō earthquake

== See also ==
- Sagami Trough
