= Abe Great Falls =

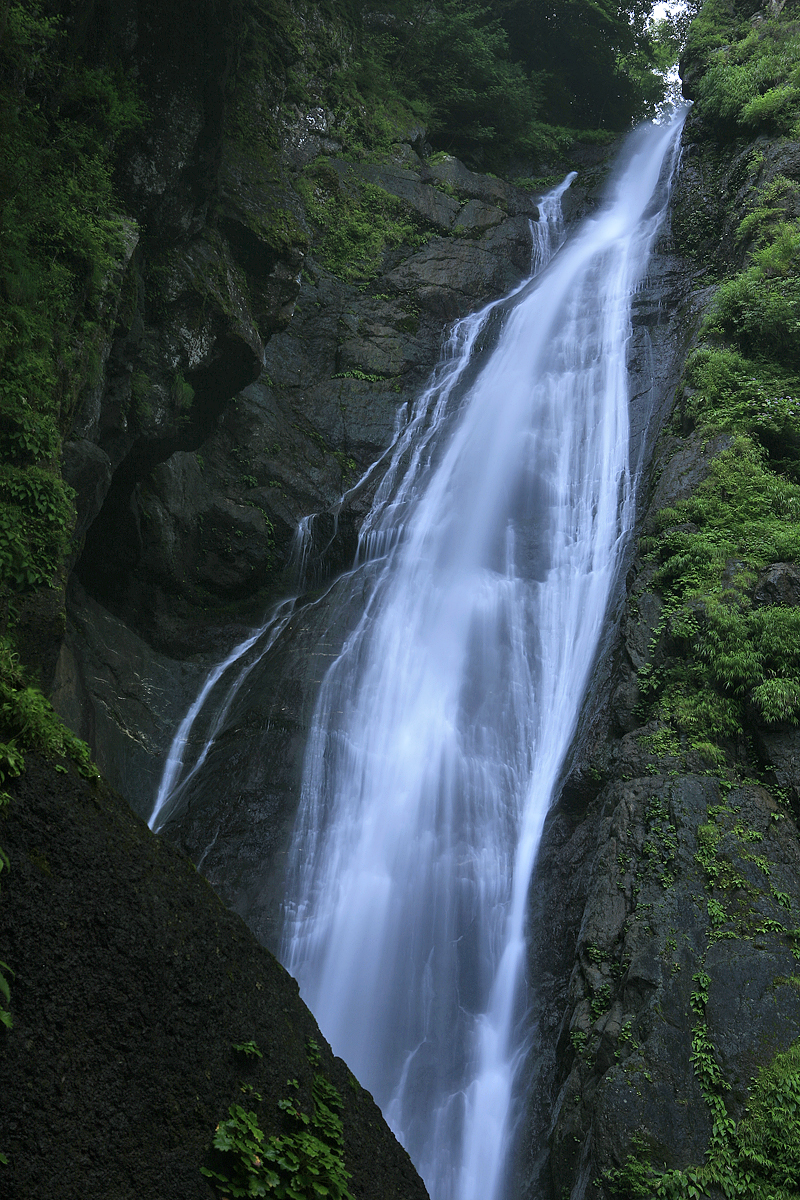
- Abe-no-Ōtaki

- Location within Japan
- Location: Aoi-ku, Shizuoka; Shizuoka Prefecture, Japan
- Coordinates: 35°17′59″N 138°21′06″E
- Type: cascade
- Total height: 80 m (260 ft)
- Average width: 4 m (13 ft)
- Watercourse: Abe River

Abe Great Falls (安倍の大滝, Abe-no-Ōtaki) is a waterfall in northern Aoi-ku, Shizuoka, Japan, in the upper reaches of the Abe River. It is also sometimes referred to as the Suruga Great Falls (駿河大滝, Suruga-no-Ōtaki) or the Otome Falls (乙女の滝, Otome-no-taki). It is located near the Umegashima onsen resort area.

The Abe Great Falls is listed as one of the "Japan’s Top 100 Waterfalls", in a listing published by the Japanese Ministry of the Environment in 1990.

== See also ==
- List of waterfalls
- List of waterfalls in Japan
