= Sagami Trough =

Geological plate boundary near Japan

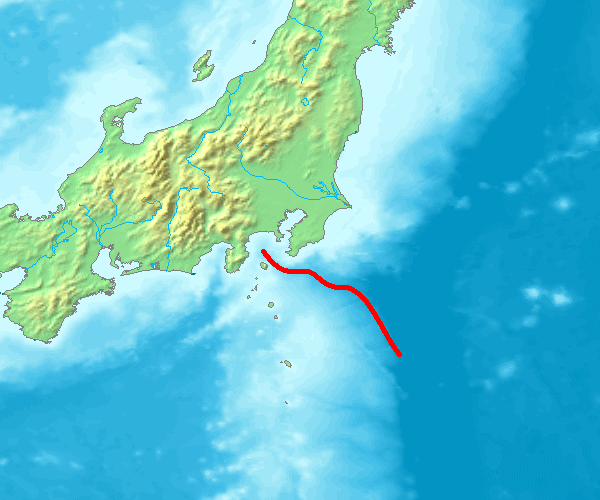
Red line is the Sagami Trough

The Sagami Trough (相模トラフ, Sagami Torafu) also Sagami Trench, Sagami Megathrust, or Sagami Subduction Zone is a 340-kilometre (210 mi) long trough, which is the surface expression of the convergent plate boundary where the Philippine Sea plate is being subducted under the Okhotsk microplate. It stretches from the Boso triple junction in the east, where it meets the Japan Trench, to Sagami Bay in the west, where it meets the Nankai Trough. It runs north of the Izu Islands chain and the Izu–Bonin–Mariana Arc (IBM).

Megathrust earthquakes associated with the Sagami Trough, known as Kantō earthquakes, are a major threat to Tokyo and the Kantō region because of the proximity to a population center (with over 36 million living in Tokyo's metro area, with a total of 43 million living in the Kanto Region) and the magnitude the Sagami Trough can create.

== Kanto Earthquakes in the Region ==
The Sagami Trough megathrust generated the 1293 Kamakura earthquake, the 1703 Genroku earthquake, which was the greatest rupture along the trough in the last thousand years, and the 1855 (Ansei) and 1923 (Great Kanto or Taisho) earthquakes.

The earliest identified Kanto earthquakes originating along the Sagami Trough date back to 878, 1293, 1433, with the two most recent having occurred in 1703 and 1923. The first recorded event of the Kanto region is the 878 Gangyo earthquake that occurred on October 28, 878. In the Nihon-sandai-jitsuroku record, it's detailed that ground shook for several days tearing into Kanto, Sagami, and Musashi provinces, and the ground subsided . Evidence of this account was brought forth in the 1980s by researchers that drilled along the Isehara fault where they found 1.6 m offset within range of the Gangyo earthquake time period. The Eikyo earthquake in 1433 caused a significant amount of damage in the Kanto region including Kyoto. For the next 20 days outside regions experience aftershocks that cause landslides, as well as buildings in Kanto to fall down, with many casualties. There is no known record of a resultant tsunami.

In addition to middle age and medieval recurrence interval of the Kanto region earthquakes, there were known seismic events in 1703 and 1923. The Genroku Kanto Earthquake occurred on December 31, 1703 with a magnitude of 8.2 off the SW Boso Peninsula. The Genroku Kanto Earthquake was the result of a rupture along a 120 km fault offshore of the Sagami Trough, close to the Japan trench, associated with subduction of the Philippine Plate under Japanese islands. A tsunami was observed along the coast of the Sagami Bay, where the Sagami Trough originates out of, and the Boso Peninsula. The tsunami reached the Boso Peninsula, adjacent to the Sagami Trough, at a height of 6-11 m. The total casualties were estimated to be around 10,000 and the earthquake could be felt in Fukushima, Kanagwa, Tokyo, Tochigi, Shizouka, Ibaraki, Chiba, Saitama, and Yamanashi. A recently documented megathrust earthquake in the region is the Great Kanto Earthquake that occurred on September 1, 1923. The earthquake had a magnitude of 7.9 and was an interplate earthquake associated with subduction of the Philippine plate under the Okhotsk plate along the Sagami Trough. There were over 150,000 casualties that were mainly the result of a fire that broke out as a result of the shaking in the Tokyo area. The earthquake as well propagated a tsunami that was 5 m tall and moved along the coast of the Sagami Bay. Compiling together, the average recurrence interval for Great Kanto earthquakes as previously detailed is 200-400 years.

== See also ==
- Suruga Trough
