= Suruga Bay =

Large body of water in the Pacific Ocean

Coordinates: 34°51′N 138°33′E

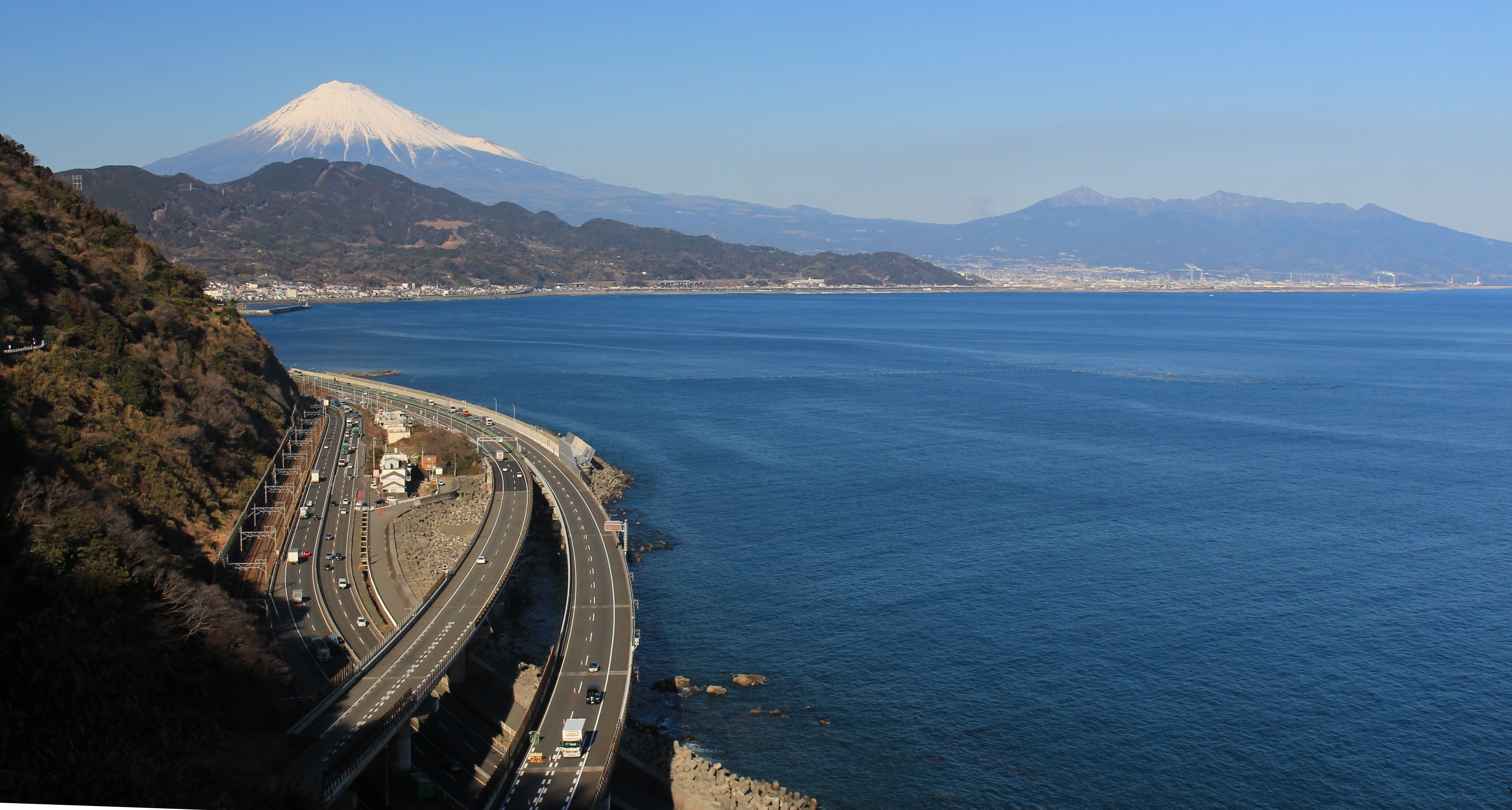
Mount Fuji and Suruga Bay

Suruga Bay (駿河湾, Suruga-wan) is a bay on the Pacific coast of Honshū in Shizuoka Prefecture, Japan. It is situated north of a straight lt and west and the Izu Peninsula to the east.

== Geology ==
Location of Suruga Bay

Suruga Bay contains the Suruga Trough which runs up the middle of the bay, Japan's deepest trough.

Numerous rivers—including the Fuji, Ōi, and Abe rivers—empty into the western portion carving out submarine canyons. At the bay's easternmost end, the Kano River empties into a pocket called Uchiura-wan at Numazu, Shizuoka. The eastern end holds a number of small rocky islands, some joined to the mainland by tombolos.

The western and central sections of the Suruga Bay coastline, roughly from Shizuoka to Numazu, are characterized by sandy beaches such as those at Yuigahama and Tagonoura, whereas the eastern and northeastern stretches from Numazu down the southwestern coast of the Izu Peninsula to Irōzaki, are generally rocky.

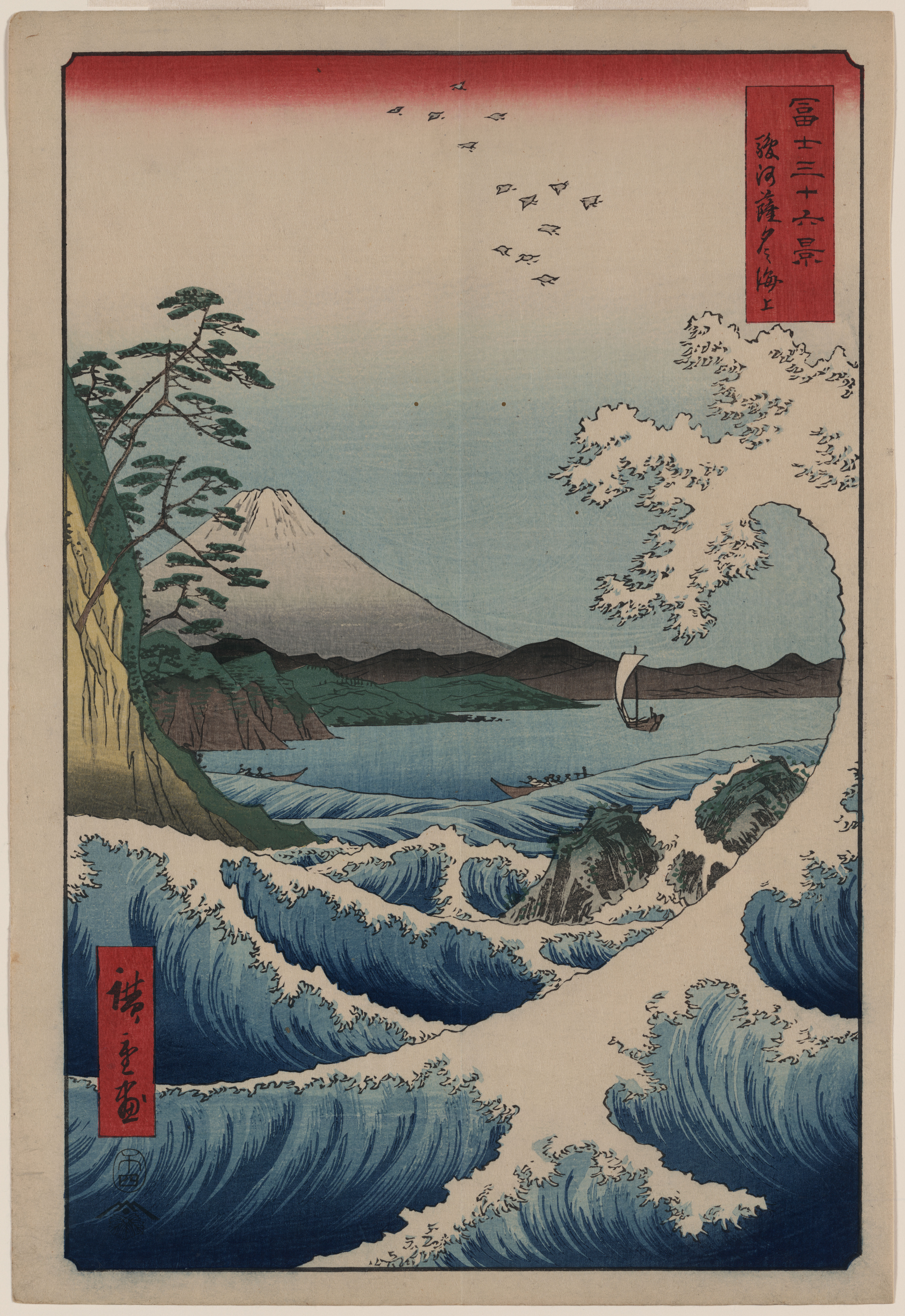
Suruga, Satta no Kaijō (The sea off Satta, Suruga), woodblock print by Hiroshige

The bay is open to the Philippine Sea/Pacific Ocean to the south, but is mostly protected from oceanic waves by Izu Peninsula. This, coupled with the seabed and water characteristics mentioned above, results in conditions favorable to fishing, sailing, windsurfing, swimming, and research on deep-sea organisms. An undersea plateau at the bay's southwest end, known as Senoumi, is especially well known as a rich fishing ground.

Suruga Bay was formed by tectonic subduction of the Philippine Sea Plate and the Eurasian Plate at the Suruga Trough, making it a source of considerable seismic activity, and giving the bay its extreme depth.

== Environmental pollution ==
Ever since the post-war industrial boom of Japan, the bay has suffered from severe industrial pollution. By 1970, local paper mills in Fuji produced produced 2.4 million short tons (2.2 Mt) of waste water every day – equivalent to the daily sewage of Tokyo at the time. The sulphur-laden sludge was so thick that it threatened to block the harbour, requiring dredging that severely damaged the marine life. Protests from local citizens and fishermen in the area put pressure on the government to take action. Despite subsequent regulations, surveys of local sea life in the mid-2010s continue to show intense PCB and PBDE contamination.

The pollution of Suruga Bay became so infamous that it featured in the 1971 film Godzilla vs. Hedorah. The name of the titular monster is derived from hedoro, the Japanese word for 'mud', and the creature fed off heavy pollution in the bay.

== Transport ==
Suruga Bay can be reached by car from Tokyo via Numazu in two to five hours depending on traffic conditions on the Tōmei Expressway or in Numazu.
