= Abe River =

River in Shizuoka Prefecture, Japan

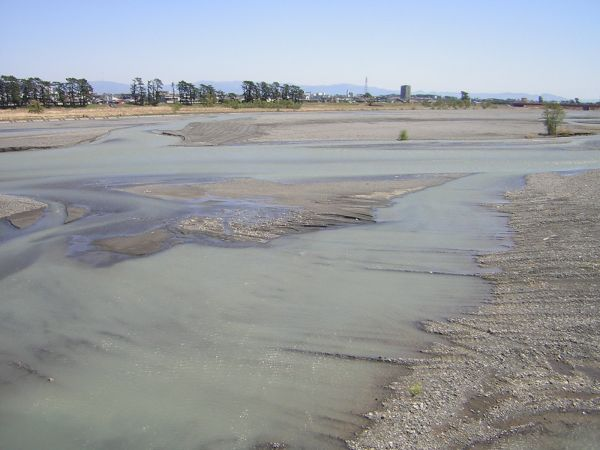
- Abe River at Shizuoka

- Native name: 安倍川 (Japanese)

Location
- Country: Japan

Physical characteristics
- Source
  - location: Akaishi Mountains
  - elevation: 2,000 m (6,600 ft)
- Mouth
  - location: Suruga Bay
  - elevation: 0 m (0 ft)
- Length: 53.3 km (33.1 mi)
- Basin size: 567 km^{2} (219 sq mi)

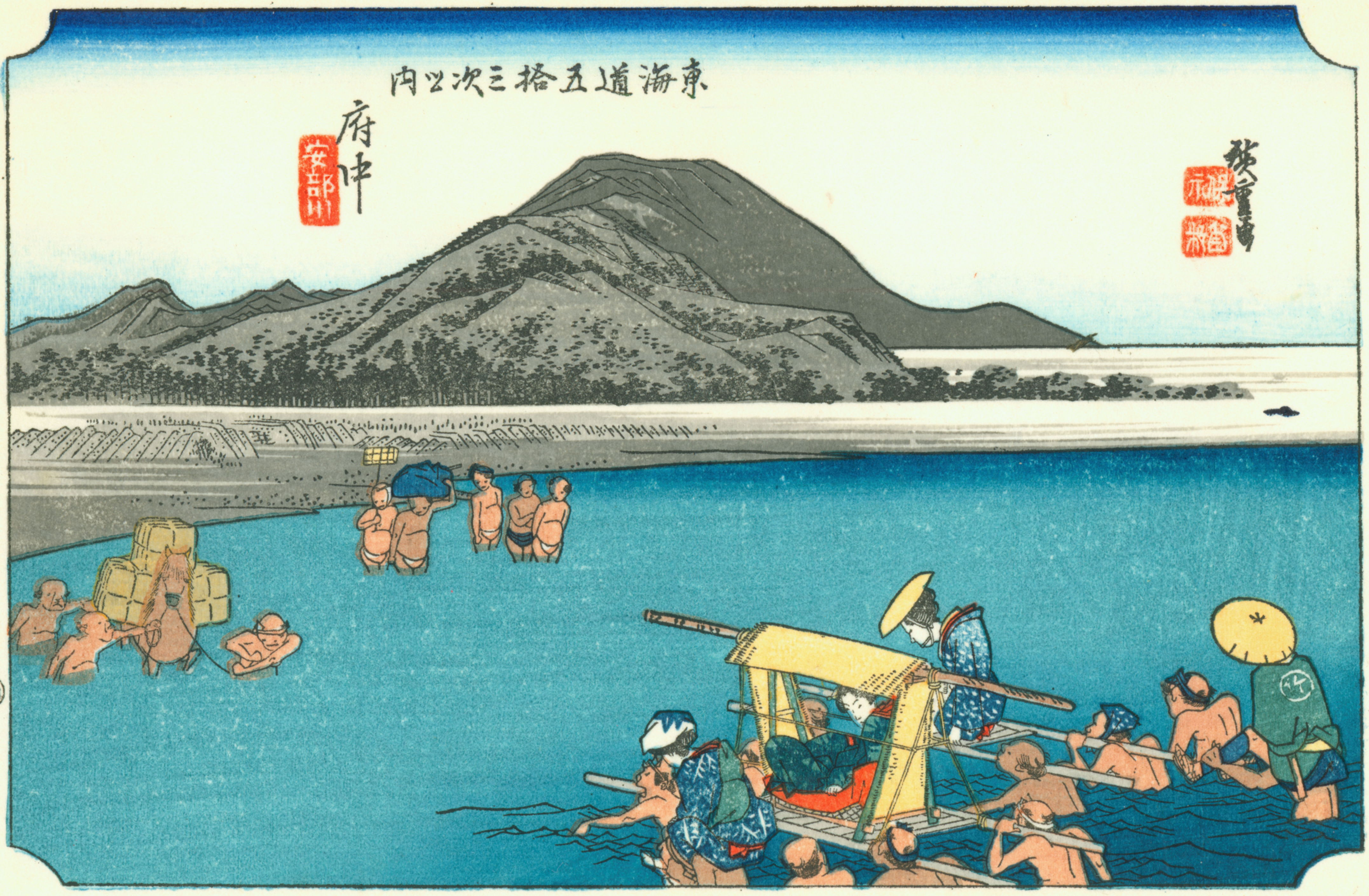
Hiroshige

The Abe River (安倍川, Abe-kawa) is a Class A river in Shizuoka Prefecture in central Japan. It is 53.3 kilometres (33.1 mi) long and has a drainage basin of 567 square kilometres (219 sq mi). Approximately 170,000 people live in the basin area.

The river rises in the Akaishi Mountains, which stretch over the boundary between Yamanashi and Shizuoka Prefectures, and flows into Suruga Bay in the Pacific Ocean. It is known for its clear stream and forms part of the main water supply for Shizuoka city.

There are many hot springs at the river head, which is also known for its numerous landslides and for the Abe Great Falls, one of Japan's Top 100 Waterfalls. Unlike the nearby Tenryū River and Ōi River, there are no dams on the Abe River.

Tokugawa Ieyasu carried out extensive construction and formed the present route of the lower course of the river. Abekawamochi (安倍川餅), a mochi rice cake dusted with kinako (soybean flour), has been a local speciality of this area since at least the Edo period.

The river's mouth is at 34°55′47″N 138°23′38″E.
