= Kamakura period =

Period of Japanese history from CE 1185 to 1333

The Kamakura period (鎌倉時代, Kamakura jidai; 1185–1333) is a period of Japanese history that marks the governance by the Kamakura shogunate, officially established in 1192 in Kamakura by the first shōgun Minamoto no Yoritomo after the conclusion of the Genpei War, which saw the struggle between the Taira and Minamoto clans. The period is known for the emergence of the samurai, the warrior caste, and for the establishment of feudalism in Japan.

There are various theories as to the year in which the Kamakura period and Kamakura shogunate began. In the past, the most popular theory was that the year was 1192, when Minamoto no Yoritomo was appointed Seii Taishōgun (征夷大将軍). Later, the prevailing theory was that the year was 1185, when Yoritomo established the Shugo (守護), which controlled military and police power in various regions, and the Jitō (地頭), which was in charge of tax collection and land administration. Japanese history textbooks as of 2016 do not specify a specific year for the beginning of the Kamakura period, as there are various theories about the year the Kamakura shogunate was established.

During the early Kamakura period, the shogunate continued warfare against the Northern Fujiwara which was only defeated in 1189. Then, the authority of the Kamakura rulers waned in the 1190s and power was transferred to the powerful Hōjō clan in the early 13th century with the head of the clan as regent (Shikken) under the shogun which became a powerless figurehead. The later Kamakura period saw the invasions of the Mongols in 1274 and again in 1281. To reduce the amount of chaos, the Hōjō rulers decided to decentralize power by allowing two imperial lines – Northern and Southern court, to alternate the throne. In the 1330s, the Southern court under Emperor Go-Daigo revolted and eventually led to the Siege of Kamakura in 1333 which ended the rule of the shogunate. With this, the Kamakura period ended. There was a short re-establishment (1333–1336) of imperial rule under Go-Daigo assisted by Ashikaga Takauji and Nitta Yoshisada but would later lead to direct rule under Ashikaga, forming the Ashikaga shogunate in the succeeding Muromachi period.

Several significant administrative achievements were made during the Hōjō regency. These provided the opportunities for other military lords to exercise judicial and legislative authority and the government established a council centered around collective leadership. The period saw the adoption of Japan's first military code of law in 1232. There was an expansion of Buddhist teachings into Old Buddhism (Kyū Bukkyō) and New Buddhism (Shin Bukkyō).

== Shogunate and Hōjō regency ==
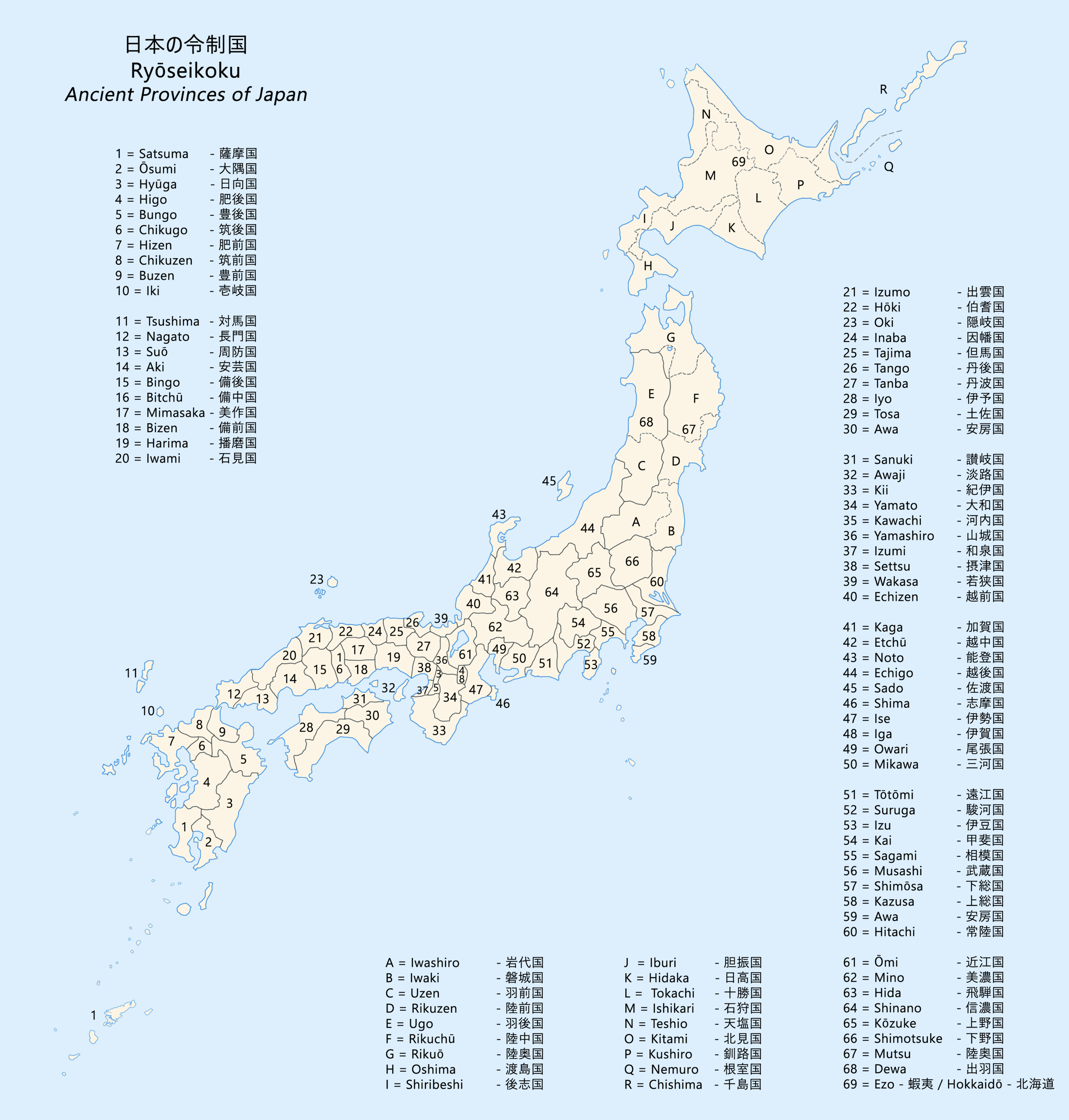
Provinces in the Kamakura period (excluding Hokkaido and the Satsunan Islands)

The Kamakura period marked Japan's transition to a land-based economy and the concentration of advanced military technologies in the hands of a specialized fighting class. Lords required the loyal services of vassals, who were rewarded with fiefs of their own; the fief holders then exercised local military rule. Once Minamoto no Yoritomo had consolidated his power, he established a new government at his family home in Kamakura. He called his government a bakufu (幕府, tent government), but because he was given the ancient high military title Sei-i Taishōgun by Emperor Go-Toba, the government is often referred to in Western literature as the Shogunate. Yoritomo followed the Fujiwara form of house government and had an administrative board (政所, Mandokoro), a board of retainers (侍所, Samurai-dokoro), and a board of inquiry (問注所, Monchūjo). After confiscating estates in central and western Japan, he appointed stewards for the estates and constables for the provinces. As shōgun, Yoritomo was both the steward and the constable general.

The Kamakura shogunate was not a national regime, however, and although it controlled large tracts of land, there was strong resistance to the stewards. The regime continued warfare against the Northern Fujiwara, but never brought either the north or the west under complete military control. However, the fourth leader of the Northern Fujiwara Fujiwara no Yasuhira was defeated by Yoritomo in 1189, and the 100-year-long prosperity of the north disappeared. The old court resided in Kyoto, continuing to hold the land over which it had jurisdiction, while newly organized military families were attracted to Kamakura.

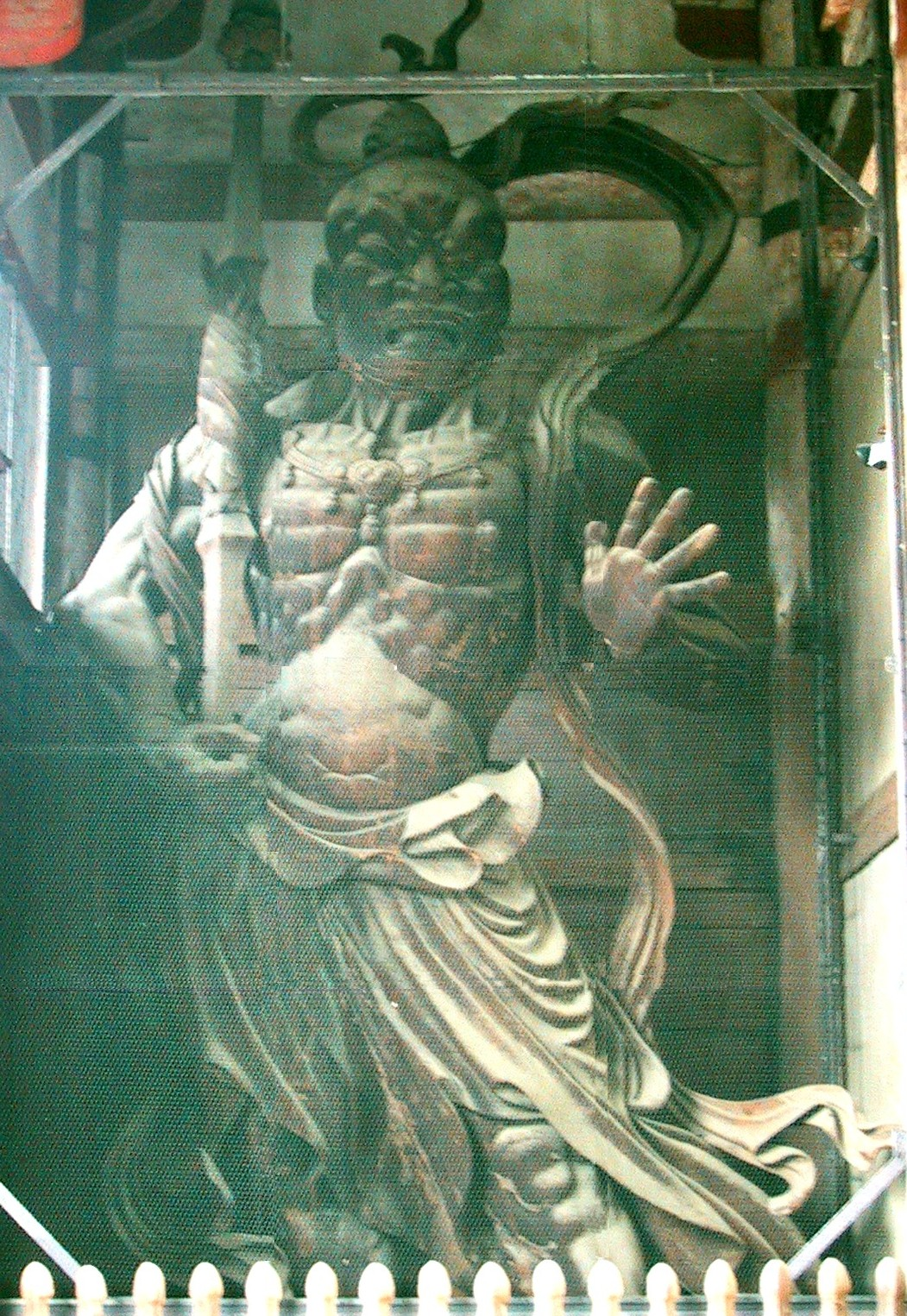
A famous Japanese wooden kongorikishi statue of Tōdai-ji, Nara. It was made by Busshi Unkei in 1203.

Despite a strong beginning, Yoritomo failed to consolidate the leadership of his family on a lasting basis. Intrafamily contention had long existed within the Minamoto, although Yoritomo had eliminated most serious challengers to his authority. When he died suddenly in 1199, his son Minamoto no Yoriie became shōgun and nominal head of the Minamoto, but Yoriie was unable to control the other eastern warrior families. By the early 13th century, a regency had been established by Hōjō Tokimasa—a member of the Hōjō clan, a branch of the Taira that had allied itself with the Minamoto in 1180. The head of Hōjō was installed as a regent for the shōgun; the regent was termed the Shikken during the period, although later positions were created with similar power such as the Tokusō and the Rensho. Often the Shikken was also the Tokusō and Rensho. Under the Hōjō, the shōgun became a powerless figurehead.

With the protection of the Emperor, a figurehead himself, strains emerged between Kyoto and Kamakura, and in 1221 the Jōkyū War broke out between the cloistered Emperor Go-Toba and the second regent Hōjō Yoshitoki. The Hōjō forces easily won the war, and the imperial court was brought under the direct control of the shogunate. The shōgun's constables gained greater civil powers, and the court was obliged to seek Kamakura's approval for all of its actions. Although deprived of political power, the court retained extensive estates.

Several significant administrative achievements were made during the Hōjō regency. In 1225 the third regent Hōjō Yasutoki established the Council of State, providing opportunities for other military lords to exercise judicial and legislative authority within the Kamakura regime. The Hōjō regent presided over the council, which was a successful form of collective leadership. The adoption of Japan's first military code of law—the Goseibai Shikimoku—in 1232 reflected the profound transition from court to militarized society. While legal practices in Kyoto were still based on 500-year-old Confucian principles, the new code was a highly legalistic document that stressed the duties of stewards and constables, provided means for settling land disputes, and established rules governing inheritances. It was clear and concise, stipulated punishments for violators of its conditions, and parts of it remained in effect for the next 635 years.

As might be expected, the literature of the time reflected the unsettled nature of the period. The Hōjōki describes the turmoil of the period in terms of the Buddhist concepts of impermanence and the vanity of human projects. The Heike Monogatari narrated the rise and fall of the Taira clan, replete with tales of wars and samurai deeds. A second literary mainstream was the continuation of anthologies of poetry in the Shin Kokin Wakashū, of which twenty volumes were produced between 1201 and 1205.

== Expansion of Buddhist teachings ==
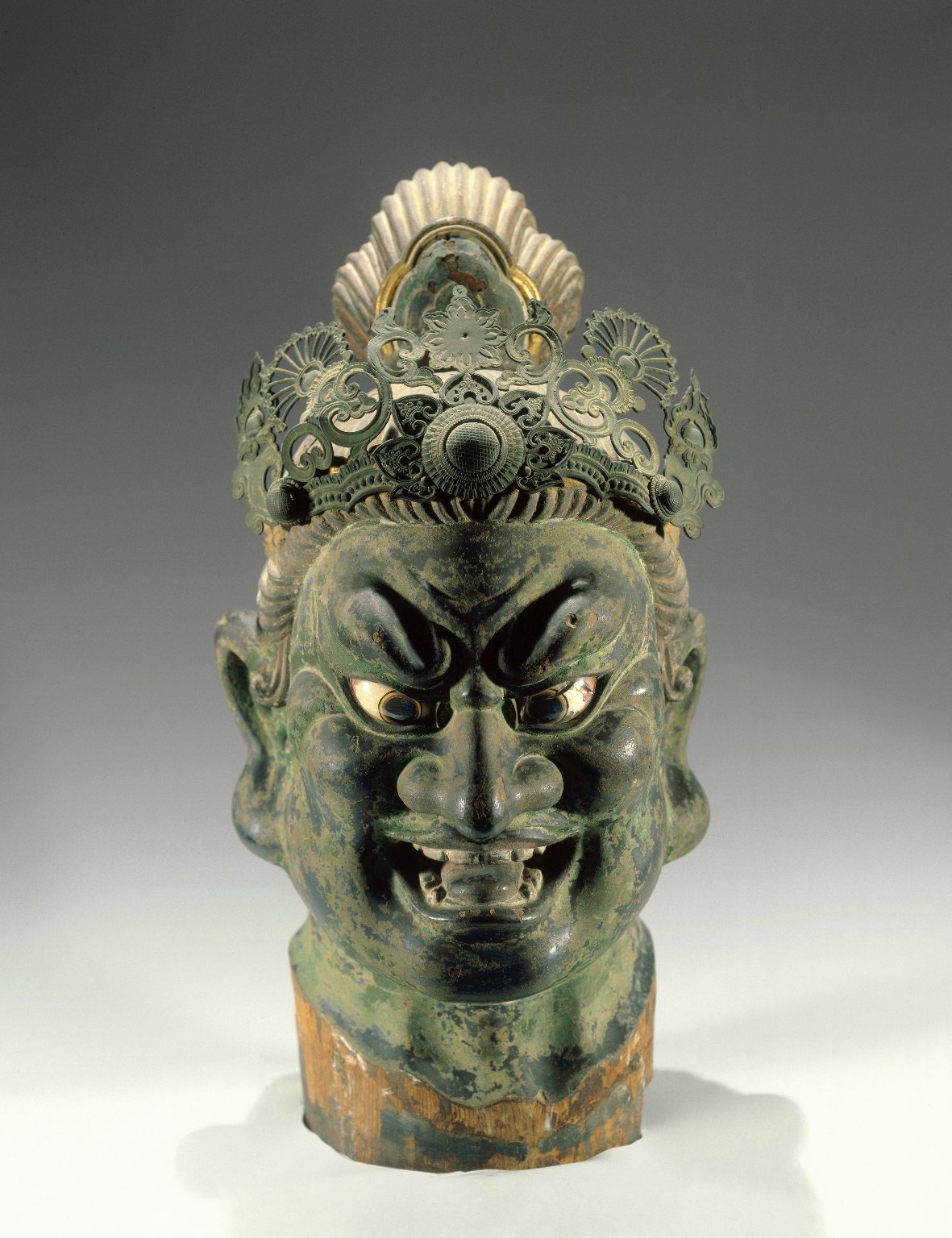
Head of a Guardian, 13th century. Hinoki wood with lacquer on cloth, pigment, rock crystal, metal. Before entering most Japanese Buddhist temples, visitors must pass large and imposing sculptures of ferocious guardian figures whose role is to protect the premises from the enemies of the religion. The aggressive stances and exaggerated facial features of these figures stand in sharp contrast to the calm demeanor of the Buddha enshrined inside. Brooklyn Museum

During the Kamakura period six new Buddhist schools (classified by scholars as "New Buddhism" or Shin Bukkyo) were founded:

- Hōnen (1133–1212) founded the Japanese Pure Land school or Jōdo-shū.
- Eisai (1141–1215) founded the Rinzai school of Zen.
- Shinran (1173–1263) founded the Jōdo Shinshū sect.
- Dōgen (1200–1253) founded the Sōtō school of Zen.
- Nichiren (1222–1282) founded the Nichiren school.
- Ippen (1239–1289) founded the Ji-shū branch of Pure Land Buddhism.

During this time the pre-existing schools of Tendai, founded by Saichō (767–822), Shingon, founded by Kūkai (774–835), and the great temples of Nara, collectively classified by scholars as "Old Buddhism" or Kyū Bukkyo, continued to thrive, adapt, and exert influence. For example, all of the above six reformers had studied at the Tendai Mt. Hiei at some point in their lives.

=== "Old Buddhism" (Kyū Bukkyō) ===
Throughout the Kamakura period, older Buddhist sects including Shingon, Tendai, and the Nara temple schools such as Kegon, Hossō, Sanron, and Ritsu continued to thrive and adapt to the trend of the times.

At the start of the Kamakura period, the Mount Hiei monasteries had become politically powerful, appealing primarily to those capable of systematic study of the sect's teachings. The Shingon sect and its esoteric ritual continued to enjoy support largely from the noble families in Kyoto. However, with the increasing popularity of the new Kamakura schools, the older schools were partially eclipsed as the newer "Kamakura" schools found followers among the new Kamakura government, and its samurai.

The times that gave way to the Kamakura period were marked by political and military conflict, natural disasters, and social malaise attributed to the perceived arrival of the Latter Day of the Law. The new social order of a declining aristocracy and ascending military and peasant classes resulted in new forms of religion, both indigenous and Buddhist while Indian and Chinese influence continued. Furthermore, the Shōen manor system which had taken root in this era resulted in the increased prosperity and literacy of peasants which in turn provided more financial support for Buddhist teachers and their studies.

=== "New Buddhism" (Shin Bukkyō) ===
The first originators of Kamakura Buddhism schools were Hōnen and Shinran who emphasized belief and practice over formalism.

In the latter part of the 12th-century Dōgen and Eisai traveled to China and upon their return to Japan founded, respectively, the Sōtō and Rinzai schools of Zen. Dōgen rejected affiliations with the secular authorities whereas Eisai actively sought them. Whereas Eisai thought that Zen teachings would revitalize the Tendai school, Dōgen aimed for an ineffable absolute, a pure Zen teaching that was not tied to beliefs and practices from Tendai or other orthodox schools and with little guidance for leading people how to live in the secular world.

The final stage of Kamakura Buddhism, occurring some 50 years after Hōnen, was marked by new social and political conditions as the aristocracy declined, the military class asserted new influence, and Buddhist-infused local kami practice among peasants flourished. These changing conditions created a climate that encouraged religious innovation. Nichiren and Ippen attempted at this time to create down-to-earth teachings that were rooted in the daily concerns of people. Nichiren rejected the focus on "next-worldly" salvation such a rebirth in a Pure Land and instead aimed for "this-worldly" personal and national liberation through a simple and accessible practice. Ippen emphasized a popularized form of nenbutsu recitation with an emphasis on practice rather than concentrating on an individual's underlying mental state.

=== Legacy of Kamakura Buddhism ===
As time evolved the distinctions between "Old" and "New" Buddhisms blurred as they formed "cultic centers" and various forms of founder worship. The medieval structures of these schools evolved into hierarchical head temple-branch temple structures with associated rituals and forms of worship. This culminated in the state-sanctioned formalized schools of the Tokugawa period.

== Mongol invasions ==
The repulsions of two invasions by the Mongol-led Yuan dynasty were momentous events in Japanese history. Nichiren had predicted these invasions years earlier, in his Rissho Ankoku Ron, a letter to the regency. Japanese relations with China had been terminated in the mid-ninth century after the deterioration of the Tang dynasty and the turning inward of the Heian court. Some commercial contacts were maintained with the Southern Song dynasty in later centuries, but Japanese pirates made the open seas dangerous. At a time when the shogunate had little interest in foreign affairs and ignored communications from China and the Goryeo dynasty, news arrived in 1268 of a new Mongol-led regime in Beijing. Its leader, Kublai, demanded that the Japanese pay tribute to the new Yuan dynasty and threatened reprisals if they failed to do so. Unused to such threats, Kyoto raised the diplomatic counter of Japan's divine origin, rejected the Yuan demands, dismissed the Goryeo messengers, and started defensive preparations.

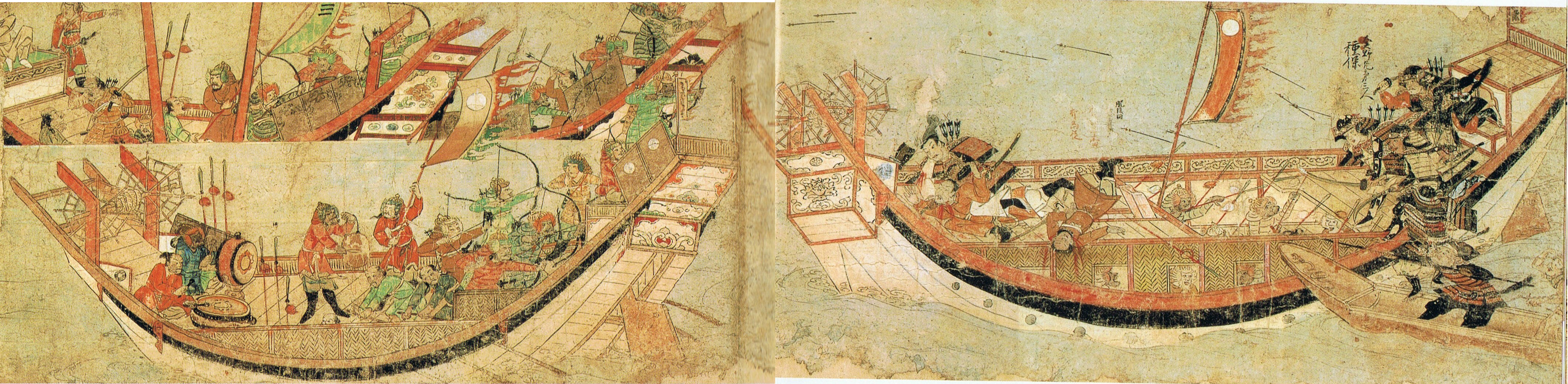
Japanese samurai boarding Mongol ships in 1281

After further unsuccessful entreaties, the first Mongol invasion took place in 1274. More than 600 ships carried a combined ethnic Mongol, Han, and Korean force of 23,000 troops armed with catapults, combustible missiles, and bows and arrows. In fighting, these soldiers grouped in close cavalry formations against samurai, who were accustomed to one-on-one combat. Local Japanese forces at Hakata, on northern Kyūshū, defended against the advantageous mainland force, which, after one day of fighting was destroyed by the onslaught of a sudden typhoon. Kublai realized that nature, not military incompetence, had been the cause of his forces' failure so, in 1281, he launched a second invasion. Seven weeks of fighting took place in northwestern Kyūshū before another typhoon struck, again destroying the Yuan fleet, which was mostly composed of hastily acquired, flat-bottomed Chinese ships especially vulnerable to powerful typhoons.

Although Shinto priests attributed the two defeats of the Mongols to a "divine wind" or kamikaze, a sign of heaven's special protection of Japan, the invasion left a deep impression on the shogunate leaders. Long-standing fears of the Chinese threat to Japan were reinforced. The victory also convinced the warriors of the value of the shogunate form of government.

The Yuan invasions had been a drain on the economy, and new taxes had to be levied to maintain defensive preparations for the future. The invasions also caused disaffection among those who expected recompense for their help in defeating the Yuan dynasty. There were no lands or other rewards to be given, however, and such disaffection, combined with overextension and the increasing defense costs, led to a decline of the Kamakura bakufu. Additionally, inheritances had divided family properties, and landowners increasingly had to turn to moneylenders for support. Roving bands of rōnin further threatened the stability of the shogunate.

== Civil war ==
The Hōjō reacted to the ensuing chaos by trying to place more power among the various great family clans. To further weaken the Kyoto court, the bakufu decided to allow two contending imperial lines—known as the Southern Court or junior line and the Northern Court or senior line—to alternate on the throne. The method worked for several successions until a member of the Southern Court ascended to the throne as Emperor Go-Daigo. Go-Daigo wanted to overthrow the shogunate, and he openly defied Kamakura by naming his own son his heir. In 1331 the shogunate exiled Go-Daigo, but loyalist forces, including Kusunoki Masashige, rebelled. They were aided by Ashikaga Takauji, a constable who turned against the Kamakura when dispatched to put down Go-Daigo's rebellion. At the same time, Nitta Yoshisada, another eastern chieftain, rebelled against the shogunate, which quickly disintegrated, and the Hōjō were defeated.

In the swell of victory, Go-Daigo endeavored to restore imperial authority and tenth-century Confucian practices. This period of reform, known as the Kenmu Restoration, aimed at strengthening the position of the emperor and reasserting the primacy of the court nobles over the warriors' caste. The reality, however, was that the forces who had arisen against Kamakura had been set on defeating the Hōjō, not on supporting the emperor. Ashikaga Takauji finally sided with the Northern Court in a civil war against the Southern Court represented by Go-Daigo. The long War Between the Courts lasted from 1336 to 1392. Early in the conflict, Go-Daigo was driven from Kyoto, and the Northern Court contender was installed by Ashikaga, who established a new line of shoguns.

== Events ==
- 1185: the rival Taira clan is defeated at sea at the Battle of Dan-no-ura by Yoritomo's brother Minamoto no Yoshitsune.
- 1192: The Emperor Go-Toba appoints Yoritomo as shōgun (military leader) with a residence in Kamakura, establishing the bakufu system of government.
- 1199: Minamoto no Yoritomo dies.
- 1207: Hōnen and his followers are exiled from Kyoto or executed. This inadvertently spread the Pure Land doctrine to a wider audience.
- 1221: The Kamakura army defeats the imperial army in the Jōkyū Disturbance, thereby asserting the supremacy of the Kamakura shogunate (Hōjō regents) over the emperor.
- 1227: The Sōtō sect of Zen Buddhism is introduced to Japan by monk Dōgen Zenji.
- 1232: The Jōei Shikimoku code of law is promulgated to enhance control by the Hōjō regents.
- 1271: Nichiren is banished to Sado Island.
- 1274 & 1281: The Mongols of Kublai Khan try to invade Japan but are repelled by a typhoon.
- 1293: On May 27, a major earthquake and tsunami hit Sagami Bay and Kamakura, killing 23,034 people. It followed a 1241 and 1257 earthquake/tsunami in the same general area, which both were of magnitude 7.0.
- 1333: Nitta Yoshisada conquers and destroys Kamakura during the Siege of Kamakura ending the Kamakura shogunate.
