= Suruga Trough =

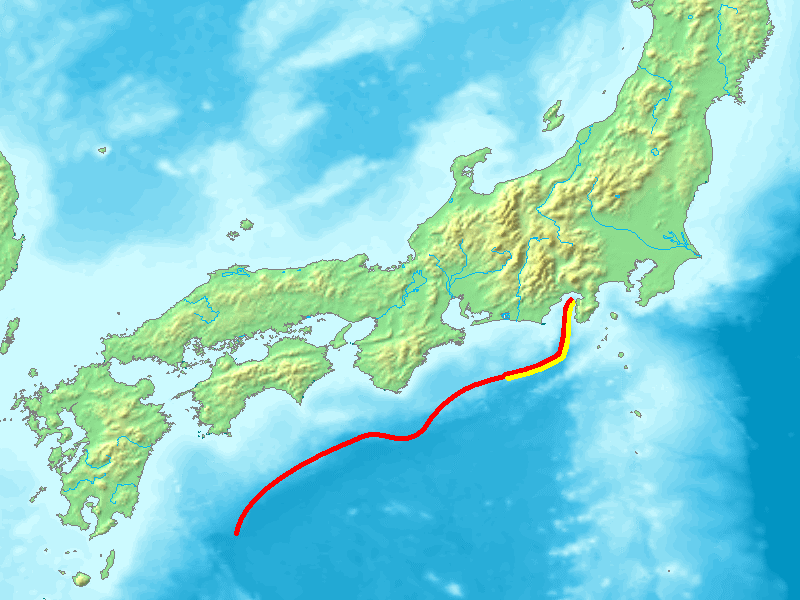
- The yellow line is the Suruga Trough, part of the longer Nankai Trough in red.
- Interactive map of Suruga Trough
- Location: Philippine Sea, off the coast of Shizuoka Prefecture, Japan
- Coordinates: 34°38′00.1″N 138°40′28.5″E
- Type: Oceanic trench / trough
- Etymology: Suruga Province
- Part of: Nankai Trough

The Suruga Trough (駿河トラフ, Suruga Torafu) is a tectonically active trough off Suruga Bay, Japan, forming the northern extension of the Nankai Trough. As part of the convergent boundary where the Philippine Sea Plate subducts beneath the Japanese islands, it experiences episodic seafloor disturbances .

== See also ==
- Japan Median Tectonic Line
- List of earthquakes in Japan
- Sagami Trough
