= 1293 Kamakura earthquake =

Earthquake and tsunami in Japan

- Location within Kanagawa Prefecture
- Local date: 27 May 1293
- Local time: 06:00
- Magnitude: 7.1
- Epicenter: 35.2°N 139.4°E
- Areas affected: Japan (Kamakura)
- Tsunami: Yes
- Casualties: 23,024

The 1293 Kamakura earthquake in Japan occurred at about 06:00 local time on 27 May 1293. It had an estimated magnitude of 7.1–7.5 and triggered a tsunami. The estimated death toll was 23,024. It occurred during the Kamakura period, and the city of Kamakura was seriously damaged.

In the confusion following the quake, Hōjō Sadatoki, the Shikken of the Kamakura shogunate, carried out a purge against his subordinate Taira no Yoritsuna. In what is referred to as the Heizen Gate Incident, Yoritsuna and 90 of his followers were killed.

It has been suggested that the reference to a large tsunami may be incorrect, although a tsunami deposit has been found that is consistent with this age.

== See also ==
- List of earthquakes in Japan
- List of historical earthquakes
- Sagami Trough
