= 1894 Tokyo earthquake =

Earthquake in Japan

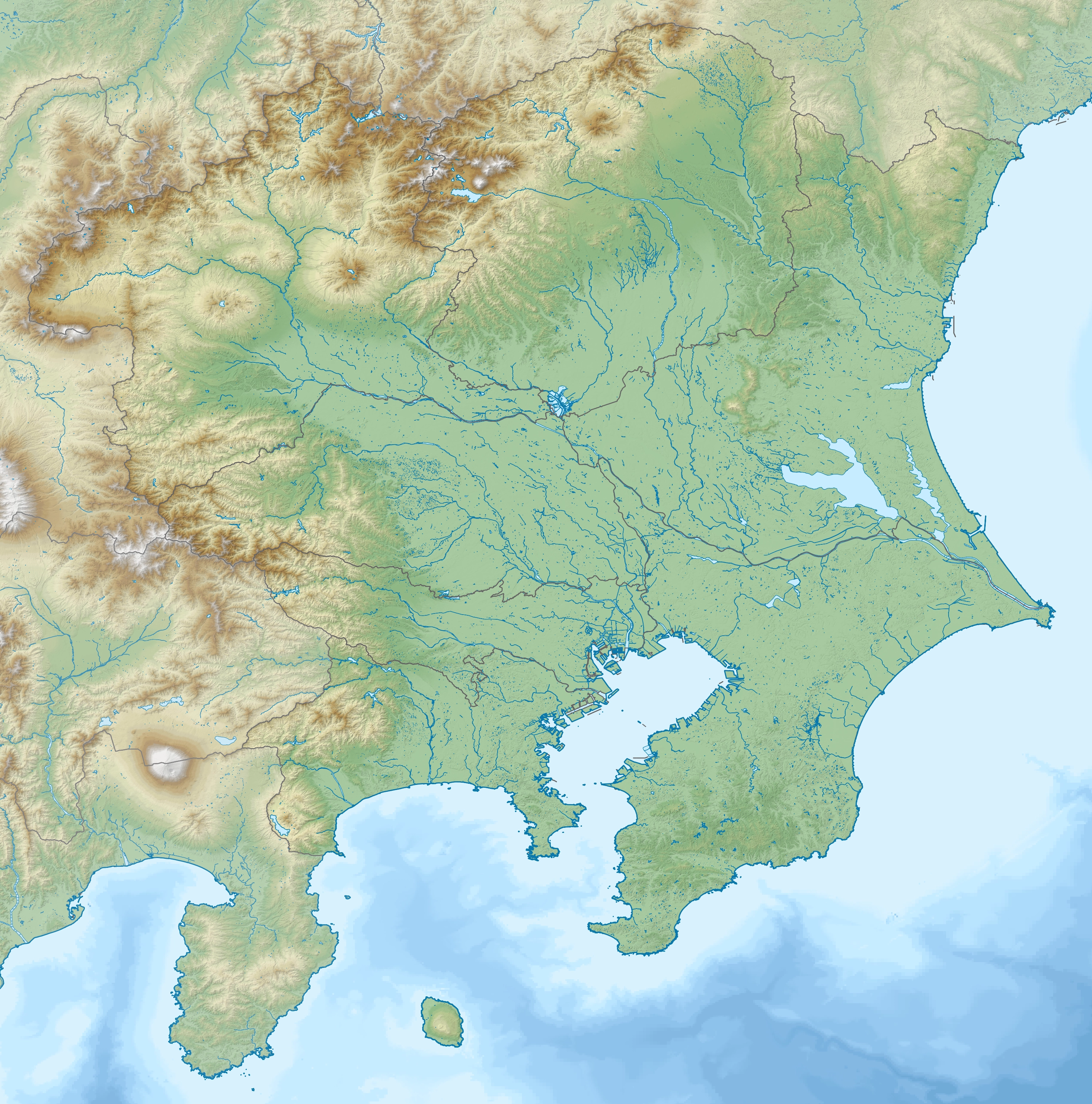
- Location within Kanto Area Location within Tokyo
- UTC time: 1894-06-20 05:04
- Local date: June 20, 1894
- Local time: 14:04 JST
- Magnitude: 6.6 M
- Depth: 50 km (31 mi) to 80 km (50 mi)
- Epicenter: 35.7°N 139.8°E
- Areas affected: Japan
- Max. intensity: MMI IX (Violent)
- Tsunami: None
- Casualties: 31 dead, 157 injured

The 1894 Tokyo earthquake (明治東京地震, Meiji-Tokyo jishin) occurred in Tokyo, Japan at 14:04 PM on June 20. It affected downtown Tokyo and neighboring Kanagawa prefecture, especially the cities of Kawasaki and Yokohama.

The earthquake's epicenter was in Tokyo Bay, with a magnitude of 6.6 on the Richter scale. The depth of the 1894 earthquake has not been determined, but it is thought to have occurred within the subducting Pacific plate under the Kantō region. The death toll was 31 killed and 157 injured.

The earthquake was mentioned by author Ichiyō Higuchi in her work Mizu-no-ue no nikki, in which she described damage to buildings in Yotsuya, and soil liquefaction in the Mita area of downtown Tokyo. She also commented on an aftershock which occurred at 22:00 that night. The earthquake is also mentioned by author Jun'ichirō Tanizaki in his autobiographical work, Yōshō-jidai, in which he described how his family's house collapsed during the earthquake, a traumatic event to which he attributed his lifelong phobia of earthquakes. By 1894, Tokyo and Yokohama had numerous foreign residents, many of whom commented on the earthquake in their writings and diaries.

The National Science Museum of Japan in Tokyo has a collection of twenty-two photographs of the earthquake in the form of albumen papers, lantern slides and dry plates. A considerable number of photographs were taken just after the event for the use at the former Imperial Earthquake Investigation Committee in its official reports of the 1894 earthquake, but almost all of the original plates have been lost.

== Gallery ==
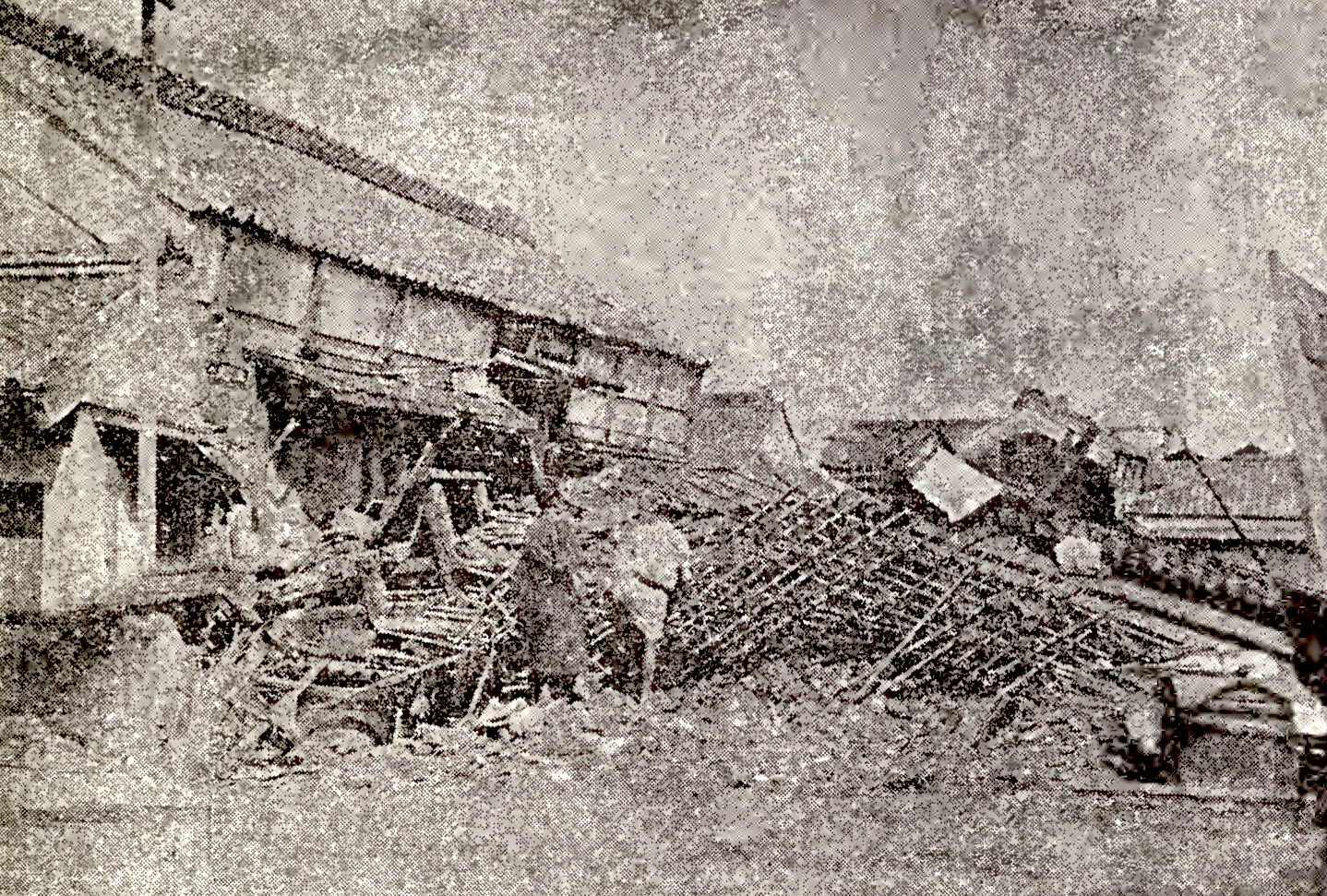
Damage in the former municipality of Kyōbashi-ku

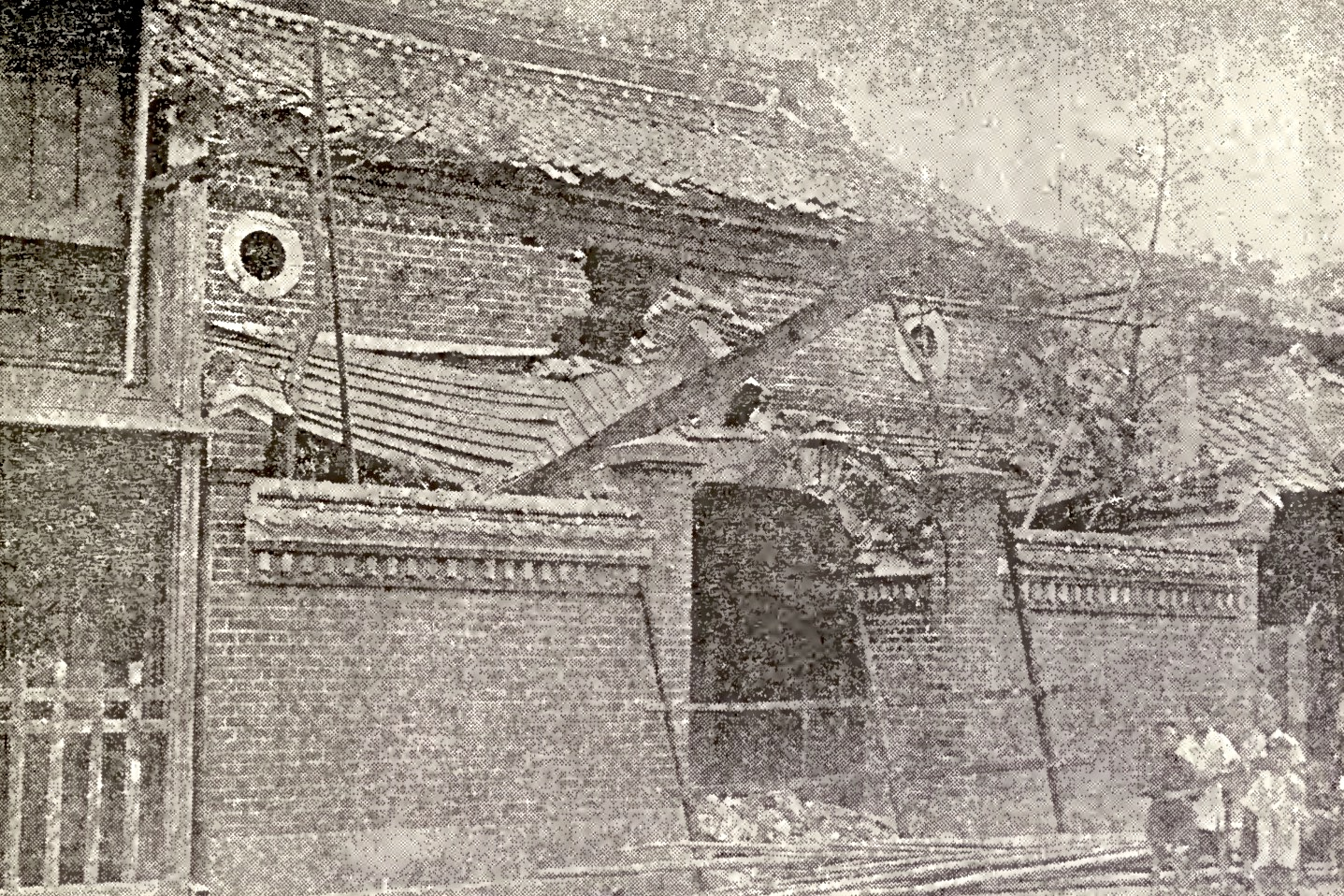
A destroyed tea-house in Tsukiji

== See also ==
- List of earthquakes in Japan
- List of historical earthquakes
