= 1855 Edo earthquake =

Earthquake in Japan

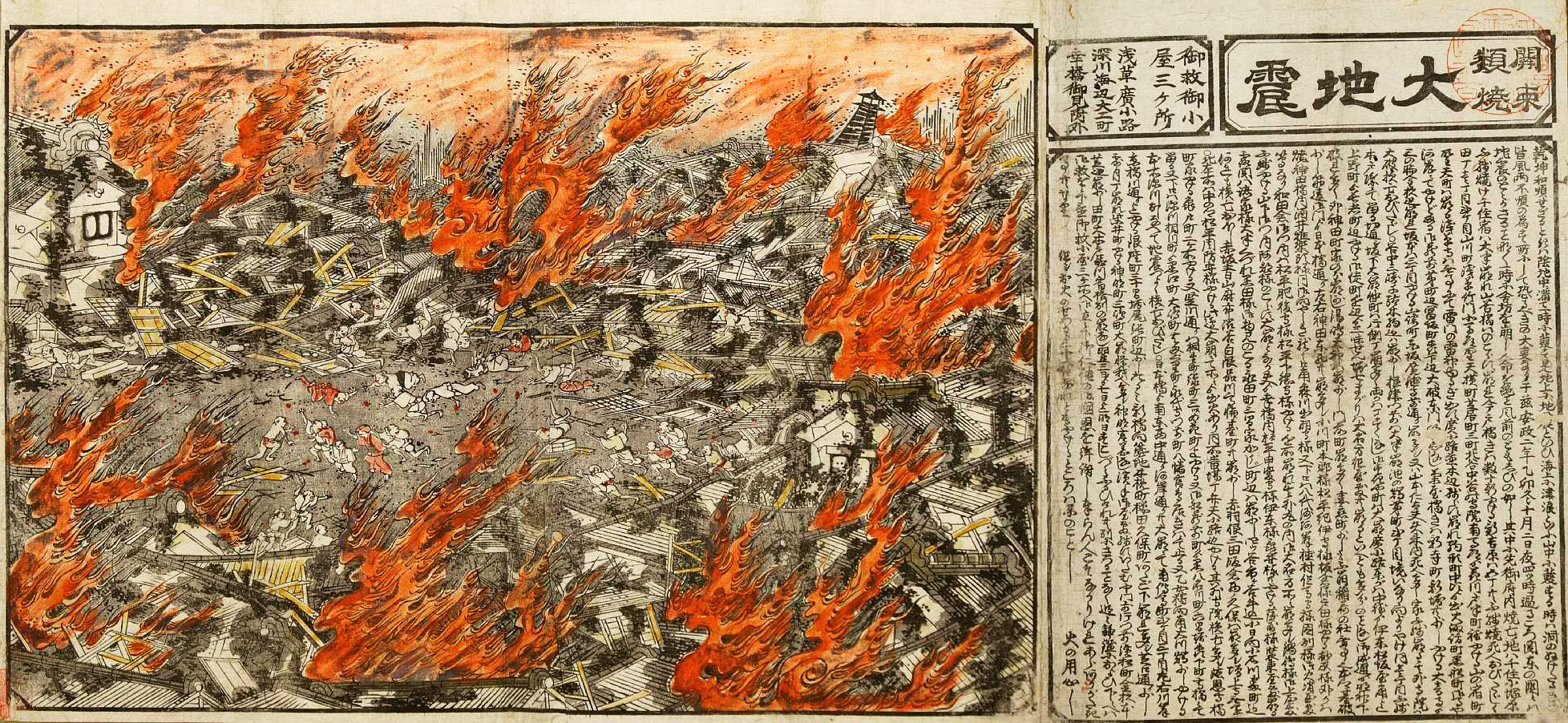
- Great Ansei Edo Earthquake, 1855.

- Location within Japan Location within Tokyo
- Local date: November 11, 1855
- Local time: 22:00
- Magnitude: 7.0 M_{s}
- Epicenter: 35.65°N 139.8°E
- Areas affected: Japan, Edo (now Tokyo)
- Max. intensity: MMI XI (Extreme)
- Tsunami: Minor
- Casualties: 7,000–10,000 dead

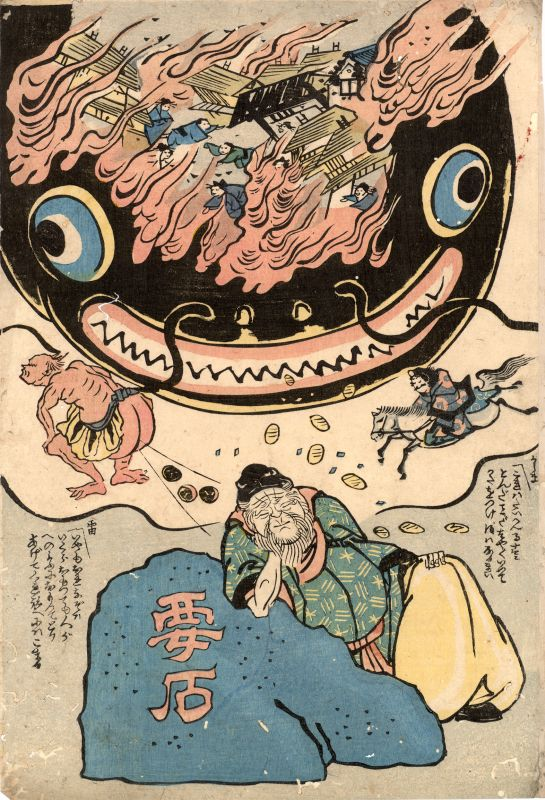
Namazu-e print showing a minor deity (Ebisu) sleeping on the job of keeping Namazu under control, allowing the destruction of Edo, Kashima returns on horseback too late

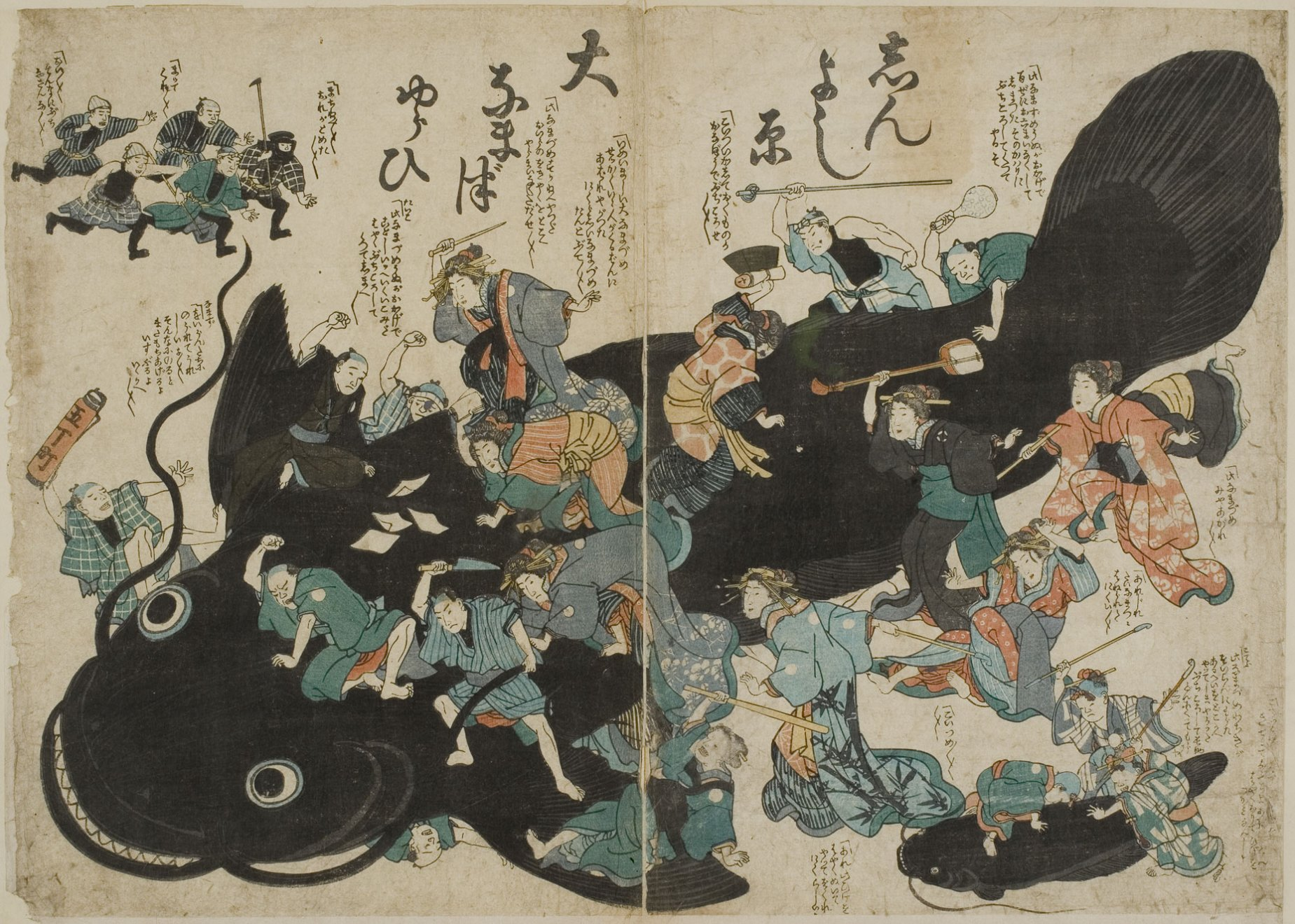
One of the Namazu-e prints that became common after the earthquake, showing the people attacking Namazu

The 1855 Edo earthquake (安政江戸地震, Ansei Edo Jishin) was the third Ansei Great Earthquake, which occurred during the late-Edo period. It occurred after the 1854 Nankai earthquake, which took place about a year prior. The earthquake occurred at 22:00 local time on 11 November. It had an epicenter close to Edo (now Tokyo), causing considerable damage in the Kantō region from the shaking and subsequent fires, with a death toll of 7,000–10,000 people and destroyed around 14,000 buildings. The earthquake had a magnitude of 7.0 on the surface wave magnitude scale and reached a maximum intensity of XI (Extreme) on the Mercalli intensity scale. The earthquake triggered a minor tsunami.

== Tectonic setting ==
The Kanto area lies above a complex part of the convergent boundaries between the subducting Pacific and Philippine Sea plates and the overriding Eurasian and North American plates. Earthquakes with epicenters in the Kantō region may occur within the Eurasian plate, at the Eurasian plate/Philippine Sea plate interface, within the Philippine Sea plate, at the Philippine Sea plate/North American plate interface (under the Sagami Trough), at the Philippine Sea plate/Pacific plate interface (Izu–Bonin–Mariana Arc), or within the Pacific plate. In addition to this set of major plates it has been suggested that there is also a separate 25 km thick, 100 km wide body, a fragment of Pacific plate lithosphere.

The cause of the 1855 earthquake is unknown; it is consistent with a rupture along the interface between the Eurasian and Philippine Sea plates, adjacent to, and down dip from, the rupture that caused the 1923 Great Kantō earthquake.

== Damage ==
A total of about 50,000 houses and over 50 temples were either destroyed by the earthquake shaking or subsequent fires. An area of about 2.3 km^{2} was burned down in Edo (now Tokyo). The earthquake's destruction and associated death toll were especially great for the time, as Ansei Edo was composed largely of plaster-and-tile structures that were resistant to fires but prone to tremors. In spite of Japan's long history with earthquakes, as of 1855 Edo had not experienced a major quake for about 154 years; in the minds of the citizenry, earthquakes were either a thing of the past or simply too unlikely to reasonably plan for. This lack of structural preparation, combined with the fact that most of the well-populated areas of Edo were built on former wetlands artificially filled in with unstable alluvial soil, left the city undefended from the massive force of the Ansei quake.

Koishikawa Mito Domain's upper residence collapsed, and Mito Domain Karo Toda Chudayu, Fujita Toko, who was said to be Mito's Ryota, was a confidant of Tokugawa Nariaki, the lord of Mito Domain, died. Nariaki's son-in-law, Nanbu Toshigo, the lord of the Morioka Domain, was also injured. After losing its leader, internal strife intensified, leading to the Sakurada Gate Incident Ansei (1860).

Edo Castle and the residences of the shogunate were severely damaged, and Shogun Tokugawa Iesada was temporarily took refuge in Fukiage Garden. In addition to loans for reconstruction funds and expenses for restoration projects to the domains affected by the Ansei Tokai and Nankai earthquakes of the previous year, the Edo Shogunate was forced to spend a large amount of money on support for the hatamoto and gokenjin and disaster victims of the earthquake and for the reconstruction of Edo City, aggravating the financial deterioration at the end of the Tokugawa shogunate.

== Characteristics ==
The earthquake was followed by 78 aftershocks in the first month.

== Aftermath ==
Two days after the earthquake, prints began to appear, with more than 400 different types being available in the following weeks. Most of the prints depicted giant catfish, a type of image known as Namazu-e. The significance being that earthquakes at the time were popularly attributed to the thrashing about of a mythological catfish under the earth, normally kept under control by the deity Kashima using a large rock. The number of prints produced during the 1855 earthquake was unprecedented and has been related to the political and social effects of the disaster. The prints show the people's anger with Kashima who became replaced by the solar deity Amaterasu. Some of the prints also depict the redistribution of wealth. The earthquake has been described as an act of yonaoshi or 'world rectification', in the light of the two great earthquakes of 1854 and the arrival of Perry's Black Ships in 1853.

=== Era of disaster ===
Three large earthquakes, the 1854 Ansei-Tōkai earthquake, 1854 Ansei-Nankai earthquake, and the 1855 Ansei Edo earthquake are collectively called the Ansei great earthquakes (安政の大地震, Ansei no Dai Jishin). Combining the effects of these disasters with a major cholera outbreak killing over 100,000 people, a fire at Edo Castle, and the 1858 Hietsu earthquake, the Ansei era was one of quite catastrophic upheaval. Due to the cumulative effects of these disasters, the reign name was changed in 1860 to usher in a 'clean slate' and better "fortune".

== See also ==
- List of earthquakes in Japan
- List of historical earthquakes
- List of tsunamis
