= 1703 Genroku earthquake =

Earthquake near Edo in the Kantō region, Japan

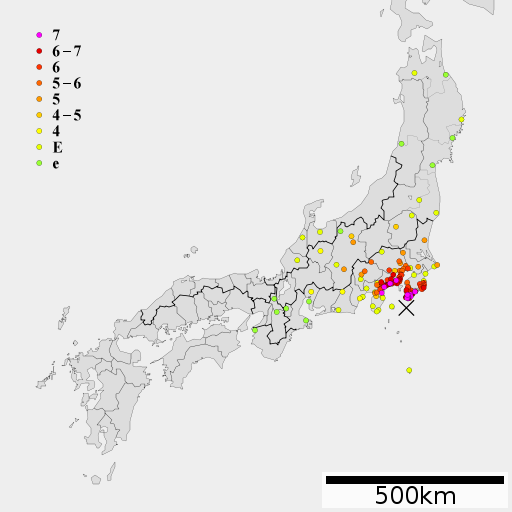

- Location within Japan
- Local date: December 31, 1703
- Local time: 02:00
- Magnitude: 8.2 M_{s}
- Epicenter: 34.7°N 139.8°E
- Areas affected: Tokyo, Japan
- Tsunami: yes
- Casualties: 5,233–200,000

The 1703 Genroku earthquake (元禄大地震, Genroku Daijishin) occurred at 02:00 local time on December 31 (17:00 December 30 UTC). The epicenter was near Edo, the forerunner of present-day Tokyo, in the southern part of the Kantō region, Japan. An estimated 2,300 people were killed by the destruction and subsequent fires. The earthquake triggered a major tsunami which caused many additional casualties, giving a total death toll of at least 5,233, possibly up to 200,000. Genroku is a Japanese era spanning from 1688 through 1704.

== Tectonic setting ==
The Kantō Region lies at the complex triple junction, where the convergent boundaries between the subducting Pacific and Philippine Sea plates and the overriding North American and Eurasian plates meet. Earthquakes with epicenters in the Kanto region may occur within the Eurasian plate, at the Eurasian plate/Philippine Sea plate interface, within the Philippine Sea plate, at the Philippine Sea plate/Pacific plate interface or within the Pacific plate. In addition to this set of major plates, it has been suggested that there is also a separate 25 kilometres (16 mi) thick, 100 kilometres (62 mi) wide body, a fragment of Pacific plate lithosphere. The 1703 earthquake is thought to have involved rupture of the interface between the Eurasian plate and the Philippine Sea plate.

== Earthquake ==
The earthquake was associated with areas of both uplift and subsidence. On both the Bōsō Peninsula and Miura Peninsula a clear paleo shoreline has been identified, indicating up to 5 metres (16 ft) of uplift near Mera (about 8 kilometres (5.0 mi) south of Tateyama) and up to 1.2 metres (3 ft 11 in) of uplift on Miura, increasing to the south. This distribution of uplift, coupled with modelling of the tsunami, indicate that at least two and probably three fault segments ruptured during the earthquake.

== Tsunami ==
The tsunami had run-up heights of 5 metres (16 ft) or more over a wide area, with a maximum of 10.5 metres (34 ft) at Wada and 10 metres (33 ft) at both Izu Ōshima and Ainohama.

== Damage ==
The area of greatest damage due to the earthquake shaking was in Kanagawa Prefecture, although Shizuoka Prefecture was also affected. The earthquake caused many large fires, particularly at Odawara, increasing both the degree of damage and the number of deaths. A total of 8,007 houses were destroyed by the shaking and a further 563 houses by the fires, causing 2,291 deaths. About 400 kilometres (250 mi) of coastline was severely affected by the tsunami, with deaths being caused from Shimoda on the east coast of the Izu Peninsula in the west to Isumi on the east side of the Bōsō Peninsula to the east. There was also a single death on the island of Hachijō-jima about 180 kilometres (110 mi) south of the earthquake's epicentre, where the tsunami was 3 metres (9.8 ft) high. The total number of casualties from earthquake, fires and tsunami has been reported as 5,233. Other estimates cite much higher figures, with 10,000 in total, and one source that gives 200,000.

== See also ==
- List of earthquakes in Japan
- List of historical earthquakes
