= List of deadly earthquakes since 1900 =

The following list compiles known earthquakes that have caused one or more fatalities since 1900. The list incorporates high-quality earthquake source (i.e., origin time, location and earthquake magnitude) and fatality information from several sources.

Earthquake locations are taken from the Centennial Catalog and the updated Engdahl, van der Hilst and Buland earthquake catalog, which is complete to December 2005. From January 2006, earthquake locations are from the United States Geological Survey's Preliminary Determination of Epicenters (PDE) monthly listing. Preferred magnitudes are moment magnitudes taken from the Global Centroid Moment Tensor Database and its predecessor, the Harvard Centroid Moment Tensor Database. Where these magnitude estimates are unavailable, the preferred magnitude estimate is taken from the Centennial Catalog and the PDE.

Five columns of fatality estimates are provided. The first two columns are derived from the PDE monthly catalog and indicate deaths resulting from earthquake shaking only (i.e., from partial or total building collapse), and total fatalities resulting from earthquake shaking and secondary effects, such as tsunami, landslide, fire, liquefaction or other factors (e.g., heart failure). Where these secondary effects are reported, they are indicated by "T", "L", "F" or "Lq", respectively. Fatality estimates in the PDE are generally obtained from official sources (e.g., local or national government officials, humanitarian agencies, emergency management agencies, etc.) or media reports within days to weeks after the earthquake. The PDE catalog is not updated if more detailed information becomes available after its final publication, usually four months after the earthquake.

The third fatality column is taken from the Utsu catalog of deadly earthquakes, and generally represents the total deaths resulting from an earthquake. The Utsu catalog is complete up until late 2003. The fourth column is derived from the Emergency Events Database (EM-DAT). EM-DAT has been developed and maintained by the Centre for Research on the Epidemiology of Disasters at the Brussels campus of the University of Louvain, Belgium and is a global, multi-hazard (e.g., earthquake, cyclone, drought, flood, volcano, extreme temperatures, etc.) database of human impacts and economic losses. Earthquake source parameters in the EM-DAT are often absent, incomplete, or erroneous. Consequently, several events may be missed in the automated catalog associations. Furthermore, where the impact of an earthquake spans political boundaries, database entries are often subdivided by country. For significant events, the observed fatalities are aggregated and manually associated.

The final fatality column is for other sources of shaking deaths and indicates improved fatality estimates from official reports and detailed scholarly studies, where available.

The death tolls presented below vary widely in quality and in many cases are estimates only, particularly for the most catastrophic events that result in high fatalities. Note that in some cases, fatalities have been documented, but no numerical value of deaths is given. In these cases, fatality estimates are left blank. Many of the events listed with no numerical value are aftershocks where additional fatalities are aggregated with the main shock.

Origin (UTC)	Present-day country/territory and link to Wikipedia article	Lat	Long	Depth (km)	Magnitude	Secondary effects	PDE shaking deaths	PDE total deaths	Utsu total deaths	EM-DAT total deaths	Other source deaths
1900-05-11 17:23	Japan	38.700	141.100	5	7.0 M_{JMA}						
1900-07-12 06:25	Turkey	40.300	43.100		5.9 M_{uk}				140		
1900-10-29 09:11	Venezuela (see 1900 San Narciso earthquake)	11.000	-66.000	0	7.7 M_{w}						
1901-02-15 00:00	China	26.000	100.100	0	6.5 M_{s}						
1901-03-31 07:11	Bulgaria	43.400	28.700		6.4 M_{uk}				4		
1901-08-09 09:23	Japan	40.500	142.500	35	7.2 M_{w}	T					
1901-11-15 20:15	New Zealand (see 1901 Cheviot earthquake)	-43.000	173.000	0	6.8 M_{s}				1		
1902-01-30 14:01	Japan	40.500	141.300	35	6.9 M_{s}				1		
1902-02-13 09:39	Azerbaijan	40.700	48.600	15	6.9 M_{uk}				86		
1902-03-09 07:46	Turkey	40.700	33.600		5.5 M_{uk}				4		
1902-04-19 02:23	Guatemala (see 1902 Guatemala earthquake)	14.000	-91.000	0	7.5 M_{w}				2000	2000	
1902-07-03 15:36	China	43.200	129.600	20	6.7 M_{s}						
1902-08-22 03:00	China (see 1902 Turkestan earthquake)	40.000	77.000	0	7.7 M_{w}				5650		
1902-09-19	Australia	-35.000	138.000	2	6.0 M_{L}				2		
1902-12-16 05:07	Uzbekistan (see 1902 Andijan earthquake)	40.800	72.300	9	6.4 M_{uk}				4725		
1903-03-29 22:30	Palestine	32.200	35.300		5.7 M_{uk}				20		
1903-04-28	Turkey (see 1903 Manzikert earthquake)	39.14	42.65		7.0 M_{s}						3500
1903-05-28 03:58	Turkey	40.900	42.700		5.8 M_{uk}				1000		
1903-08-11 04:32	Greece	36.360	22.970	80	8.3 M_{uk}				2		
1903-09-25 01:20	Iran	35.200	58.200		6.5 M_{uk}				200		
1904-04-24 06:39	Taiwan	23.500	120.500		6.0 M_{uk}				3		
1904-08-11 05:56	Greece	37.750	27.000	10	6.2 M_{uk}				4		
1904-08-30 11:42	China	30.000	101.000	0	6.8 M_{s}				565		
1904-11-05 20:25	Taiwan (see 1904 Douliu earthquake)	23.500	120.300		6.3 M_{uk}				145		
1905-04-04 00:50	India (see 1905 Kangra earthquake)	33.000	76.000	0	7.8 M_{w}				20000	20000	
1905-06-01 04:42	Albania	42.100	19.600	20	6.6 M_{uk}				120		
1905-06-02 05:39	Japan	34.100	132.500	55	7.0 mb				11		
1905-09-08 01:43	Italy (see 1905 Calabria earthquake)	39.000	16.000	0	6.8 M_{s}	T			557	2500	
1905-11-08 22:06	Greece	40.000	24.000	0	6.8 M_{s}						
1906-01-31 15:36	Ecuador (see 1906 Ecuador–Colombia earthquake)	1.000	-81.500	0	8.8 M_{uk}	T			1000	400	
1906-03-16 22:42	Taiwan (see 1906 Meishan earthquake)	23.600	120.400	5	6.8 M_{s}				1258		
1906-04-13 19:18	Taiwan	23.600	120.400	5	7.1 M_{JMA}				15		
1906-04-18 13:12	United States (see 1906 San Francisco earthquake)	38.000	-123.000	0	7.8 M_{uk}	F			700	2000	
1906-08-17 00:40	Chile (see 1906 Valparaíso earthquake)	-33.000	-72.000	0	8.2 M_{uk}	T			3760	20000	
1906-12-22 18:21	China (see 1906 Manasi earthquake)	43.500	85.000	0	7.2 M_{w}				285		
1907-01-04 05:19	Indonesia (see 1907 Sumatra earthquake)	2.000	94.500	50	7.5 M_{w}	T			400		
1907-01-14 21:36	Jamaica (see 1907 Kingston earthquake)	18.200	-76.700		6.5 M_{uk}	T			1000		
1907-04-15 06:08	Mexico	17.000	-100.000	0	7.9 M_{w}	T			28		
1907-04-18 20:59	Philippines	14.000	123.000	0	7.1 M_{w}				2		
1907-10-21 04:23	Tajikistan (see 1907 Qaratog earthquake)	38.000	69.000	0	7.2 M_{w}				15000	12000	
1908-01-11 03:35	Taiwan	23.000	121.100	5	6.8 M_{s}				2		
1908-12-28 04:20	Italy (see 1908 Messina earthquake)	38.000	15.500	0	7.2 M_{s}	T			82000	75000	
1909-01-19 04:56	Turkey	38.600	26.900		5.8 M_{uk}				8		
1909-01-23	Iran (see 1909 Borujerd earthquake)	33	50		7.3 M_{uk}						8000+
1909-02-09 11:24	Turkey	40.000	38.000	60	6.8 M_{uk}						
1909-04-14 19:53	Taiwan	25.000	122.500	5	7.1 mb				9		
1909-04-23 17:39	Portugal (see 1909 Benavente earthquake)	38.900	-8.800		6.6 M_{uk}				30		
1909-05-11 15:54	China	24.400	103.000		6.5 M_{uk}				19		
1909-06-03 18:40	Indonesia	-2.000	101.000	0	7.2 M_{w}	T			200		
1909-06-11	France (see 1909 Provence earthquake)	43.7	5.4		6.2 M_{s}						46
1909-08-14 06:31	Japan	35.400	136.300	5	6.7 M_{s}				41		
1909-10-20 23:41	Pakistan	30.000	68.000	0	7.0 M_{s}				231		
1909-11-10 06:13	Japan	32.300	131.100	150	7.5 mb				2		
1910-01-08 14:49	China	35.000	122.000	0	6.8 M_{uk}				1		
1910-02-18 05:09	Greece	36.000	24.500	150	6.9 mb				6		
1910-04-12 00:22	Japan	25.000	123.000	200	7.6 mb				20		
1910-06-24 13:27	Algeria	36.100	3.400	33	6.4 M_{uk}				81		
1911-01-03 23:25	Kazakhstan (see 1911 Kebin earthquake)	43.500	77.500	0	7.8 M_{w}				450		
1911-02-18 18:41	Kyrgyzstan (see 1911 Sarez earthquake)	40.000	73.000	0	7.2 M_{w}	L			90		
1911-04-18 18:14	Iran	32.000	56.000	50	6.7 M_{uk}				700		
1911-06-07 11:02	Mexico	17.500	-102.500	0	7.6 M_{w}				1300		
1911-06-15 14:26	Japan	28.000	130.000	90	8.1 mb	T			12		
1912-01-24 16:23	Greece	38.000	20.500	60	6.8 M_{uk}						
1912-05-06 19:00	Iceland	64.000	-20.000	0	7.0 M_{s}				1		
1912-05-23 02:24	Myanmar (see 1912 Maymyo earthquake)	21.000	97.000	0	7.7 M_{w}						
1912-08-09 01:29	Turkey (see 1912 Mürefte earthquake)	40.500	27.000	0	7.6 M_{w}				2836	923	
1912-11-19 13:55	Mexico	19.830	-99.920	15	6.7 M_{s}						164
1913-03-14 08:45	Indonesia	4.500	126.500	0	7.9 M_{w}	T					
1913-06-14 09:33	Bulgaria	43.500	25.500	0	6.8 M_{uk}				500		
1913-08-06 22:14	Peru	-17.000	-74.000	0	7.8 M_{w}	T					
1913-11-04 21:33	Peru	-14.200	-72.900	10	6.3 M_{uk}				150		
1913-12-21 15:37	China	24.500	102.000	0	7.2 M_{w}				1314		
1914-01-12 09:28	Japan	31.600	130.600	5	6.7 M_{s}	T			35		
1914-03-14 20:00	Japan	39.500	140.400	5	7.0 M_{s}				94		
1914-05-08 18:01	Italy	37.700	15.200		4.9 M_{uk}				69		
1914-05-26 14:22	Indonesia	-2.000	137.000	0	7.9 M_{w}	T					
1914-06-25 19:07	Indonesia	-4.500	102.500	0	7.6 M_{w}					20	
1914-08-04 22:41	China	43.500	91.500	0	7.2 M_{w}						
1914-10-03 22:06	Turkey (see 1914 Burdur earthquake)	37.500	32.500	0	7.1 M_{w}				4000		
1915-01-13 06:52	Italy (see 1915 Avezzano earthquake)	42.000	13.500	0	6.9 M_{s}				32610	29980	
1915-03-17 18:45	Japan	42.100	143.600	35	7.2 mb				2		
1915-06-23 04:56	United States	32.800	-115.500		6.2 M_{uk}				6		
1915-09-07 01:20	El Salvador	14.000	-89.000	80	7.4 mb				7		
1915-12-03 02:39	China	29.500	91.500	0	7.0 M_{s}				170		
1916-08-28 07:27	Taiwan (see 1916–1917 Nantou earthquakes)	23.900	120.500	5	7.2 M_{JMA}				16		
1916-11-14 22:31	Taiwan (see 1916–1917 Nantou earthquakes)	24.000	121.000		6.0 M_{uk}				1		
1917-01-04 16:55	Taiwan (see 1916–1917 Nantou earthquakes	21.900	120.900	0	6.5 M_{s}				54		
1917-01-21 23:11	Indonesia (see 1917 Bali earthquake)	-7.000	116.000		6.6 M_{uk}	T			15000		
1917-01-24 00:48	China	31.000	114.000	0	6.5 M_{s}						
1917-01-31 03:39	Philippines	6.000	125.000		6.4 M_{uk}				7		
1917-07-30 23:54	China	29.000	104.000	0	7.3 M_{w}				1879	1800	
1917-08-31 11:36	Colombia	4.000	-74.000	0	7.1 M_{s}						
1918-02-13 06:07	China (see 1918 Shantou earthquake)	23.540	117.243	15	7.2 M_{w}					10000	
1918-04-21 22:32	United States (see 1918 San Jacinto earthquake)	33.812	-117.440	15	6.8 M_{uk}				1		
1918-08-15 12:18	Philippines	5.653	123.563	35	8.2 M_{w}					100	
1918-09-07 17:15	Russia	46.812	150.253	242.4	7.6 mb	T			24		
1918-10-11 14:14	Puerto Rico (see 1918 San Fermín earthquake)	18.473	-67.631	35	7.3 M_{w}	T			116	116	
1919-05-06 19:40	Papua New Guinea	-5.477	152.629	232.8	7.6 mb	T					
1920-06-05 04:21	Taiwan	23.813	122.080	35	7.9 M_{w}				5		
1920-01-04 04:22	Mexico (see 1920 Xalapa earthquake)	19.270	-97.080	15	6.2 M_{s}	L					1500
1920-02-20 11:45	Georgia (see 1920 Gori earthquake)	42.000	44.100	11	6.2 M_{uk}				130		
1920-09-07 05:55	Italy	44.300	10.300	10	5.8 M_{uk}				171		
1920-12-16 12:05	China (see 1920 Haiyuan earthquake)	36.601	105.317	25	8.6 M_{s}				273407	180000	
1920-12-17 18:59	Argentina (see 1920 Mendoza earthquake)	-32.700	-68.400	10	6.0 M_{uk}				400		
1921-08-14	Eritrea (see 1921 Massawa earthquake)	15.61	39.445		6.1						
1921-11-11 18:36	Philippines	7.897	127.257	35	7.3 M_{w}				600		
1922-04-26 01:11	Japan	35.200	139.800	35	6.8 M_{JMA}				2		
1922-09-01 19:16	Taiwan	24.506	122.040	35	7.5 M_{w}				5		
1922-10-14 23:45	Taiwan	24.500	122.000	35	6.9 M_{JMA}				6		
1922-11-11 04:32	Chile (see 1922 Vallenar earthquake)	-28.553	-70.755	35	8.7 M_{w}	T			1000	1000	
1922-12-07 16:50	Japan	32.700	130.100	5	6.9 M_{JMA}				26		
1922-12-08 02:02	Japan	32.700	130.100	5	6.5 M_{JMA}						
1923-02-03 16:01	Russia	53.853	160.761	35	8.5 M_{w}	T					
1923-03-24 12:40	China	30.553	101.258	25	7.2 M_{w}				450	5000	
1923-04-13 15:31	Russia (see April 1923 Kamchatka earthquake and tsunami)	55.415	162.585	35	7.1 M_{w}	T			18		
1923-05-25 22:21	Iran	35.200	59.200		5.7 M_{uk}				2219		
1923-09-01 02:58	Japan (see 1923 Great Kantō earthquake)	35.405	139.084	35	7.9 M_{uk}	T,F			142807	143000	105000
1923-09-09 22:03	Bangladesh	24.943	90.320	35	7.1 M_{s}				50		
1923-09-17 07:09	Iran	37.200	57.700		6.4 M_{uk}				157		
1923-09-22 20:47	Iran	29.120	56.928	35	6.9 M_{uk}				290		
1923-12-14 10:31	Colombia	1.000	-77.500		5.3 M_{uk}				300		
1924-01-14 20:50	Japan	35.500	139.200	5	7.3 M_{JMA}				19		
1924-03-03 08:01	Ecuador	-1.600	-78.600		6.9 M_{uk}				40		
1924-04-14 16:20	Philippines (Mindanao)	7.023	125.954	33	8.3						
1924-07-03 04:40	China	36.632	83.903	35	7.1 M_{w}				255		
1924-07-12 15:12	Kyrgyzstan	40.565	73.397	25	6.8 M_{uk}				41		
1924-09-13 14:34	Turkey (see 1924 Pasinler earthquake)	39.864	41.876	35	6.8 M_{uk}				30		
1925-03-16 14:42	China (see 1925 Dali earthquake)	25.688	100.494	25	7.0 M_{s}				5808	5000	
1925-05-23 02:09	Japan	35.600	134.800	5	6.8 M_{uk}	F			428		
1925-06-29 14:42	United States (see 1925 Santa Barbara earthquake)	34.500	-119.600		6.2 M_{uk}				13		
1925-12-14 00:00	Iran	34.600	58.100		5.5 M_{uk}				500		
1925-12-18 05:53	Iran	28.500	51.200		5.5 M_{uk}				2		
1926-03-18 14:06	Turkey	35.787	29.246	35	6.9 M_{uk}						
1926-06-26 19:46	Greece	36.605	26.888	101.8	7.7 mb				110		
1926-06-28 03:23	Indonesia	-0.051	101.522	35	6.8 M_{uk}				222		
1926-10-22 19:59	Turkey (see 1926 Kars earthquake)	40.700	43.700	7	5.7 M_{uk}				370		
1926-11-05 07:55	Nicaragua	12.670	-86.736	35	7.1 mb						
1927-03-07 09:27	Japan (see 1927 North Tango earthquake)	35.802	134.924	9.6	7.6 M_{s}	T,F			2925	2925	
1927-03-20 00:00	China	24.100	102.000		5.0 M_{uk}				7		
1927-04-14 06:23	Argentina	-32.477	-69.675	35	7.2 mb				8		
1927-05-22 22:32	China (see 1927 Gulang earthquake)	37.386	102.311	25	7.9 M_{s}				40912	200000	
1927-07-11 13:04	Palestine, Jordan (see 1927 Jericho earthquake)	32.000	35.500	33	6.3 M_{uk}				361		
1927-08-24 18:09	Taiwan	23.118	120.237	35	6.8 M_{uk}				11		
1928-03-22 04:17	Mexico	16.127	-96.505	35	7.5 M_{w}	T					
1928-03-31 00:29	Turkey	38.100	27.100		6.5 M_{uk}				170		
1928-04-09 17:34	Peru	-13.731	-70.628	35	6.8 M_{s}				10		
1928-04-14 09:00	Bulgaria (see 1928 Chirpan–Plovdiv earthquakes)	42.402	25.667	15	6.8 M_{uk}				107	107	
1928-04-18 19:22	Bulgaria	42.386	25.087	15	6.8 M_{uk}				103		
1928-05-14 22:14	Peru	-5.261	-78.559	35	7.2 M_{w}				29		
1928-08-21 19:01	Iran	37.300	57.900	9	5.4 M_{uk}				10		
1928-12-01 04:06	Chile	-35.086	-71.683	35	7.7 M_{w}	T			225		
1928-12-19 11:37	Philippines	6.977	124.856	35	7.3 M_{w}	T			93		
1929-01-17 11:45	Venezuela	9.499	-64.381	35	6.9 M_{uk}	T					
1929-05-01 15:37	Turkmenistan (see 1929 Kopet Dag earthquake)	37.957	57.693	25	7.1 M_{w}				3257	3300	
1929-05-18 06:37	Turkey	40.200	37.900	10	6.5 M_{uk}				64		
1929-05-30 09:43	Argentina	-34.768	-67.598	35	6.8 M_{uk}				52		
1929-06-16 22:47	New Zealand (see 1929 Murchison earthquake)	-41.831	172.292	35	7.5 M_{w}	T			17		
1929-07-13 07:36	Iran	37.500	58.000	57	5.8 M_{uk}				5		
1929-10-19 10:12	Chile	-23.038	-68.737	35	7.4 mb						
1929-11-18 20:32	Saint Pierre and Miquelon (see 1929 Grand Banks earthquake)	44.539	-56.008	15	7.3 M_{uk}	T			52		
1930-05-05 13:45	Myanmar (see 1930 Bago earthquake)	17.665	96.543	35	7.2 M_{w}	T,F			550	500	
1930-05-06 22:34	Iran (see 1930 Salmas earthquake)	38.152	44.685	25	7.1 M_{w}				2514	2500	
1930-05-14 19:48	China	26.800	103.000		6.0 M_{uk}				42		
1930-07-23 00:08	Italy (see 1930 Irpinia earthquake)	41.05	15.367		6.6 M_{uk}						1404
1930-10-30 07:13	Italy	43.750	13.500		6.0 M_{uk}				18		
1930-11-21 02:00	Albania	40.500	19.500	12	6.0 M_{uk}				35		
1930-11-25 19:02	Japan	34.977	139.103	35	6.9 M_{w}				272	0	
1930-12-02 13:29	Albania	40.300	19.600	4	5.0 M_{uk}				25		
1930-12-03 18:51	Myanmar (see 1930 Pyu earthquake)	17.972	96.422	35	7.3 M_{w}				22	36	
1930-12-08 08:01	Taiwan	23.200	120.600		6.3 M_{uk}				4		
1930-12-24 06:02	Argentina	-24.700	-66.300	30	6.0 M_{uk}				36		
1930-12-25 19:03	Japan	35.100	133.000	5	7.0 M_{uk}				272		
1931-01-15 01:50	Mexico	16.053	-96.614	35	7.8 M_{w}				68		
1931-02-02 22:46	New Zealand (see 1931 Hawke's Bay earthquake)	-39.772	176.025	35	7.7 M_{w}	T			256	256	
1931-02-10 06:34	Indonesia	-5.433	102.458	35	7.1 M_{w}				18		
1931-03-08 01:50	Kingdom of Yugoslavia	41.337	22.666	25	6.8 M_{uk}				35		
1931-03-31 16:02	Nicaragua (see 1931 Nicaragua earthquake)	13.200	-85.700		5.6 M_{uk}	F			1000		
1931-04-27 16:50	Armenia	39.200	46.000	22	6.3 M_{uk}				390		
1931-06-07 01:30	England (see 1931 Dogger Bank earthquake)	54.08	1.5		6.1 M_{uk}						1
1931-08-10 21:18	China (see 1931 Fuyun earthquake)	46.571	89.965	35	7.9 M_{w}				10000		
1931-08-27 15:27	Pakistan	29.473	67.172	35	7.1 M_{w}				200		
1931-09-21 02:20	Japan	36.021	139.381	35	6.8 M_{uk}				16		
1931-10-03 19:13	Solomon Islands	-10.932	161.016	35	7.8 M_{w}	T			50		
1931-11-02 10:03	Japan	32.003	131.945	42.2	7.5 M_{w}	T			1		
1932-02-03 06:16	Cuba	19.770	-75.850	25	6.8 M_{uk}				8		
1932-03-14 22:42	Venezuela	8.149	-71.974	35	6.8 M_{uk}				6		
1932-04-06 09:11	China	31.400	115.000	15	6.0 M_{uk}				6		
1932-05-14 13:11	Indonesia	0.258	126.169	35	8.1 M_{w}				5	6	
1932-05-21 10:10	Nicaragua	12.364	-87.894	35	6.9 M_{uk}				10		
1932-06-03 10:36	Mexico (1932 Jalisco earthquakes)	19.457	-104.146	25	7.9 M_{w}	T			60		
1932-06-18 10:12	Mexico	19.452	-103.632	54.3	7.9 M_{w}	T			52		
1932-06-22 12:59	Mexico	19.028	-104.379	25	6.9 M_{uk}	T			75		
1932-09-26 19:20	Greece (see 1932 Ierissos earthquake)	40.333	23.732	35	6.9 M_{uk}	T			491		
1932-12-25 02:04	China (see 1932 Changma earthquake)	39.771	96.690	25	7.6 M_{w}				275		
1933-03-02 17:31	Japan (see 1933 Sanriku earthquake)	39.224	144.622	35	8.4 M_{uk}	T			3064	3008	
1933-03-11 01:55	United States (see 1933 Long Beach earthquake)	33.63	-118		6.4 M_{w}						120
1933-04-23 05:57	Greece	36.516	27.150	35	6.8 M_{uk}				74		
1933-06-24 21:54	Indonesia	-5.522	104.434	35	7.3 M_{w}				76		
1933-08-25 07:50	China (see 1933 Diexi earthquake)	31.810	103.541	25	7.3 M_{w}				6865		
1933-11-28 11:09	Iran	32.100	56.000	27	6.3 M_{uk}				4		
1934-01-12 13:31	China	23.700	102.700		6.0 M_{uk}				1		
1934-01-15 08:43	Nepal (see 1934 Nepal–India earthquake)	26.773	86.762	35	8.1 M_{uk}				10700	6000	
1935-01-04 14:41	Turkey (see 1935 Erdek–Marmara Islands earthquake)	40.500	27.500	7	6.2 M_{uk}				5		
1935-02-25 02:51	Greece	36.084	24.703	35	6.8 M_{uk}						
1935-03-05 10:27	Iran	36.300	53.300		6.0 M_{uk}				60		
1935-04-11 23:14	Iran	36.432	53.621	35	6.8 M_{uk}				500		
1935-04-20 22:02	Taiwan (see 1935 Shinchiku-Taichū earthquake)	24.364	120.613	35	7.1 M_{s}				3276	3410	
1935-04-28 00:00	China	29.400	102.300		6.0 M_{uk}				2		
1935-05-01	Turkey (see 1935 Digor earthquake)	40.38	43.41	7	6.2 M_{uk}						200
1935-05-30 21:32	Pakistan (see 1935 Quetta earthquake)	28.894	66.176	35	8.1 M_{w}				60000	60000	
1935-07-11 18:35	Japan	35.000	138.000	10	6.3 M_{uk}				9		
1936-01-09 09:23	Colombia	1.100	-77.600		7.0 M_{uk}				250		
1936-02-07 08:56	China	35.633	103.265	25	6.8 M_{uk}				42		
1936-04-26 23:59	China	28.733	103.497	25	6.8 M_{uk}						
1936-05-16 07:05	China	28.675	103.684	25	6.8 M_{uk}				550		
1936-08-01 06:24	China	34.200	105.700		6.0 M_{uk}				144		
1936-08-17 00:00	China	26.600	103.000		5.5 M_{uk}				30		
1936-08-23 21:12	Indonesia	5.296	94.759	35	7.1 M_{s}	T			91	9	
1937-07-26 03:47	Mexico	18.523	-95.878	35	7.2 mb				34		
1937-07-31 20:35	China	35.252	115.153	25	6.9 M_{uk}				3833		
1937-08-20 11:59	Philippines	14.318	121.547	35	7.3 M_{w}	T			1		
1937-12-23 13:18	Mexico	17.431	-98.287	35	7.4 M_{w}				4		
1938-04-19 10:59	Turkey (see 1938 Kırşehir earthquake)	39.439	34.015	35	6.8 M_{uk}				155	149	
1938-05-19 17:08	Indonesia	-0.366	119.525	49.4	7.5 M_{w}	T			8		
1938-11-05 08:43	Japan	37.009	142.045	35	7.9 M_{w}	T			1		
1939-01-25 03:32	Chile (see 1939 Chillán earthquake)	-36.200	-72.200	0	7.7 M_{w}				28000	30000	
1939-04-30 02:55	Solomon Islands	-9.295	159.234	35	7.9 M_{w}	T			12		
1939-05-01 05:58	Japan	39.839	139.969	35	7.0 M_{s}	T			27		
1939-06-22 19:19	Ghana	5.180	-0.130	13	6.4 M_{uk}				22		
1939-09-19 00:00	China	24.400	102.500		5.5 M_{uk}				1		
1939-12-26 23:57	Turkey (see 1939 Erzincan earthquake)	39.770	39.533	35	7.8 M_{s}				32968	32962	
1940-04-06 13:43	China	23.900	102.300		6.0 M_{uk}				181		
1940-05-07 22:23	Georgia	41.700	43.800	19	6.0 M_{uk}				5		
1940-05-19 04:36	United States (see 1940 El Centro earthquake)	33.222	-115.697	15	6.9 M_{uk}				9	9	
1940-05-24 16:33	Peru (see 1940 Lima earthquake)	-11.119	-77.629	50.1	7.5 M_{w}	T			250	249	
1940-06-19 00:00	China	24.400	102.500		5.5 M_{uk}				2		
1940-08-01 15:08	Japan	44.508	139.829	35	7.5 M_{w}	T			10		
1940-11-10 01:39	Romania (see 1940 Vrancea earthquake)	45.773	26.655	122	7.3 mb				1000	980	
1941-01-11 08:32	Yemen (see 1941 Jabal Razih earthquake)	16.400	43.500		5.9 M_{uk}				1200		
1941-02-16 16:38	Iran	33.500	58.600		6.3 M_{uk}				680		
1941-04-15 19:09	Mexico	18.677	-102.957	35	7.6 M_{w}				90		
1941-05-05 15:18	China	47.000	127.200		6.0 M_{uk}				132		
1941-05-16 07:14	China	23.514	99.408	25	6.9 M_{uk}				16		
1941-06-26 11:52	India	12.149	92.478	49.1	7.7 M_{w}	T					
1941-09-10 21:53	Turkey (see 1941 Van–Erciş earthquake)	39.500	43.300	28	6.0 M_{uk}				500		
1941-10-08 15:24	China	31.700	102.300		6.0 M_{uk}				139		
1941-11-12 10:04	Turkey	39.700	39.400	70	5.9 M_{uk}				15		
1941-11-18 16:46	Japan	32.000	132.000	0	7.7 M_{w}	T			2		
1941-12-16 19:19	Taiwan (see 1941 Chungpu earthquake)	23.251	120.391	35	7.1 M_{w}				357		
1941-12-26 14:48	Myanmar	21.076	99.145	25	7.0 M_{s}						
1942-02-01 17:30	China	23.100	100.300		6.8 M_{uk}				90		
1942-05-14 02:13	Ecuador (see 1942 Ecuador earthquake)	0.012	-79.902	35	7.8 M_{w}				200	200	
1942-08-06 23:37	Guatemala (see 1942 Guatemala earthquake)	13.780	-90.913	35	7.7 M_{w}				38		
1942-08-24 22:50	Peru	-14.975	-74.920	35	7.7 M_{w}	T			30		
1942-08-27 06:14	Albania	41.700	20.400	33	6.0 M_{uk}				43		
1942-12-20 14:03	Turkey (see 1942 Niksar–Erbaa earthquake)	40.671	36.450	35	7.2 M_{w}				3000	3000	
1943-01-20 15:32	Turkey	40.800	30.500		6.6 M_{uk}				285		
1943-02-22 09:20	Mexico	17.750	-101.500	0	7.4 M_{w}				11		
1943-04-06 16:07	Chile (see 1943 Ovalle earthquake)	-30.750	-72.000	0	8.2 M_{w}	T			18		
1943-06-20 15:33	Turkey (see 1943 Adapazarı–Hendek earthquake)	40.600	30.500	15	6.2 M_{uk}				336		
1943-07-23 14:53	Indonesia	-9.500	110.000	90	7.6 mb				213	213	
1943-09-10 08:36	Japan (see 1943 Tottori earthquake)	35.250	134.000	0	7.0 M_{w}	F			1083	1083	
1943-11-26 22:20	Turkey (see 1943 Tosya–Ladik earthquake)	41.000	34.000	0	7.5 M_{w}				4020	2824	
1943-12-02 05:08	Taiwan	22.900	121.500	0	6.5 M_{s}				3		
1944-01-15 23:49	Argentina (see 1944 San Juan earthquake)	-31.250	-68.750	50	7.1 M_{w}				8000	10000	
1944-02-01 03:22	Turkey (see 1944 Bolu–Gerede earthquake)	41.500	32.500	0	7.2 M_{w}				3959	3959	
1944-03-09 22:12	China	44.000	84.000	0	7.1 M_{s}				4		
1944-04-05 00:00	Iran	36.800	54.500	7	4.8 M_{uk}				20		
1944-10-06 21:34	Turkey	39.400	26.700		6.8 M_{s}				30		
1944-12-07 04:35	Japan (see 1944 Tōnankai earthquake)	33.750	136.000	0	8.1 M_{uk}	T			1251	998	
1945-01-12 18:38	Japan (see 1945 Mikawa earthquake)	34.750	136.750	0	6.8 M_{s}	T			2306	1961	
1945-02-10 04:57	Japan	41.250	142.500	50	7.1 M_{s}	T			2		
1945-03-20 07:59	Turkey	37.400	35.800	60	6.0 M_{uk}				300		
1945-09-13 11:17	Chile	-33.250	-70.500	100	7.0 mb				4		
1945-09-23 15:34	China	39.500	119.000		6.3 M_{uk}				600		
1945-11-27 21:56	Pakistan (see 1945 Balochistan earthquake)	24.500	63.000	0	8.0 M_{w}	T			300	4000	
1946-02-12 02:43	Algeria	36.000	5.000		6.0 M_{uk}				277		
1946-02-21 15:43	Turkey	38.200	31.800	60	5.6 M_{uk}				12		
1946-04-01 12:28	United States (see 1946 Aleutian Islands earthquake)	52.750	-163.500	0	7.3 M_{s}	T			173	165	
1946-05-31 03:12	Turkey (see 1946 Varto–Hınıs earthquake)	39.300	41.200		5.9 M_{uk}				1300		
1946-06-23 17:13	Canada (see 1946 Vancouver Island earthquake)	49.750	-124.500	0	7.6 M_{w}	T			1		
1946-08-02 19:18	Chile	-26.500	-70.500	50	7.1 M_{s}				2		
1946-08-04 17:51	Dominican Republic (see 1946 Dominican Republic earthquake)	19.250	-69.000	0	7.9 M_{w}	T			100	73	
1946-11-02 18:28	Kyrgyzstan (see 1946 Chatkal earthquake)	41.500	72.500	0	7.3 M_{w}						
1946-11-04 21:47	Turkmenistan	39.750	54.500	0	7.1 M_{w}				400		
1946-11-10 17:42	Peru (see 1946 Ancash earthquake)	-8.500	-77.500	0	6.8 M_{w}				1400	1400	
1946-12-04 22:46	Taiwan (see 1946 Hsinhua earthquake)	22.500	122.500	0	6.6 M_{s}				74		
1946-12-20 19:19	Japan (see 1946 Nankai earthquake)	32.500	134.500	0	8.1 M_{uk}	T,F			1330	2000	
1947-03-26 20:48	China	25.000	102.000		5.5 M_{uk}				4		
1947-09-23 12:28	Iran	33.000	59.000	0	6.8 M_{uk}				500		
1947-09-26 16:01	Japan	24.750	123.000	110	7.4 mb				5		
1947-10-06 19:55	Greece	37.000	22.000	0	6.9 M_{s}	T					
1947-11-01 14:58	Peru	-10.500	-75.000	0	7.7 M_{w}				233	233	
1948-01-24 17:46	Philippines	10.500	122.000	0	8.1 M_{w}	T			72	27	
1948-05-11 08:55	Peru	-17.500	-70.250	70	7.4 mb				4		
1948-05-25 07:11	China	29.500	100.500	0	7.2 M_{w}				737		
1948-05-28 05:36	Peru	-13.000	-76.500	60	7.0 M_{uk}				4		
1948-06-15 11:44	Japan	33.750	135.250	0	6.9 M_{uk}				2		
1948-06-27 00:08	China	26.400	99.700		6.8 M_{uk}				280		
1948-06-28 07:13	Japan (see 1948 Fukui earthquake)	36.500	136.000	0	7.0 M_{w}	F			3769	5131	
1948-06-30 12:21	Greece	38.500	20.500	33	6.4 M_{uk}				6		
1948-08-25 06:09	Argentina (see 1948 Salta earthquake)	-24.500	-65.000	50	6.9 M_{s}				5		
1948-10-05 20:12	Turkmenistan (see 1948 Ashgabat earthquake)	37.500	58.000	0	7.2 M_{w}				19800	110000	
1948-10-08 19:01	China	27.400	104.000		5.8 M_{uk}				9		
1948-12-04 00:22	Mexico	22.000	-106.500	0	6.9 M_{uk}				4		
1949-02-23 16:08	China	41.000	83.500	0	7.3 M_{w}				12		
1949-04-13 19:55	United States (see 1949 Olympia earthquake)	47.250	-122.500	60	6.5 M_{s}				8	8	
1949-04-20 03:29	Chile	-38.000	-73.500	70	7.1 mb				57		
1949-07-10 03:53	Tajik Soviet Socialist Republic (see 1949 Khait earthquake)	39.000	70.500	0	7.6 M_{w}				12000		
1949-07-23 15:03	Turkey	38.600	26.300	0	6.8 M_{uk}	T			7		
1949-08-05 19:08	Ecuador (see 1949 Ambato earthquake)	-1.500	-78.250	0	6.8 M_{uk}				6000	6000	
1949-08-17 18:44	Turkey (see 1949 Karlıova earthquake)	39.500	40.600	0	6.8 M_{uk}				320	437	
1949-12-17 06:53	Chile (see 1949 Tierra del Fuego earthquakess)	-54.000	-71.000	0	7.8 M_{w}				1		
1949-12-17 15:07	Chile	-54.000	-71.000	0	7.8 M_{w}				3		
1949-12-29 03:03	Philippines	18.000	121.000	0	7.2 M_{w}	T			15		
1950-05-21 18:37	Peru	-13.500	-72.000		6.0 M_{uk}				120		
1950-06-19 12:36	Indonesia	-6.250	112.000	0	6.8 M_{uk}				16		
1950-08-03 22:18	Venezuela	10.500	-68.000	8	6.8 M_{uk}				100		
1950-08-15 14:09	China (see 1950 Assam–Tibet earthquake)	28.500	96.500	0	8.6 M_{uk}	L			3300	1500	
1950-12-09 21:38	Chile	-23.500	-67.500	100	7.7 mb				4		
1951-07-09 00:04	Mexico	16.100	-96.800	50	6.2 M_{uk}				1		
1951-08-13 18:33	Turkey (see 1951 Kurşunlu earthquake)	40.800	33.400	0	6.7 M_{uk}				50		
1951-10-21 21:34	Taiwan (see 1951 East Rift Valley earthquakes)	23.750	121.500	0	7.5 M_{w}				68		
1951-11-24 18:50	Taiwan (see 1951 East Rift Valley earthquakes)	23.000	122.500	0	7.3 M_{w}				17		
1952-01-03 06:03	Turkey (see 1952 Hasankale earthquake)	39.900	41.700		6.0 M_{uk}				103		
1952-03-04 01:22	Japan	42.500	143.000	0	8.1 M_{w}	T			33	30	
1952-06-11 00:31	Argentina (see 1952 San Juan earthquake)	-31.581	-68.467	25	6.5 M_{s}				5		
1952-07-17 16:09	Japan	34.400	135.800	64	6.8 M_{uk}				9		
1952-07-21 11:52	United States (see 1952 Kern County earthquake)	34.949	-119.046	10	7.3 M_{uk}				12	14	
1952-08-17 16:02	China	30.797	91.648	10	7.7 M_{w}				54		
1952-08-22 22:41	United States	35.333	-118.917	16	5.8 M_{uk}				2		
1952-10-22 00:00	Turkey	36.500	35.500		5.0 M_{uk}				10		
1952-11-04 16:58	Russia (see 1952 Severo-Kurilsk earthquake)	52.755	160.057	22.2	9.0 M_{uk}	T					
1953-01-25 19:47	Haiti	18.400	-73.400		5.7 M_{uk}				2		
1953-02-12 08:15	Iran	35.400	55.100		6.4 M_{uk}				973		
1953-03-18 19:06	Turkey (see 1953 Yenice–Gönen earthquake)	40.120	27.621	15	7.2 M_{w}				1103	1200	
1953-05-06 17:16	Chile	-37.254	-72.920	68.4	7.5 mb	T			19		
1953-08-12 09:23	Greece (see 1953 Ionian earthquake)	38.046	20.766	15	7.2 M_{w}				800	455	
1953-09-10 04:06	Cyprus (see 1953 Paphos earthquake)	35.000	32.500		6.5 M_{uk}				40		
1953-09-14 00:26	Fiji (see 1953 Suva earthquake)	-18.300	178.200	33	6.8 M_{uk}	T			8		
1953-12-12 17:31	Peru	-3.597	-80.847	19	7.5 M_{w}	T			7	7	
1954-02-11 00:30	China	38.876	101.212	35	7.1 M_{w}				47		
1954-04-30 13:02	Greece	39.187	22.239	25	6.8 M_{s}				31		
1954-07-02 02:45	Philippines	13.000	123.900	0	6.8 M_{s}				22	13	
1954-08-20 15:30	Iran	27.500	52.000		5.0 M_{uk}				1		
1954-09-09 01:04	Algeria (see 1954 Chlef earthquake)	36.200	1.600	0	6.7 M_{s}				1409	1250	
1955-03-31 18:17	Philippines	7.386	122.878	54.2	7.7 M_{w}				465	400	
1955-04-14 01:29	China	29.981	101.613	10	7.5 M_{w}				94	39	
1955-04-15 03:40	China	39.816	74.640	35	7.1 M_{w}				5		
1955-04-19 20:24	Chile	-29.900	-71.600	0	6.9 M_{s}	T			1		
1955-04-21 07:18	Greece	39.500	23.000		6.0 M_{uk}				7		
1955-07-16 07:07	Turkey	37.600	27.200	0	6.8 M_{s}				23		
1955-09-12 06:09	Egypt	32.200	29.600	33	6.7 M_{s}				18	20	
1955-09-01 17:33	Costa Rica	10.000	-84.500		5.8 M_{uk}				10		
1955-09-23 15:06	China	26.600	101.700	0	6.9 M_{s}				593		
1956-01-12 05:46	Hungary	47.500	19.300		5.8 M_{uk}				2		
1956-02-20 20:31	Turkey	40.000	30.500		5.8 M_{uk}				4		
1956-03-16 19:32	Syrian Arab Republic	35.500	35.500		5.8 M_{uk}				148		
1956-06-09 23:13	Afghanistan	35.042	67.479	35	7.6 M_{w}	L			350	100	
1956-07-09 03:11	Greece (see 1956 Amorgos earthquake)	36.617	26.026	35	7.8 M_{w}	T			53		
1956-07-16 15:07	Myanmar (see 1956 Sagaing earthquake)	21.969	95.802	32.1	7.1 M_{w}				38		
1956-07-21 15:32	India	23.000	70.000		6.1 M_{uk}				111		
1956-09-29 23:20	Japan	35.642	140.310	67	6.9 M_{s}				1		
1956-10-31 14:03	Iran	27.283	54.405	35	6.8 M_{s}				410		
1957-02-20 04:41	Tunisia	36.200	8.900		5.6 M_{uk}				13		
1957-02-23 20:26	Taiwan	23.917	121.517	56.8	7.2 M_{w}				7		
1957-03-08 12:21	Greece	39.267	22.607	10	6.9 M_{s}				2		
1957-04-25 02:25	Turkey	36.387	28.609	63.4	7.0 mb				67		
1957-05-26 06:33	Turkey (see 1957 Abant earthquake)	40.672	31.042	15	7.2 M_{w}				500	53	
1957-07-02 00:42	Iran	36.090	52.701	35	7.1 M_{w}				1200	2500	
1957-07-28 08:40	Mexico	16.881	-99.297	37.2	7.8 M_{w}	T			160	160	
1957-12-04 03:37	Mongolia	45.153	99.206	35	8.1 M_{uk}						
1957-12-13 01:45	Iran	34.278	47.712	35	6.8 M_{s}				2000	3000	
1958-01-15 19:14	Peru	-16.779	-72.503	68.6	7.0 mb				28	28	
1958-01-19 14:07	Ecuador (see 1958 Ecuador–Colombia earthquake)	1.054	-79.480	35	7.8 M_{w}	T			20		
1958-02-07 23:23	China	31.577	103.912	14.2	6.8 M_{s}						
1958-03-11 00:26	Japan	24.433	124.351	109.9	7.2 mb				2		
1958-04-14 21:32	Ecuador	0.706	-79.575	35	6.8 M_{s}				3		
1958-07-10 06:15	US Territory of Alaska (see 1958 Lituya Bay earthquake and megatsunami)	58.370	-136.665	35	7.3 M_{uk}	T			5		
1958-08-16 19:13	Iran	34.259	47.869	35	6.7 M_{s}				200	191	
1958-09-04 21:51	Chile	-33.785	-70.112	35	6.8 M_{s}				7		
1958-10-20 01:12	Indonesia	-9.500	112.500	100	6.7 M_{uk}				7		
1959-04-26 20:40	Japan	24.687	122.792	126.3	7.5 mb				1		
1959-05-04 07:15	Russia	53.351	159.645	35	8.0 M_{w}	T			1		
1959-05-24 19:17	Mexico	17.450	-97.145	69.6	7.0 mb				5		
1959-06-14 00:12	Chile	-20.369	-68.881	111.6	7.5 mb				1		
1959-08-15 08:57	Taiwan (see 1959 Hengchun earthquake)	21.952	120.970	25	7.2 M_{w}				17		
1959-08-18 06:37	United States (see 1959 Hebgen Lake earthquake)	44.548	-110.636	15	7.3 M_{uk}				28	28	
1959-08-26 08:25	Mexico	18.160	-94.417	32.4	6.9 M_{s}				25		
1959-09-01 11:37	Albania	40.900	19.800	11	6.1 M_{uk}				2		
1960-01-13 15:40	Peru	-15.814	-72.788	95.4	7.5 mb				63	57	
1960-01-15 09:30	Peru	-14.961	-75.162	97.2	6.9 mb				63		
1960-02-21 08:13	Algeria	36.000	4.100	33	5.6 M_{uk}				47		
1960-02-29 23:40	Morocco (see 1960 Agadir earthquake)	30.500	-9.500		5.7 M_{w}				13100		
1960-04-24 12:14	Iran	28.000	54.500		6.0 M_{uk}				420		
1960-05-22 10:30	Chile	-37.963	-73.173	38	6.8 M_{w}	T					
1960-05-22 19:11	Chile (see 1960 Valdivia earthquake)	-38.235	-73.047	35	9.5 M_{uk}	T			5700	6000	
1960-09-22 09:05	Democratic Republic of the Congo	-3.600	29.000	28	6.6 M_{uk}				24		
1960-11-20 22:02	Peru	-6.727	-80.606	52	7.8 M_{w}	T			11		
1961-02-26 18:10	Japan	31.632	131.548	49.9	7.7 M_{w}	T			2		
1961-06-01 23:29	Ethiopia	10.440	39.858	23.9	6.6 M_{uk}				30		
1961-06-11 05:10	Iran	27.865	54.558	35	6.8 M_{s}				61		
1961-08-19 05:33	Japan	36.070	136.700	35	6.9 M_{s}				8		
1961-12-20 13:25	Colombia	4.587	-75.542	162.9	6.9 M_{s}				23		
1962-01-08 01:00	Dominican Republic	18.291	-70.461	32.6	6.7 M_{s}				1		
1962-05-11 14:11	Mexico	17.171	-99.651	35	7.3 M_{w}	T			4		
1962-05-19 14:58	Mexico	17.008	-99.764	35	6.7 M_{s}	T			30		
1962-07-30 20:19	Colombia	5.096	-76.626	150	6.9 M_{s}				47		
1962-08-28 10:59	Greece	37.874	22.737	107.7	6.8 M_{s}				1		
1962-09-01 19:20	Iran (see 1962 Buin Zahra earthquake)	35.556	49.810	17.6	6.9 M_{s}				12225	12000	
1963-02-13 08:50	Taiwan	24.356	122.060	35	7.3 M_{w}	T			15		
1963-07-16 18:27	Georgia	43.163	41.527	35	6.7 M_{s}				2		
1963-07-26 04:17	North Macedonia (see 1963 Skopje earthquake)	?	??	?	6.1 M_{w}			1100			
1963-09-24 16:30	Peru	-10.694	-78.212	65.3	6.9 mb				1		
1964-01-08 22:30	Indonesia	-3.737	119.419	60	5.5 mb				8		
1964-01-18 12:04	Taiwan (see 1964 Baihe earthquake)	23.150	120.656	21	6.4 mb				106	107	
1964-03-28 03:36	United States (see 1964 Alaska earthquake)	61.017	-147.648	6.6	9.2 M_{uk}	T			131	131	
1964-04-02 01:11	Indonesia	5.987	95.404	129.2	5.6 mb	T			110		
1964-05-07 05:45	Tanzania	-3.930	35.112	31.6	6.3 mb				1	4	
1964-06-14 12:15	Turkey	38.080	38.475	10.4	5.5 mb				8		
1964-06-16 04:01	Japan (see 1964 Niigata earthquake)	38.434	139.226	13.1	7.5 M_{uk}	T,F			26	25	
1964-07-06 07:22	Mexico	18.194	-100.510	92.7	7.2 mb				30		
1964-10-06 14:31	Turkey	40.250	28.208	31	6.0 mb				23	23	
1965-01-24 00:11	Indonesia (see 1965 Ceram Sea earthquake)	-2.455	125.965	28.4	8.2 M_{w}	T			71		
1965-02-23 22:11	Chile	-25.667	-70.710	38.5	6.5 M_{s}				1		
1965-03-09 17:57	Greece	39.229	23.825	4.7	5.6 mb				2	38	
1965-03-28 16:33	Chile (see 1965 Valparaíso earthquake and the El Cobre dam failures)	-32.492	-71.212	69.9	7.4 mb	Lq,L			337	400	
1965-03-31 09:47	Greece	38.339	22.299	50.3	6.3 mb				6		
1965-04-19 23:42	Japan	34.842	138.278	38.7	5.6 mb				2		
1965-04-29 15:28	United States	47.317	-122.335	65.4	6.5 mb				7	7	
1965-07-06 03:18	Greece	38.391	22.426	23.3	5.8 mb	T			1		
1965-08-23 19:46	Mexico (see 1965 Oaxaca earthquake)	16.178	-95.846	10.5	7.4 M_{w}	T			5		
1965-11-13 04:33	China	43.840	87.755	51.6	7.0 M_{uk}				7		
1966-02-05 02:01	Greece	39.044	21.757	21.4	6.2 M_{uk}				1		
1966-02-05 15:12	China	26.160	103.171	9.2	5.6 mb				371		
1966-03-07 21:29	China	37.388	114.963	7.7	6.6 M_{w}					0	
1966-03-12 16:31	Japan	24.307	122.695	28.9	7.4 M_{w}	T			7		
1966-03-20 01:42	Democratic Republic of the Congo	0.842	29.873	15	7.2 M_{uk}				200	128	
1966-03-22 08:11	China (see 1966 Xingtai earthquakes)	37.551	114.991	17.7	5.6 mb				8064		
1966-04-25 23:22	Uzbekistan (see 1966 Tashkent earthquake)				5 M_{L}					10|	
1966-06-27 10:41	Nepal	29.554	80.854	22.7	6.0 mb				80	80	
1966-08-01 21:02	Pakistan	30.051	68.629	9.8	7.0 M_{uk}				2		
1966-08-15 02:15	India	28.616	78.892	25	5.6 mb				15		
1966-08-19 12:22	Turkey (see 1966 Varto earthquake)	39.161	41.580	17.5	5.8 mb				2517	2394	
1966-09-28 14:00	China	27.457	100.089	5.5	5.8 mb				32		
1966-10-17 21:41	Peru	-10.807	-78.684	20.7	8.2 M_{w}	T			110	120	
1966-10-29 02:39	Greece	38.874	21.176	11.3	5.7 mb				1		
1966-12-28 08:18	Chile	-25.502	-70.655	30	7.7 M_{w}	T			3	4	
1967-02-09 15:24	Colombia	2.889	-74.799	40.4	7.2 M_{w}				98	61	
1967-02-19 22:14	Indonesia	-9.168	112.946	97.9	5.9 mb				54	54	
1967-03-27 08:58	China	38.516	116.601	26.8	5.5 mb				9		
1967-04-12 04:51	Indonesia	5.084	96.232	18.6	6.1 mb	T			14		
1967-05-01 07:09	Greece	39.552	21.291	13	5.9 M_{uk}				9		
1967-07-22 16:56	Turkey (see 1967 Mudurnu earthquake)	40.632	30.740	4.2	7.4 M_{w}				173	183	
1967-07-26 18:52	Turkey	39.502	40.408	8.7	5.6 mb				110		
1967-07-29 10:24	Colombia	6.788	-73.073	160.9	5.9 mb				20		
1967-07-29 20:05	Venezuela (see 1967 Caracas earthquake)	10.555	-67.310	23.7	6.5 mb				240	240	
1967-08-30 04:22	China	31.631	100.232	8.1	7.0 M_{uk}				39		
1967-10-25 00:59	Taiwan	24.464	122.221	67.1	7.0 mb				2		
1967-11-30 07:23	Albania	41.379	20.456	36.5	5.8 mb				18	7	
1967-12-10 22:51	India (see 1967 Koynanagar earthquake)	17.394	73.774	10.7	6.3 M_{uk}				180	177	
1967-12-21 02:25	Chile	-21.864	-69.948	42.5	7.4 M_{w}	T			1		
1968-01-14	Italy (see 1968 Belice earthquake)	38	13		6.4 M_{uk}						380
1968-02-19 22:45	Greece	39.372	24.946	8.1	7.2 M_{w}	T			20	19	
1968-04-01 00:42	Japan	32.482	132.192	30.2	7.5 M_{w}	T			1		
1968-05-16 00:49	Japan	40.903	143.346	25.8	8.3 M_{w}	T			52	47	
1968-05-23 17:24	New Zealand	-41.743	172.123	46.7	7.2 M_{w}				3		
1968-06-19 08:13	Peru	-5.558	-77.151	15.6	6.9 M_{s}				46	11	
1968-07-02 03:44	Mexico	17.515	-100.259	58.3	5.7 mb				1		
1968-08-01 20:19	Philippines (see 1968 Casiguran earthquake)	16.384	122.078	52.2	7.7 M_{w}	T			207	271	
1968-08-02 14:06	Mexico	16.494	-97.771	49.8	7.3 M_{w}				18		
1968-08-14 22:14	Indonesia (see 1969 Sulawesi earthquake)	0.058	119.690	18.8	7.3 M_{w}	T			392		
1968-08-31 10:47	Iran (see 1968 Dasht-e Bayaz and Ferdows earthquakes)	34.045	58.960	12.3	7.2 M_{w}				15000	10000	
1968-09-01 07:27	Iran (see 1968 Dasht-e Bayaz and Ferdows earthquakes)	34.072	58.212	8.8	6.3 M_{s}		2000	2000	900	10000	
1968-09-03 08:19	Turkey	41.771	32.452	4.9	5.7 mb	T	25	25	29	29	
1968-09-20 06:00	Venezuela	10.731	-62.719	102.6	6.2 mb	T	2	2	3		
1968-09-25 10:38	Mexico	15.551	-92.660	122.4	5.8 mb	T	15	15	48	15	
1969-02-11 22:08	China	41.426	79.239	13.1	7.1 M_{uk}				2		
1969-02-23 00:37	Indonesia	-3.179	118.799	60.6	5.9 mb	T			600		
1969-02-28 02:40	Portugal (see 1969 Portugal earthquake)	35.923	-10.568	32.5	7.8 M_{w}	T	13	13	13		
1969-03-28 01:48	Turkey	38.535	28.467	9.3	6.4 M_{s}		53	53	53	41	
1969-03-29 09:15	Ethiopia	11.939	41.219	12	6.3 M_{s}		24	24	40	24	
1969-03-31 07:15	Egypt	27.511	33.936	3.5	6.8 M_{s}		2	2	2		
1969-07-18 05:24	China (see 1969 Bohai earthquake)	38.421	119.453	12	7.2 M_{w}				10		
1969-07-25 22:49	China (see 1969 Yangjiang earthquake)	21.612	111.809	3.4	5.9 M_{s}		3000	3000	33	3000	
1969-09-09 05:15	Japan	35.786	137.093	7.5	6.0 M_{s}		0	0	1		
1969-09-29 20:03	South Africa	-33.190	19.336	15	6.3 M_{s}		12	12	12	9	
1969-10-01 05:05	Peru	-11.835	-75.195	6.5	6.2 M_{s}		136	136	136	150	
1969-10-02 06:19	United States (see 1969 Santa Rosa earthquakes)	38.300	-122.764	15	5.7 M_{uk}				1		
1969-10-26 15:36	Bosnia and Herzegovina	44.807	17.353	15	5.6 M_{s}		14	14	20	15	
1969-10-27 08:10	Bosnia and Herzegovina	44.837	17.234	15	6.1 M_{s}				9		
1970-01-04 17:00	China (see 1970 Tonghai earthquake)	24.147	102.462	14	7.2 M_{w}				15621	10000	
1970-01-20 17:33	Japan	42.523	143.024	34.9	6.4 M_{s}		1	1			
1970-02-05 22:05	Philippines	12.600	122.058	7.7	6.6 M_{s}		3	3	3		
1970-03-28 21:02	Turkey (see 1970 Gediz earthquake)	39.172	29.550	24.2	7.4 M_{uk}		1086	1086	1086	1086	
1970-04-07 05:34	Philippines	15.772	121.659	28.3	7.2 M_{w}		14	14	15	14	
1970-05-14 09:20	Russi	43.079	47.080	13.2	5.5 mb						
1970-05-14 18:12	Russia	43.102	47.071	12.7	6.5 M_{s}						
1970-05-31 20:23	Peru (see 1970 Ancash earthquake)	-9.248	-78.840	73	7.9 M_{uk}	L	0	70000	66794	66794	
1970-06-05 04:53	Kyrgyzstan	42.492	78.719	4	6.6 M_{s}						
1970-07-30 00:52	Iran	37.836	55.887	10.9	6.6 M_{s}		176	176	220	176	
1970-07-31 17:08	Colombia	-1.486	-72.563	644.6	8.0 M_{uk}		1	1	1		
1970-10-31 17:53	Papua New Guinea (see 1970 New Guinea earthquake)	-4.907	145.471	8.1	7.3 M_{uk}	T,L	15	15	5	15	
1970-11-14 07:58	Taiwan	22.839	121.363	27.6	6.1 M_{s}		2	2	2		
1970-12-10 04:34	Peru	-4.079	-80.662	20.1	7.1 M_{w}		81	81	81	29	
1971-02-09 14:00	United States (see 1971 San Fernando earthquake)	34.401	-118.392	6.4	6.7 M_{uk}	L,Lq	65	65	58	65	
1971-04-03 04:49	China	32.178	95.028	15	5.6 mb				1		
1971-04-12 19:03	Iran	28.264	55.608	5.6	5.9 M_{s}				1		
1971-04-28 15:32	China	22.953	100.993	8	6.3 M_{s}				2		
1971-05-12 06:25	Turkey	37.555	29.746	28.8	5.9 M_{s}		100	100	57		
1971-05-22 16:44	Turkey (see 1971 Bingöl earthquake)	38.868	40.542	3.6	6.7 M_{s}		1000	1000	995	878	
1971-06-17 21:00	Chile	-25.423	-69.052	90.1	7.2 mb		1	1	1		
1971-07-09 03:03	Chile	-32.558	-71.085	59	7.8 M_{w}	T	83	83	83	85	
1971-07-14 06:11	Papua New Guinea (see 1971 Solomon Islands earthquakes)	-5.519	153.906	44.5	8.0 M_{w}	T	0	1	2		
1971-07-26 01:48	China	39.848	77.246	41.1	5.8 mb				1		
1971-07-27 02:02	Ecuador	-2.825	-77.362	94.5	7.3 mb		1	1	1		
1971-08-16 04:58	China	28.879	103.672	22.7	5.5 mb				10		
1971-10-12 09:45	Guatemala	15.797	-91.137	35.5	5.7 M_{s}				2		
1971-10-15 10:33	Peru	-14.183	-73.399	80	5.7 mb		5	5	14		
1971-10-27 17:58	Vanuatu	-15.578	167.320	60.9	6.3 mb		1	1	1		
1972-01-25 02:06	Taiwan	22.549	122.325	10.1	7.5 M_{w}	T	1	1	1		
1972-03-20 07:33	Peru	-6.810	-76.780	49.8	6.9 M_{uk}		7	7	7		
1972-04-10 02:06	Iran (see 1972 Qir earthquake)	28.408	52.789	6	6.7 M_{w}		5054	5054	5010	5057	
1972-04-24 09:57	Taiwan (see 1972 Ruisui earthquake)	23.604	121.534	21	6.9 M_{s}		4	4	5		
1972-06-24 15:29	Afghanistan	36.255	69.684	31.1	6.1 M_{s}		11	11	11		
1972-09-03 16:48	Pakistan	35.949	73.321	32.9	6.2 M_{s}		100	100	100		
1972-12-23 06:29	Nicaragua (see 1972 Nicaragua earthquake)	12.347	-86.128	7.3	6.2 M_{s}		5000	5000	10000	10000	
1973-01-30 21:01	Mexico (see 1973 Colima earthquake)	18.455	-102.960	37.2	7.5 M_{s}	T	17	17	56	17	
1973-02-06 10:37	China (see 1973 Luhuo earthquake)	31.353	100.545	10	7.7 M_{uk}				2199		
1973-03-17 08:30	Philippines	13.415	122.804	44.3	7.5 M_{uk}	T	15	15	15	14	
1973-04-14 08:34	Costa Rica	10.673	-84.860	30.3	6.5 M_{s}		26	26	26		
1973-04-24 21:30	Colombia	4.907	-78.114	28.8	6.6 M_{uk}		1	1	1		
1973-08-16 03:58	China	23.003	101.078	6.4	6.4 M_{s}				1		
1973-08-28 09:50	Mexico (see 1973 Veracruz earthquake)	18.233	-96.608	80.6	7.2 M_{uk}		600	600	600	500	
1973-11-11 07:14	Iran	30.535	52.951	2	5.5 mb		1	1	1		
1973-11-23 13:36	Portugal	38.486	-28.329	18.5	5.2 M_{uk}		1	1	1		
1973-11-24 14:05	Algeria	36.201	4.473	33.1	5.1 mb		4	4	4		
1974-01-05 08:33	Peru	-12.351	-76.307	91.9	6.6 M_{uk}		10	10	10		
1974-02-01 00:01	Turkey	38.540	27.263	11.9	5.4 M_{L}		2	2			
1974-04-22 00:29	China	31.533	119.280	14.2	5.5 M_{s}				8		
1974-05-08 23:33	Japan	34.570	138.771	11.3	6.7 M_{uk}	T	27	27	30	30	
1974-05-10 19:25	China (see 1974 Zhaotong earthquake)	28.195	104.007	10.2	6.8 M_{s}				1541		
1974-06-12 16:25	Venezuela	10.509	-63.429	7.9	6.5 M_{uk}		3	3	5		
1974-07-13 01:18	Panama	7.737	-77.631	3.8	7.3 M_{s}		11	11	11		
1974-08-03 18:16	Japan	36.016	139.901	51.4	5.6 mb		2	2			
1974-10-02 02:54	Peru	-5.882	-81.019	20.5	5.7 mb					78	
1974-10-03 14:21	Peru	-12.254	-77.523	33.5	8.1 M_{w}	T	78	78	78		
1974-12-28 12:11	Pakistan (see 1974 Pattan earthquake)	35.026	72.898	12.5	6.2 M_{s}		5300	5300	5300		
1975-01-19 08:02	India (see 1975 Kinnaur earthquake)	32.373	78.474	5	6.8 M_{s}		47	47	47	47	
1975-02-04 11:36	China (see 1975 Haicheng earthquake)	40.667	122.646	8	7.0 M_{w}				1328	10000	2041
1975-02-09 04:45	Indonesia	-6.774	106.634	15	5.6 M_{s}		1	1	1		
1975-03-07 07:04	Iran	27.477	56.224	11	6.1 M_{s}		7	7	7		
1975-03-13 15:26	Chile	-29.910	-71.393	31.3	6.9 M_{s}	T	2	2	2		
1975-04-05 09:34	Venezuela	10.065	-69.666	22.4	6.3 M_{uk}		3	3	3		
1975-07-08 12:04	Myanmar (see 1975 Bagan earthquake)	21.452	94.598	117.6	6.5 mb				1		
1975-07-11 07:18	Algeria	36.320	5.241	33	4.3 mb		1	1	1		
1975-07-19 06:10	India	31.937	78.605	12.8	5.3 mb		2	2			
1975-09-06 09:20	Turkey (see 1975 Lice earthquake)	38.515	40.768	39.6	6.7 M_{s}		2311	2311	2370	2385	
1975-10-31 08:28	Philippines	12.535	125.997	52.5	7.6 M_{uk}	T	1	1	1		
1975-11-05 17:04	Mexico	16.900	-92.818	12	5.0 mb		1	1			
1975-11-29 14:47	United States Minor Outlying Islands	19.452	-155.034	2.1	7.2 M_{s}	T	2	2	2		
1975-12-30 14:36	Turkey	38.595	40.526	31.8	4.6 mb		3	3			
1975-12-31 09:45	Greece	38.526	21.714	15	5.5 M_{s}		1	1	1		
1976-01-13 13:29	Iceland	66.226	-16.578	15	6.3 M_{w}					1	
1976-02-04 09:01	Guatemala (see 1976 Guatemala earthquake)	15.296	-89.145	12.3	7.5 M_{w}	T	23000	23000	22870	23000	
1976-02-04 09:30	Guatemala (see 1976 Guatemala earthquake)	14.812	-90.469	60.4	5.4 mb						
1976-02-19 13:59	Cuba	19.864	-76.899	21.1	5.9 M_{s}		1	1	1		
1976-03-13 16:30	Guatemala	14.725	-91.006	15	5.4 mb	L	4	4	4		
1976-03-19 13:03	Afghanistan	36.587	67.758	18.2	5.6 mb	L	49	49	49	50	
1976-03-25 11:55	Turkey	40.939	42.954	35	4.8 mb		1	1	1	2	
1976-04-02 16:58	Turkey	39.801	43.689	25	4.6 mb		4	4	4		
1976-04-05 16:54	China	40.230	112.222	7	5.5 M_{s}				28		
1976-04-09 07:08	Ecuador	0.850	-79.564	17	6.6 M_{w}		8	8	8	10	
1976-04-29 22:18	Turkey	40.935	42.875	35	5.5 M_{s}		4	4	4		
1976-05-06 20:00	Italy (see 1976 Friuli earthquake)	46.385	13.266	20.7	6.5 M_{w}		900	900	965	922	
1976-05-15 21:55	Peru	-11.660	-74.419	19	6.7 M_{w}	L	5	5	5		
1976-05-17 02:58	Uzbekistan	40.373	63.428	14.8	6.7 M_{w}		6	6	6	0	
1976-05-29 12:23	China 1976 Longling earthquakes)	24.501	98.930	6.5	6.7 M_{w}				98		
1976-05-29 14:00	China 1976 Longling earthquakes)	24.581	98.610	7.6	6.6 M_{w}						
1976-06-25 19:18	Indonesia (see 1976 Papua earthquake)	-4.531	140.109	15	7.1 M_{w}	L	422	7422	6000	420	
1976-07-09 09:34	Turkey	38.327	40.463	33	4.2 mb		1	1	1		
1976-07-14 07:13	Indonesia	-8.228	114.774	24.8	6.5 M_{w}		563	563	563	573	
1976-07-21 15:10	China	24.768	98.667	4.3	6.1 M_{w}				11		
1976-07-27 19:42	China (see 1976 Tangshan earthquake)	39.605	117.888	16.7	7.6 M_{w}		655237	655237	242800	242000	
1976-07-28 10:45	China	39.723	118.359	18.2	7.0 M_{w}						
1976-08-16 14:06	China (see 1976 Songpan-Pingwu earthquake)	32.753	104.088	10.7	6.7 M_{w}					0	
1976-08-16 16:11	Philippines (see 1976 Moro Gulf earthquake)	6.292	124.089	57.9	8.0 M_{w}	T		6500	8000	6000	
1976-08-17 04:19	Philippines	7.259	122.960	20.2	7.1 M_{w}						
1976-08-19 01:12	Turkey	37.743	29.015	11.7	5.0 mb		4	4	4	4	
1976-08-23 03:30	China	32.481	104.182	7.9	6.4 M_{w}				41		
1976-09-11 16:31	Italy	46.339	13.181	4.2	5.5 M_{s}	L	5	5	5		
1976-09-15 03:15	Italy (see 1976 Friuli earthquake)	46.314	13.206	0.9	6.0 M_{w}		11	11	11		
1976-09-15 09:21	Italy	46.354	13.087	9.7	5.9 M_{s}		0	0	2		
1976-10-06 09:12	Ecuador	-0.726	-78.732	4.7	5.7 mb		9	9	9		
1976-10-29 02:51	Indonesia	-4.475	139.991	15	6.8 M_{w}		133	133	6000		
1976-11-06 18:04	China	27.554	101.021	7.7	6.3 M_{w}				33		
1976-11-07 04:00	Iran	33.820	59.180	6.5	6.0 M_{w}		17	17	17	16	
1976-11-24 12:22	Turkey (see 1976 Çaldıran–Muradiye earthquake)	39.082	44.031	8.9	7.0 M_{w}		5000	5000	3900	3840	
1976-11-30 00:40	Chile	-20.472	-68.896	133.7	7.5 M_{w}		1	1	1		
1976-12-08 08:38	South Africa	-27.979	26.677	10	5.2 mb		4	4	4		
1976-12-13 06:36	China	27.336	101.024	3.4	5.9 M_{s}				2		
1977-01-01 21:39	China	38.185	91.014	5.3	6.0 M_{w}				2		
1977-03-04 21:21	Romania (see 1977 Vrancea earthquake)	45.776	26.702	89	7.5 M_{w}				1581	1641	
1977-03-18 21:43	Philippines	16.755	122.285	32.5	7.2 M_{w}		1	1	1	1	
1977-03-21 21:18	Iran	27.583	56.363	12	6.7 M_{w}		167	167	167	167	
1977-03-25 02:39	Turkey	38.647	40.057	17.4	5.3 M_{w}		30	30	30	30	
1977-04-06 13:36	Iran	31.954	50.643	9.4	6.0 M_{w}		348	348	366	352	
1977-04-21 04:24	Solomon Islands	-10.009	160.816	45.1	7.3 M_{w}	T	0	18	18		
1977-05-26 01:35	Iran	38.896	44.324	16.9	5.6 M_{w}		3	3	3	3	
1977-08-19 05:08	Indonesia	-11.180	118.370	29.4	5.7 M_{w}	T				185	
1977-08-19 06:08	Indonesia 1977 Sumba earthquake)	-11.126	118.380	22.6	8.3 M_{w}	T		189	189		
1977-08-27 07:12	Indonesia	-8.136	125.326	44.6	7.0 M_{w}		2	2	2		
1977-08-31 00:42	Colombia	7.351	-76.159	21.3	6.5 M_{w}		3	3	3		
1977-11-23 09:26	Argentina (see 1977 San Juan earthquake)	-31.082	-67.780	19.5	7.4 M_{w}	L,Lq	70	70	70		
1977-12-10 05:46	Iran	27.687	56.578	13.9	5.6 M_{w}		3	3		3	
1977-12-19 23:34	Iran	30.911	56.413	11.6	5.9 M_{w}		584	584	665	589	
1978-01-14 03:24	Japan	34.803	139.294	10.7	6.6 M_{w}	T	21	25	25	21	
1978-02-22 06:07	Guatemala	14.268	-91.399	66.9	6.3 M_{w}		2	2	2		
1978-03-11 19:20	Italy	38.046	15.990	22.2	5.2 M_{w}		2	2	2		
1978-03-16 02:00	Afghanistan	29.928	66.234	10.2	6.1 M_{w}		1	1			
1978-03-19 01:39	Mexico	16.932	-99.782	11	6.6 M_{w}		1	1	1		
1978-04-15 23:33	Italy	38.381	15.073	17	6.0 M_{w}		5	5	5		
1978-06-12 08:06	Japan	38.235	142.105	46.2	5.7 mb	T			28		
1978-06-12 08:14	Japan (see 1978 Miyagi earthquake)	38.224	142.009	53.3	7.6 M_{w}		22	22			
1978-06-19 10:31	Greece	40.732	23.257	7.7	5.3 M_{w}		1	1	1	50	
1978-06-20 20:03	Greece (see 1978 Thessaloniki earthquake)	40.760	23.303	7.4	6.5 M_{w}		50	50	50		
1978-07-04 22:23	Greece	40.718	23.112	7.4	4.6 M_{L}		1	1	1		
1978-07-29 14:37	Guatemala	14.758	-90.990	15	4.9 mb		5	5	17		
1978-09-16 15:35	Iran (see 1978 Tabas earthquake)	33.242	57.382	8.2	7.4 M_{w}		15000	15000	18220	25000	
1978-11-29 19:52	Mexico (see 1978 Oaxaca earthquake)	16.011	-96.603	24.8	7.8 M_{w}	T	9	9	9	9	
1978-12-14 07:05	Iran	32.128	49.634	18.9	6.1 M_{w}		76	76	76	45	
1978-12-23 11:23	Taiwan	23.217	122.009	45.5	7.0 M_{w}		2	2	2		
1979-01-16 09:50	Iran	33.909	59.471	9.9	6.5 M_{w}		200	200	200		
1979-02-16 10:08	Peru	-16.537	-72.553	55.1	7.1 M_{w}		18	18	18	13	
1979-03-14 11:07	Mexico	17.758	-101.221	24.7	7.4 M_{w}	T	5	5	15	5	
1979-03-15 12:52	China	23.162	101.106	13.5	6.0 M_{w}				12		
1979-04-15 06:19	Montenegro (see 1979 Montenegro earthquake)	41.999	19.156	15	6.9 M_{w}	T	156	156	129	121	
1979-05-30 09:38	Indonesia	-8.345	115.864	20	6.2 M_{w}		37	37	22	34	
1979-07-02 16:30	India	34.525	74.291	35	4.5 mb		0	3			
1979-07-09 10:57	China	31.472	119.270	12.6	5.4 M_{w}		41	41	42		
1979-09-12 05:17	Indonesia	-1.682	135.974	17.6	7.5 M_{w}	T	15	15	15	2	
1979-09-19 21:35	Italy	42.773	13.010	15	5.8 M_{w}		5	5	5	5	
1979-10-20 01:41	Indonesia	-8.363	115.782	52	6.4 M_{w}		2	2	2		
1979-10-27 14:35	Guatemala	13.829	-90.841	56.5	6.8 M_{w}		4	4	7		
1979-11-02 15:53	Indonesia	-7.746	108.165	72.1	6.5 M_{w}		30	30	23	26	
1979-11-06 05:26	Greece	39.520	20.375	28.1	5.4 mb		1	1	1		
1979-11-14 02:21	Iran	33.956	59.726	9.1	6.5 M_{w}		280	280	280	350	
1979-11-23 23:40	Colombia	4.793	-76.190	107.7	7.2 M_{w}	L	52	52	52	60	
1979-11-27 17:10	Iran	34.056	59.754	7.4	7.0 M_{w}		17	17	17	16	
1979-12-12 07:59	Colombia	1.603	-79.363	23.6	8.1 M_{w}	T	600	600	600	300	
1979-12-15 00:02	Indonesia	-3.339	102.567	13	6.5 M_{w}		8	8	8	5	
1979-12-17 19:58	Indonesia	-8.487	115.753	15	6.5 M_{w}		27	27	32	32	
1980-01-01 16:42	Portugal (see 1980 Azores Islands earthquake)	38.726	-27.751	12.2	6.9 M_{w}		60	60	56	69	
1980-01-24 19:00	United States	37.712	-121.728	15	5.8 M_{w}		0	0	1		
1980-02-20 02:34	Italy	39.291	16.152	8.2	4.8 M_{L}		0	1			
1980-06-09 03:28	Mexico	32.268	-114.908	4.6	6.3 M_{w}		1	1	1		
1980-07-09 02:11	Greece	39.257	23.008	17.2	6.6 M_{w}		1	1	1		
1980-07-22 05:17	Iran	37.322	50.262	25	5.5 M_{w}		1	1	1		
1980-07-29 14:58	Nepal	29.623	81.103	14.4	6.5 M_{w}		188	188	100	100	
1980-08-09 05:45	Guatemala	15.912	-88.490	16.9	6.5 M_{w}		2	2	2	2	
1980-08-18 15:07	Ecuador	-1.987	-80.002	55.9	5.9 M_{w}		8	8	8	8	
1980-08-23 21:36	India	32.922	75.693	14.5	5.5 M_{w}		15	15	15	13	
1980-08-23 21:50	India	32.893	75.776	11.3	5.5 M_{w}				13		
1980-09-23 19:10	Japan	35.997	139.740	82.7	5.3 M_{w}		1	1		2	
1980-09-24 17:54	Japan	35.525	140.062	71.5	6.0 M_{w}		2	2			
1980-10-10 12:25	Algeria (see 1980 El Asnam earthquake)	36.143	1.404	15	7.1 M_{w}		5000	5000	3500	2633	
1980-10-10 15:39	Algeria	36.213	1.577	12.4	6.2 M_{w}						
1980-10-24 14:53	Mexico (see 1980 Oaxaca earthquake)	18.175	-98.235	64.3	7.1 M_{w}		300	300	65	65	
1980-11-12 06:58	Peru	-13.347	-74.545	71	4.9 mb		7	7	7		
1980-11-19 19:00	India	27.392	88.795	38.5	6.3 M_{w}		0	0	3	0	
1980-11-23 18:34	Italy (see 1980 Irpinia earthquake)	40.788	15.310	6.9	6.9 M_{w}		3000	4900	2483	4689	
1980-11-30 07:41	Italy	40.766	15.295	15.1	4.9 M_{L}		0	1			
1980-12-19 01:16	Iran	34.472	50.643	12.7	6.2 M_{w}		26	26	26	20	
1980-12-22 12:51	Iran	34.427	50.634	16.4	5.7 M_{w}		3	3	3	4	
1981-01-19 15:11	Indonesia (see 1981 Irian Jaya earthquake)	-4.513	139.283	20	6.6 M_{w}		305	1305	1300		
1981-01-23 21:13	China (see 1981 Dawu earthquake)	30.956	101.168	10.9	6.5 M_{w}		150	150	126	150	
1981-02-14 17:27	Italy	40.995	14.614	4.9	4.9 M_{L}		4	12			
1981-02-18 08:28	South Africa	-26.625	26.607	33	4.7 mb		0	4	4		
1981-02-24 20:53	Greece	38.159	22.976	16.2	6.7 M_{w}		16	16	21	22	
1981-02-25 02:35	Greece	38.097	23.170	6	6.4 M_{w}						
1981-03-04 21:58	Greece	38.197	23.300	14.9	6.2 M_{w}		0	1			
1981-03-07 11:34	Greece	38.181	23.335	37.1	5.4 M_{w}		1	1	1		
1981-03-10 15:16	Greece	39.382	20.813	36.4	5.4 M_{w}	L	0	2	2	2	
1981-04-18 00:32	Peru	-13.116	-74.373	40.8	5.5 M_{w}		8	8	8	8	
1981-06-11 07:24	Iran (see 1981 Golbaf earthquake)	29.858	57.686	17.3	6.6 M_{w}		3000	3000	3000	2000	
1981-06-13 07:29	Afghanistan	36.198	67.836	21	5.6 M_{w}		1	1	1		
1981-06-21 10:30	Chile	-20.276	-70.384	36	5.7 M_{w}					10	
1981-06-22 17:53	Peru	-13.185	-74.463	15.6	5.8 M_{w}		6	6	6		
1981-07-28 17:22	Iran (see 1981 Sirch earthquake)	29.976	57.767	13.6	7.2 M_{w}		1500	1500	1500	1200	
1981-09-12 07:15	Pakistan	35.685	73.597	14.7	6.1 M_{w}	L	220	220	229	250	
1981-10-16 03:25	Chile	-33.178	-73.033	44.9	7.1 M_{w}		0	1	1		
1981-10-18 04:31	Colombia	8.111	-72.501	39.3	5.9 M_{w}	L	15	15	15	10	
1981-10-25 03:22	Mexico	18.115	-102.009	19	7.2 M_{w}		3	3	9	3	
1981-12-12 20:26	Pakistan	29.912	67.080	35	4.6 mb		6	6	6		
1982-01-23 14:10	Taiwan	23.951	121.752	11.8	6.0 M_{w}				1		
1982-03-23 05:10	Peru	-12.341	-77.538	59.1	5.1 mb		2	2	2		
1982-03-28 23:24	Peru	-12.743	-76.010	90.8	6.3 M_{w}		3	3	3	3	
1982-04-13 11:26	South Africa	-27.926	26.783	5	5.0 mb	L	0	1	1		
1982-06-07 10:59	Mexico	16.518	-98.347	18.9	6.9 M_{w}		9	9	9		
1982-06-15 23:24	China	31.871	99.872	10.3	5.6 M_{w}		10	10	11	10	
1982-06-19 06:21	El Salvador (see 1982 El Salvador earthquake)	13.337	-89.313	72.8	7.3 M_{w}	L	43	43	43		
1982-09-29 05:50	Honduras	14.494	-89.102	13.9	5.6 M_{w}		3	3	3		
1982-11-15 20:07	Algeria	35.585	1.361	7.1	5.2 M_{w}		3	3	3		
1982-11-16 23:41	Albania	40.780	19.666	21.9	5.6 M_{w}		1	1	1	1	
1982-12-13 09:12	Yemen (see 1982 North Yemen earthquake)	14.675	44.223	7	6.2 M_{w}	L	2800	2800	2800	1507	
1982-12-16 00:40	Afghanistan	36.136	68.933	35.5	6.4 M_{w}		450	450	500	500	
1982-12-25 12:28	Indonesia	-8.430	122.970	6.7	5.9 M_{w}	L	13	13	13	13	
1983-02-13 01:40	China	39.994	75.173	9	6.2 M_{w}		0	0	1		
1983-02-25 18:22	Yugoslavia	41.959	21.540	24	4.7 mb		0	12		12	
1983-03-15 17:27	Japan	34.797	137.580	34.5	5.4 M_{w}		1	1			
1983-03-25 11:57	Iran	36.042	52.295	14.6	5.4 M_{w}	L	30	30	100	30	
1983-03-31 13:12	Colombia (see 1983 Popayán earthquake)	2.439	-76.659	30.1	5.6 M_{w}		300	300	241	250	
1983-04-03 02:50	Costa Rica	8.721	-83.078	25	7.4 M_{w}		1	6	1	10	
1983-04-04 02:51	Indonesia	5.722	94.687	85.6	7.0 M_{w}					0	
1983-04-05 06:50	China	39.972	75.215	10.7	5.8 M_{w}						
1983-04-12 12:07	Peru	-4.846	-78.091	125.9	7.0 M_{w}				10		
1983-05-26 02:59	Japan	40.473	139.091	17	7.7 M_{w}	T	104	107	104	102	
1983-07-03 17:14	Costa Rica	9.612	-83.707	14.5	6.3 M_{w}	L	2	2	2	2	
1983-07-05 12:01	Turkey (see 1983 Biga earthquake)	40.309	27.254	2.6	6.1 M_{w}		5	5	5		
1983-07-20 22:03	Italy	37.502	15.151	33	4.4 mb		0	1			
1983-07-22 02:41	Iran	36.942	49.213	20	5.6 mb		3	3	3	3	
1983-08-02 09:01	France	49.150	6.698	0	3.5 M_{L}		0	1	1		
1983-08-08 03:47	Japan	35.507	139.045	18.1	5.6 M_{w}	L	1	1	1	1	
1983-08-17 12:17	Philippines	18.206	120.785	29	6.6 M_{w}	L,Lq	16	16	24	19	
1983-10-04 18:52	Chile	-26.539	-70.502	23.9	7.6 M_{w}	T,L	5	5	5		
1983-10-25 00:36	Indonesia	1.151	120.841	26.6	6.5 M_{w}				2		
1983-10-28 14:06	United States (see 1983 Borah Peak earthquake)	44.078	-113.800	16	6.9 M_{w}	L	2	2	2	2	
1983-10-30 04:12	Turkey (see 1983 Erzurum earthquake)	40.327	42.176	15	6.6 M_{w}		1342	1342	1400	1346	
1983-11-06 21:09	China	35.223	115.204	32.1	5.5 M_{w}		34	34	45	34	
1983-11-08 00:49	Belgium	50.696	5.346	10	4.9 M_{L}		1	2	1	2	
1983-12-16 13:15	Tajikistan	39.351	72.929	13.3	5.9 M_{w}					12	
1983-12-21 23:32	Papua New Guinea	-5.446	151.895	42.2	6.2 M_{w}				10	10	
1983-12-22 04:11	Guinea	11.862	-13.511	7.8	6.3 M_{w}		443	643	643	275	
1983-12-30 23:52	Afghanistan	36.405	70.677	215.9	7.4 M_{w}		26	26	12	24	
1984-01-08 15:24	Indonesia	-2.866	118.726	43.6	6.7 M_{w}	T	2	2	2	2	
1984-01-25 19:36	United States	47.500	-116.000	1	2.3 M_{L}		0	1	1		
1984-02-01 14:22	Afghanistan	34.564	70.446	9	6.1 M_{w}		1	1	1	1	
1984-02-16 17:18	Afghanistan	36.447	70.840	208.1	6.4 M_{w}		4	4	4	4	
1984-03-06 02:17	Japan	29.372	138.871	459.1	7.4 M_{w}		0	1			
1984-04-22 17:39	Italy	43.616	10.194	15	4.7 M_{L}		0	3			
1984-05-07 17:49	Italy	41.738	13.889	21.4	5.9 M_{w}		3	3	7	3	
1984-05-11 10:41	Italy	41.755	13.901	10.9	5.5 M_{w}		0	3			
1984-05-13 12:45	Bosnia and Herzegovina	42.974	17.829	37	5.4 M_{w}		0	1	1		
1984-05-21 15:37	China	32.604	121.602	43.8	6.0 M_{w}				13		
1984-06-20 14:12	Canada	46.580	-80.800	1	3.4 Lg		0	4	4		
1984-06-24 11:17	Dominican Republic	17.981	-69.371	45.1	6.7 M_{w}				5		
1984-06-24 18:18	Dominican Republic	18.039	-69.233	24.8	5.2 M_{w}		5	5			
1984-09-13 23:48	Japan (see 1984 Nagano earthquake)	35.801	137.466	1.1	6.2 M_{w}	L	24	24	29	20	
1984-09-15 02:55	United States	47.460	-115.987	1	2.8 M_{L}		0	1			
1984-09-18 13:26	Turkey	40.892	42.241	10	5.5 M_{w}		3	3	3	3	
1984-10-18 09:46	Turkey	40.711	42.447	35	5.4 M_{w}		3	3	3	3	
1984-12-30 23:33	India	24.684	92.864	3.4	6.0 M_{w}		20	20		20	
1985-01-26 03:06	Argentina (see 1985 Mendoza earthquake)	-33.109	-68.593	19.2	5.9 M_{w}		6	6	6	6	
1985-02-02 20:52	Iran	28.352	52.972	13.8	5.4 M_{w}		1	1	1	1	
1985-03-03 22:47	Chile (see 1985 Algarrobo earthquake)	-33.132	-71.762	40	7.9 M_{w}	T,Lq	177	177	177	180	
1985-03-14 23:03	Italy	41.631	14.263	14	4.3 M_{L}		0	1			
1985-03-17 10:41	Chile (see 1985 Algarrobo earthquake)	-32.712	-71.680	22	6.5 M_{w}		0	1			
1985-03-18 19:49	Philippines	7.776	123.512	26.5	6.5 M_{w}		0	2		2	
1985-03-19 10:28	Bolivia	-18.567	-63.600	29.7	5.8 M_{w}		2	2	2		
1985-03-29 11:15	China	29.350	104.953	35	4.9 mb		1	1	2		
1985-04-09 01:56	Chile (see 1985 Rapel Lake earthquake)	-34.134	-71.535	38	7.1 M_{w}		0	2			
1985-04-18 05:52	China (see 1985 Luquan earthquake)	25.891	102.885	4.1	5.7 M_{w}		23	23	22		
1985-04-24 01:07	Philippines	16.541	120.812	5.3	6.1 M_{w}	L	6	6	6		
1985-05-10 15:35	Papua New Guinea	-5.601	151.056	47.2	7.2 M_{w}	L	1	1	1		
1985-07-29 07:54	Afghanistan	36.165	70.857	100.1	7.4 M_{w}	L	5	5	5	5	
1985-08-23 12:41	China (see 1985 Wuqia earthquake)	39.447	75.264	4.3	6.9 M_{w}		71	71	67	67	
1985-09-11 20:45	China	39.356	75.415	21.2	6.1 M_{w}		4	4	3		
1985-09-15 02:42	Indonesia	-4.064	136.093	4.2	6.3 M_{w}		10	10	10	10	
1985-09-19 13:17	Mexico (see 1985 Mexico City earthquake)	18.420	-102.380	15	8.0 M_{w}	T,L	9500	9500	9500	9500	
1985-09-21 01:37	Mexico	17.831	-101.623	17.6	7.5 M_{w}	T					
1985-10-13 15:59	Tajikistan	40.337	69.810	15.9	5.8 M_{w}	L	29	29		29	
1985-10-27 19:34	Algeria	36.386	6.846	30.4	5.8 M_{w}		6	6	5	30	
1985-12-25 02:38	Italy	37.688	15.068	10	4.3 mb		1	1	1		
1986-01-11 19:42	Peru	-9.512	-77.437	56.7	5.1 M_{w}		1	1	1	1	
1986-03-12 16:32	United States	47.470	-115.800	1	2.0 M_{L}		0	1	1		
1986-04-05 20:14	Peru	-13.402	-71.757	49	5.2 M_{w}	L	16	16	16	15	
1986-04-26 07:35	India	32.118	76.397	10.2	5.5 M_{w}		6	6	6	6	
1986-05-05 03:35	Turkey	37.999	37.781	4.1	6.0 M_{w}		15	15	15	15	
1986-05-13 08:44	Georgia	41.404	43.704	10	5.7 M_{w}		2	2	2	2	
1986-05-20 05:25	Taiwan	24.146	121.643	15.8	6.2 M_{w}		1	1	1		
1986-06-06 10:39	Turkey	38.007	37.910	22.5	5.8 M_{w}	L	1	1	1		
1986-06-11 13:48	Venezuela	10.573	-62.911	13.9	6.2 M_{w}		2	2	2		
1986-07-12 07:54	Iran	29.911	51.557	5.4	5.7 M_{w}		1	1	1	1	
1986-07-13 13:47	United States	33.066	-117.840	15	5.8 M_{w}	L	0	0	1	0	
1986-07-18 17:22	Venezuela	10.743	-69.424	8.3	5.4 M_{w}		0	1		1	
1986-08-06 19:55	China	29.280	100.754	10.8	5.3 M_{w}				2		
1986-08-30 21:28	Romania (see 1986 Varencea earthquake)	45.521	26.271	136	7.2 M_{w}		2	2	2		
1986-09-13 17:24	Greece (see 1986 Kalamata earthquake)	37.072	22.176	21.7	6.0 M_{w}		20	20	21	20	
1986-10-10 17:49	El Salvador (see 1986 San Salvador earthquake)	13.791	-89.165	10.9	7.3 M_{w}	L	950	1000	1500	1100	
1986-11-14 21:20	Taiwan	23.974	121.727	34	7.3 M_{w}	L	15	15	13		
1986-12-07 14:17	Bulgaria	43.278	26.003	4.8	5.6 M_{w}		3	3	3	3	
1986-12-18 20:01	Poland	50.304	19.235	10	2.8 M_{L}		0	3	3		
1987-01-22 05:10	Italy	43.515	10.154	21	4.2 M_{L}		0	2			
1987-01-26 11:11	Algeria	35.919	1.387	11.7	4.9 mb		1	1	1	1	
1987-02-08 18:33	Papua New Guinea	-6.025	147.665	42.3	7.3 M_{w}	T,L,Lq	0	3	3	1	
1987-03-02 01:42	New Zealand (see 1987 Edgecumbe earthquake)	-38.015	176.921	15	6.5 M_{w}	L	0	1		1	
1987-03-05 09:17	Chile	-24.395	-70.100	46.3	7.5 M_{w}	T	1	1	1		
1987-03-06 01:54	Ecuador (see 1987 Ecuador earthquakes)	0.040	-77.666	12.6	6.4 M_{w}	L				5000	
1987-03-06 04:10	Ecuador	0.082	-77.787	17.1	7.1 M_{w}	L	1000	5000	5000		
1987-03-12 23:07	Poland	51.369	20.206	10	2.6 M_{L}		0	3	3		
1987-03-18 03:36	Japan	32.051	131.785	54	6.6 M_{w}	T,L	1	2	1		
1987-04-25 19:22	Indonesia	2.405	98.905	10	6.4 M_{w}		2	2	2	2	
1987-05-02 20:43	Italy	44.809	10.680	15	5.2 M_{L}		0	1			
1987-05-18 07:27	Philippines	8.267	125.324	19.1	6.2 M_{w}		1	1	1		
1987-05-23 17:09	Philippines	8.023	125.479	22.4	5.7 M_{w}		1	1	1		
1987-05-29 06:27	Iran	34.059	48.285	25	5.3 M_{w}		2	2	2	2	
1987-06-18 10:01	Philippines	17.324	121.353	13.9	5.9 M_{w}	L	0	9	9		
1987-08-02 09:07	China	25.002	115.566	11.2	4.9 mb		0	0	3	0	
1987-08-08 15:48	Chile	-19.092	-70.005	70.7	7.2 M_{w}	L	5	5	5	5	
1987-08-13 15:23	Peru	-17.900	-70.909	37.6	6.5 M_{w}		1	1	1		
1987-09-22 13:43	Ecuador (see 1987 Ecuador earthquakes)	-1.009	-78.031	4.8	6.3 M_{w}	L	2	2	2	2	
1987-10-01 14:42	United States (see 1987 Whittier Narrows earthquake)	34.061	-118.135	14.4	5.9 M_{w}		8	8	8	8	
1987-10-02 22:27	Peru (see 1987 Santiago de Chuco earthquake)	-8.166	-77.961	29.8	5.6 M_{w}		3	3	3		
1987-10-04 10:59	United States (see 1987 Whittier Narrows earthquake)	34.020	-118.137	11.3	5.2 M_{w}		0	1			
1987-11-24 01:54	United States (see 1987 Superstition Hills earthquakes)	33.257	-115.756	15	6.0 M_{w}		0	2	2	2	
1987-11-26 01:43	Indonesia	-8.259	124.149	27.3	6.5 M_{w}	T,L	37	37	83	125	
1987-12-17 02:08	Japan	35.421	140.322	47.3	6.5 M_{w}		2	2	2	2	
1988-01-05 06:41	South Africa	-26.905	26.694	15	5.2 mb		0	8	8	8	
1988-02-06 14:50	Bangladesh	24.713	91.579	35	5.8 M_{w}		2	2	2	2	
1988-02-11 15:25	United States	34.080	-118.050	12	4.8 M_{L}		0	1			
1988-06-19 20:19	Philippines	12.355	121.085	12.7	6.2 M_{w}		2	2	1		
1988-07-20 23:15	Taiwan	23.986	121.679	51	5.9 M_{w}	L	1	1	1		
1988-08-06 00:36	Myanmar (see 1988 Myanmar–India earthquake)	25.105	95.126	90.5	7.2 M_{w}	L	3	35	3	2	
1988-08-10 04:38	Solomon Islands	-10.320	160.933	34	7.5 M_{w}	T	0	1	1	1	
1988-08-11 16:00	Iran	29.944	51.585	7.8	5.8 M_{w}					1	
1988-08-11 16:04	Iran	29.886	51.655	11	6.0 M_{w}		1	1	1		
1988-08-20 23:09	Nepal (see 1988 Nepal earthquake)	26.763	86.618	57	6.8 M_{w}	Lq	998	998	1450	709	
1988-09-02 07:26	Czech Republic	49.886	18.489	10	3.8 M_{L}		0	3	3		
1988-09-06 00:42	Papua New Guinea	-6.062	146.226	0	4.3 M_{L}	L			74		
1988-11-03 14:47	Guatemala	13.908	-90.501	75.2	6.6 M_{w}	L	5	5	5	5	
1988-11-06 13:03	China (see 1988 Lancang–Gengma earthquakes)	22.909	99.681	6.5	7.0 M_{w}	L	730	730	748		
1988-11-06 13:15	China (see 1988 Lancang–Gengma earthquakes)	23.186	99.411	8.9	6.4 mb						
1988-12-07 07:41	Armenia (see 1988 Armenian earthquake)	40.919	44.118	6.7	6.7 M_{w}		25000	25000	25000	25000	
1989-01-22 23:02	Tajikistan	38.461	68.699	3.4	5.3 mb	L		274	274	274	
1989-02-19 12:27	Japan	36.038	139.860	45.4	5.5 M_{w}		1	1			
1989-03-09 02:37	Malawi	-13.683	34.473	27.4	5.6 M_{w}					9	
1989-03-10 14:14	Papua New Guinea	-4.332	152.842	49.6	5.8 M_{w}	L	0	1	1		
1989-03-10 21:49	Malawi (see 1989 Malawi earthquake)	-13.708	34.485	30	6.3 M_{w}		9	9	9		
1989-04-15 20:34	China	29.955	99.202	13.8	6.4 M_{w}		11	11	8	8	
1989-04-25 14:29	Mexico	16.779	-99.275	19	6.9 M_{w}		3	3	3	3	
1989-05-07 00:38	China	23.538	99.519	25.4	5.6 M_{w}		1	1	1		
1989-05-27 20:08	Iran	30.148	50.892	15	6.0 M_{w}		0	0		100	
1989-06-12 00:04	Bangladesh	21.927	89.872	20	5.8 M_{w}		1	1	1	1	
1989-06-26 03:27	United States Minor Outlying Islands	19.417	-155.149	9	6.4 M_{w}	T,L	0	0		5	
1989-07-21 03:09	China	30.001	99.362	5.9	5.6 M_{w}				3		
1989-08-01 00:18	Indonesia	-4.480	138.983	14	6.1 M_{w}	L	0	120	120	120	
1989-08-03 07:42	Russia	43.536	45.355	35	5.1 M_{w}		1	1	1		
1989-08-08 08:13	United States	37.134	-121.925	15	5.4 M_{L}		1	1	1		
1989-08-20 11:16	Djibouti	11.746	41.960	12	6.5 M_{w}	L	2	2	2		
1989-09-22 02:25	China	31.555	102.422	10.9	6.1 M_{w}		0	0	1	0	
1989-10-18 00:04	United States (see 1989 Loma Prieta earthquake)	37.110	-121.764	16	6.9 M_{w}	T,L	62	62	63	62	
1989-10-18 14:57	China	39.959	113.940	5.6	5.4 M_{w}		29	29	29	29	
1989-10-18 17:01	China	40.014	113.933	4.5	5.6 M_{w}				17		
1989-10-29 19:09	Algeria	36.706	2.441	6	5.9 M_{w}		30	30	35	22	
1989-10-29 19:21	Algeria	36.706	2.437	16.6	5.6 M_{s}						
1989-11-20 03:21	China	29.883	106.826	24.7	5.2 mb		4	4	7	4	
1989-11-20 04:19	Iran	29.898	57.716	14.9	5.9 M_{w}		3	3	3		
1989-12-15 18:43	Philippines	8.365	126.686	24	7.5 M_{w}		1	1	2		
1989-12-27 23:26	Australia (see 1989 Newcastle earthquake)	-33.020	151.602	9.7	5.5 M_{d}		12	12	9		
1990-02-08 07:15	Philippines	9.767	124.631	26	6.7 M_{w}					1	
1990-02-09 17:57	China	31.745	120.982	11.9	5.0 mb		0	0	2		
1990-03-04 19:46	Pakistan	28.906	66.354	8.3	6.0 M_{w}		11	11	11	11	
1990-03-26 22:47	Philippines	9.283	125.564	51.1	5.9 M_{w}		1	1	1		
1990-04-18 13:39	Indonesia	1.195	122.816	26	7.6 M_{w}		3	3	3	5	
1990-04-26 09:37	China (see 1990 Gonghe earthquake)	36.059	100.278	9.3	6.2 M_{w}				119	126	
1990-04-26 09:37	China (see 1990 Gonghe earthquake)	36.059	100.278	9.3	6.4 M_{w}	L	126	126			
1990-05-05 07:21	Italy	40.665	15.851	1.7	5.8 M_{w}					2	
1990-05-05 07:21	Italy	40.712	15.805	9.1	5.8 M_{w}		0	2			
1990-05-30 02:34	Peru	-6.022	-77.197	24	6.5 M_{w}		135	135	135		
1990-05-30 10:40	Romania (see 1990 Vrancea earthquakes)	45.855	26.649	89	6.9 M_{w}		13	14	14	22	
1990-06-09 01:14	Peru	-6.100	-77.133	23.5	5.5 M_{w}		1	1	1		
1990-06-14 07:40	Philippines	11.390	122.045	18.1	7.1 M_{w}		4	4	4	4	
1990-06-14 12:47	Kazakhstan	47.877	85.064	36	6.6 M_{w}		1	1	3	1	
1990-06-17 04:51	Pakistan	27.390	65.665	13.7	6.1 M_{w}		6	6		0	
1990-06-20 21:00	Iran (see 1990 Manjil–Rudbar earthquake)	37.001	49.216	17.9	7.4 M_{w}	L	45000	45000	35000	40000	
1990-06-21 09:02	Iran	36.631	49.785	12.4	5.7 M_{w}		20	20	20		
1990-07-13 14:20	Afghanistan	36.448	70.775	209.8	6.3 M_{w}	L	0	43	43		
1990-07-16 07:26	Philippines (see 1990 Luzon earthquake)	15.721	121.180	24.3	7.7 M_{w}	L,Lq	1621	1621	2430	2412	
1990-08-11 02:59	Ecuador	-0.172	-78.483	18.4	5.3 M_{w}	L	4	4	4	4	
1990-09-26 23:08	South Africa	-28.090	26.837	15	5.0 M_{w}		0	2	2		
1990-10-18 09:30	South Africa	-26.390	27.349	5	4.0 Lg		0	10	10	10	
1990-10-20 08:07	China	37.096	103.718	8	5.7 M_{w}		1	1	2	1	
1990-10-25 04:53	Afghanistan	35.090	70.429	110.2	5.8 M_{w}		11	11	11		
1990-11-06 18:45	Iran	28.242	55.457	11.1	6.6 M_{w}		22	22	22	21	
1990-11-15 02:34	Indonesia	3.939	97.405	30	6.7 M_{w}	L	1	1	7	1	
1990-12-13 00:24	Italy	37.286	15.402	12.1	5.6 M_{w}		19	19	12	19	
1990-12-13 03:01	Taiwan	23.883	121.645	9.4	6.3 M_{w}		2	2	2		
1990-12-21 06:57	Greece	40.977	22.346	13	6.1 M_{w}		1	1	1	1	
1990-12-22 17:27	Costa Rica	9.982	-84.229	11.1	5.9 M_{w}		1	2	1	1	
1991-01-05 14:57	Myanmar	23.559	95.890	16.2	6.9 M_{w}				2	0	
1991-01-31 23:03	Afghanistan	35.944	70.403	142	6.8 M_{w}	L			703	3	
1991-02-13 15:49	France	44.885	6.760	5	3.8 M_{L}	L	0	9	9		
1991-03-25 18:02	China	39.947	113.989	15	5.4 M_{w}		0	0	1		
1991-04-05 04:19	Peru	-5.977	-77.081	20	6.9 M_{w}		53	53	53		
1991-04-18 09:18	Tajikistan	37.464	68.269	10.5	5.5 M_{w}	L			3	24	
1991-04-22 21:56	Costa Rica	9.673	-83.072	12.9	7.6 M_{w}	T,L,Lq	75	75	75	47	
1991-04-24 10:54	Turkey	39.613	41.169	35	4.5 mb		1	1	1		
1991-04-29 09:12	Georgia (see 1991 Racha earthquake)	42.426	43.667	13.4	7.0 M_{w}	L	114	184	184	270	
1991-05-03 20:19	Georgia	42.680	43.245	3.7	5.6 M_{w}	L	0	3	3		
1991-05-04 03:42	Panama	9.547	-82.440	6.9	6.2 M_{w}	Lq	0	0	2	0	
1991-05-26 10:59	Malaysia	5.858	116.652	48.6	5.1 mb		0	1			
1991-06-15 00:59	Georgia	42.406	44.011	6	6.2 M_{w}	L	8	8	8	8	
1991-06-15 11:15	Philippines	15.165	120.316	46.4	5.6 M_{w}		0	137			
1991-06-21 06:27	El Salvador	13.408	-89.633	69.8	5.8 M_{w}	F	0	1	1		
1991-06-28 14:43	United States	34.237	-118.011	11	5.6 M_{w}		1	2	1	2	
1991-07-04 11:43	Indonesia (see 1991 Kalabahi earthquakes)	-8.146	124.587	29	6.7 M_{w}	T	23	23	23	28	
1991-07-12 10:42	Romania	45.393	20.981	15	5.5 M_{w}		2	2	2		
1991-07-23 19:44	Peru	-15.707	-71.721	24.2	5.2 M_{w}	L	12	92	92	11	
1991-07-24 09:45	Iraq	36.598	44.061	20	5.5 M_{w}		20	20	20		
1991-09-18 09:48	Guatemala	14.604	-90.932	10.6	6.2 M_{w}	L	25	25	25	14	
1991-10-19 21:23	India (see 1991 Uttarkashi earthquake)	30.725	78.775	9.3	6.8 M_{w}	L	2000	2000	2000	1500	
1991-11-19 22:28	Colombia	4.552	-77.356	21	7.2 M_{w}		2	2	2	2	
1991-11-22 00:40	Yemen	13.887	44.068	10	4.7 mb		10	10	11	10	
1991-11-28 17:19	Iran	36.826	49.582	18.4	5.6 M_{w}	L	1	1	1		
1992-02-14 17:28	South Africa	-26.420	27.430	5	3.4 Lg		0	4	4		
1992-03-04 11:57	Iran	31.605	50.758	25	5.1 M_{w}	L	6	6	6	5	
1992-03-07 01:53	Costa Rica	10.228	-84.302	79	6.5 M_{w}		0	1			
1992-03-13 17:18	Turkey (see 1992 Erzincan earthquake)	39.727	39.651	7	6.6 M_{w}	L	498		652	653	
1992-04-13 01:20	Netherlands	51.181	5.844	18	5.4 M_{w}		0	1		1	
1992-04-23 15:32	Myanmar	22.407	98.848	7.9	6.1 M_{w}		0	0	4		
1992-05-15 08:08	Uzbekistan	41.001	72.449	37.1	6.2 M_{s}	L	3	3	3	9	
1992-05-20 12:20	Pakistan	33.318	71.272	12.9	6.0 M_{w}		36	36	36	36	
1992-06-28 11:57	United States (see 1992 Landers earthquake)	34.190	-116.520	15	7.3 M_{w}		1	3	1	1	
1992-08-19 02:04	Kyrgyzstan	42.111	73.588	17.1	7.2 M_{w}	L,Lq	61	75	75	54	
1992-08-28 00:50	Pakistan	29.211	66.820	6.4	5.5 M_{w}		4	4	4	4	
1992-09-02 00:16	Nicaragua (see 1992 Nicaragua earthquake)	11.727	-87.380	45	7.6 M_{w}	T		184	184	179	
1992-09-08 00:38	Iran	29.132	52.147	26.8	5.2 mb	L	1	1	1		
1992-09-11 03:57	Democratic Republic of the Congo	-6.151	26.660	11	6.3 M_{w}		8	8	8	9	
1992-10-12 13:09	Egypt (see 1992 Cairo earthquake)	29.714	31.144	22	5.8 M_{w}		552	552	552	552	
1992-10-18 15:11	Colombia (see 1992 Murindó earthquake)	7.093	-76.764	3.5	7.1 M_{w}	L,Lq	1	11	11		
1992-10-22 17:39	Egypt	29.755	31.535	10	4.2 M_{d}		4	4	4		
1992-10-23 09:11	Morocco	31.275	-4.291	25.2	5.5 M_{w}		2	2	2		
1992-10-23 23:19	Georgia	42.561	45.096	16	6.4 M_{w}	L	1	1	1	1	
1992-12-12 05:29	Indonesia (see 1992 Flores earthquake and tsunami and tsunami)	-8.498	121.832	28	7.7 M_{w}	T,L		2519	1740	2500	
1992-12-18 11:21	China	26.328	100.752	21.8	5.0 mb		1	1	1		
1993-01-08 06:57	South Africa	-28.028	26.800	5	2.7 M_{L}		0	6	6		
1993-01-13 17:11	Jamaica	18.052	-76.594	14.2	5.5 M_{w}		1	1	1		
1993-01-15 11:06	Japan (see 1993 Kushiro earthquake)	43.022	144.194	94.8	7.6 M_{w}	L			2	2	
1993-01-15 11:06	Japan	43.024	144.141	102	7.6 M_{w}	L	2	2			
1993-01-31 19:33	China	25.826	101.415	25	4.7 M_{L}		2	2			
1993-02-02 16:05	China	42.200	86.144	32	5.7 mb				4		
1993-03-12 14:01	Wallis and Futuna	-14.409	-178.162	10	6.3 M_{w}		5	5	5	5	
1993-03-20 14:51	China	29.009	87.356	14.1	6.2 M_{w}		2	2			
1993-03-26 11:58	Greece	37.613	21.526	15	5.4 M_{w}		0	0		1	
1993-04-18 09:16	Peru	-11.721	-76.513	106	6.2 M_{w}	L	3	6	6	6	
1993-06-22 16:32	Iran	30.179	50.826	12.6	5.3 M_{w}	L	0	0		24	
1993-07-10 20:40	Costa Rica	9.824	-83.612	16.5	5.8 M_{w}	L	1	2	1	3	
1993-07-12 13:17	Japan (see 1993 Hokkaidō earthquake)	42.892	139.247	17	7.7 M_{w}	T,LF	200	243	230	239	
1993-07-22 04:57	Colombia	6.380	-71.206	20	6.0 M_{w}		2	2	2		
1993-08-01 00:20	Sudan	15.401	31.701	11.8	5.5 M_{w}		2	2	2	3	
1993-09-10 19:12	Mexico	14.758	-92.646	34	7.2 M_{w}	L	1	1	1		
1993-09-21 03:28	United States	42.305	-122.004	11	6.0 M_{w}	L	1	2	1		
1993-09-29 22:25	India (see 1993 Latur earthquake)	18.060	76.478	14.1	6.2 M_{w}		9748	9748	9748	9748	
1993-10-11 15:54	Japan	32.030	137.926	351	6.9 M_{w}		0	1			
1993-10-13 02:06	Papua New Guinea	-5.844	146.131	25	6.9 M_{w}	L		60	60	53	
1993-10-16 03:05	Papua New Guinea	-5.877	146.280	27	6.3 M_{w}		3	3	3		
1993-11-22 22:43	Nicaragua	11.718	-86.084	112.6	5.9 M_{w}		0	1			
1993-11-30 20:37	China	39.326	75.505	12.7	5.6 M_{w}		0	0	2		
1994-01-17 12:30	United States (see 1994 Northridge earthquake)	34.164	-118.563	19	6.7 M_{w}	L,Lq	60	60	60		33
1994-01-21 02:24	Indonesia	1.043	127.773	20	6.9 M_{w}		7	7	7	7	
1994-02-05 23:34	Uganda	0.558	30.081	14	6.2 M_{w}	L	2	4	8	7	
1994-02-15 17:07	Indonesia	-4.999	104.255	23	6.8 M_{w}	L		207	207	207	
1994-02-23 08:02	Iran	30.788	60.532	7	6.1 M_{w}		6	6	6	9	
1994-03-01 03:49	Iran	29.143	52.638	12.9	6.0 M_{w}	L	2	2	2	3	
1994-03-02 03:38	Haiti	19.941	-72.814	6.7	5.4 M_{w}		4	4	4		
1994-05-01 12:00	Afghanistan	36.934	67.124	17.5	6.1 M_{w}					160	
1994-05-26 08:26	Morocco	35.250	-4.089	10	5.9 M_{w}		0	0	2		
1994-06-02 18:17	Indonesia (see 1994 Java earthquake)	-10.409	112.934	34.5	7.8 M_{w}	T		277	277		
1994-06-05 01:09	Taiwan	24.455	121.850	11	6.3 M_{w}	T,L	1	1	1		
1994-06-06 20:47	Colombia (see 1994 Páez River earthquake)	2.908	-75.971	12	6.8 M_{w}	L	295	795	800		
1994-06-09 00:33	Bolivia (see 1994 Bolivia earthquake)	-13.860	-67.512	631	8.2 M_{w}	L	1	5	10	0	
1994-06-20 09:09	Iran	29.053	52.671	10.8	5.9 M_{w}	L	3	3	3	2	
1994-07-04 21:36	Mexico	14.887	-97.312	15	6.4 M_{w}		2	2	2		
1994-08-18 01:13	Algeria (see 1994 Mascara earthquake)	35.464	-0.084	9	5.8 M_{w}		159	159	159	171	
1994-09-01 07:11	South Africa	-26.447	27.405	5	2.7 M_{L}		0	3			
1994-09-16 06:20	Taiwan (see 1994 Taiwan Strait earthquake)	22.555	118.719	13	6.7 M_{w}		1	1	5	1	
1994-10-04 13:22	Russia (see 1994 Kuril Islands earthquake)	43.863	147.353	14	8.3 M_{w}	T,L		11	11	5	
1994-10-08 21:44	Indonesia	-1.206	127.980	17	6.8 M_{w}	T	1	1	1	1	
1994-11-14 19:15	Philippines	13.543	121.059	32	7.1 M_{w}	T,Lq	78	78	78	81	
1994-12-28 12:19	Japan	40.523	143.430	27	7.7 M_{w}	T	3	3	3	2	
1995-01-16 20:46	Japan (see Great Hanshin earthquake)	34.580	135.025	22	6.9 M_{w}	L,F,Lq	5502	5530	6432	5297	
1995-01-19 15:05	Colombia	5.044	-72.936	17	6.5 M_{w}	L	7	7	7	7	
1995-02-03 15:26	United States	41.488	-109.785	1	5.3 mb		0	1	1		
1995-02-08 18:40	Colombia	4.052	-76.589	74	6.3 M_{w}	L	42	42	42	40	
1995-02-23 05:19	Taiwan	24.233	121.706	43.6	6.2 M_{w}	L	0	2	2		
1995-02-23 21:03	Cyprus	35.060	32.269	18	5.9 M_{w}		2	2		2	
1995-03-04 23:23	Colombia	1.282	-77.307	5	4.4 mb		8	8	8	8	
1995-03-26 15:12	Ecuador	-2.133	-79.509	95.5	5.6 M_{w}					1	
1995-05-13 08:47	Greece	40.144	21.718	14	6.6 M_{w}		0	0		26	
1995-05-14 11:33	Indonesia	-8.462	125.039	11	6.9 M_{w}	T,L	0	11	11		
1995-05-21 06:13	Indonesia	-8.288	122.944	26.4	5.2 M_{w}		1	1	1		
1995-05-27 13:03	Russia (see 1995 Neftegorsk earthquake)	52.604	142.823	11	7.0 M_{w}		1989	1989	1989	1989	
1995-06-15 00:15	Greece	38.444	22.309	14	6.2 M_{w}		26	26	26	26	
1995-06-25 06:59	Taiwan	24.620	121.679	60.3	5.9 M_{w}	L	0	1	1		
1995-07-11 21:46	Myanmar	21.948	99.103	9.2	6.8 M_{w}		11	11	11	11	
1995-07-21 22:44	China	36.436	103.166	7.4	5.6 M_{w}		14	14	14	14	
1995-07-30 05:11	Chile (see 1995 Antofagasta earthquake)	-23.340	-70.253	46	8.0 M_{w}	T,L	3	3	3	3	
1995-09-14 14:04	Mexico	16.849	-98.608	23	7.3 M_{w}		3	3	3	6	
1995-10-01 15:57	Turkey	38.077	30.143	31	6.4 M_{w}		101	101	101	94	
1995-10-03 01:51	Ecuador	-2.790	-77.823	24	7.0 M_{w}		2	2	2	2	
1995-10-06 18:09	Indonesia	-2.007	101.450	36.6	6.7 M_{w}	L	84	84	84	84	
1995-10-09 15:35	Mexico (see 1995 Colima–Jalisco earthquake)	19.053	-104.208	26.4	8.0 M_{w}	T,L	49	49	58		
1995-10-23 22:46	China	25.947	102.220	14.7	6.2 M_{w}		81	81	53	46	
1995-11-22 04:15	Saudi Arabia/Egypt (see 1995 Gulf of Aqaba earthquake)	28.762	34.808	14	7.2 M_{w}	Lq	9	10	10	10	
1995-12-19 20:56	Guatemala	15.175	-90.171	15	5.3 M_{w}	L	0	1	1		
1995-12-19 23:28	Indonesia	-3.665	140.263	63	6.4 M_{w}		0	2	2		
1996-01-01 08:05	Indonesia (see 1996 Sulawesi earthquake)	0.714	119.905	24	7.9 M_{w}	T	8	9	10	9	
1996-02-03 11:14	China (see 1996 Lijiang earthquake)	27.271	100.262	12.2	6.6 M_{w}		322	322	309	309	
1996-02-17 05:59	Indonesia (see 1996 Biak earthquake)	-0.918	136.973	35.8	8.2 M_{w}	T	108	166	166	166	
1996-02-21 12:51	Peru (see 1996 Chimbote earthquake)	-9.722	-79.868	15	7.5 M_{w}	T	0	7			
1996-03-19 15:00	China	40.043	76.621	18.9	6.3 M_{w}		24	24	24	26	
1996-03-28 23:03	Ecuador	-1.031	-78.659	9	5.9 M_{w}	L	27	27		27	
1996-04-29 14:40	Papua New Guinea	-6.518	155.116	38	7.2 M_{w}		1	1	1		
1996-05-03 03:32	China	40.777	109.713	24.5	6.0 M_{w}		18	18	26	18	
1996-08-14 01:55	Turkey	40.697	35.293	25.8	5.7 M_{w}	L	0	0	1	0	
1996-09-24 19:24	China	27.212	100.332	8.2	5.5 M_{w}				1	0	
1996-10-09 13:10	Cyprus	34.562	32.143	22	6.8 M_{w}		1	2	2		
1996-11-12 16:59	Peru	-14.959	-75.562	21	7.7 M_{w}	T	14	14	15	14	
1997-01-11 20:28	Mexico	18.193	-102.795	35	7.1 M_{w}		1	1	1	1	
1997-01-21 01:48	China (see 1997 Jiashi earthquakes)	39.536	76.879	15	5.9 M_{w}		12	12	12	12	
1997-01-22 17:57	Turkey	36.199	35.902	46.1	5.7 M_{w}		0	0	1		
1997-02-04 10:37	Iran	37.724	57.305	15	6.5 M_{w}		100	100	100	100	
1997-02-27 21:08	Pakistan (see 1997 Harnai earthquake)	29.979	68.165	34.9	7.1 M_{w}	L	60	60	57	50	
1997-02-28 12:57	Iran (see 1997 Ardabil earthquake)	38.108	48.069	9.7	6.1 M_{w}		1100	1100	1100	1100	
1997-03-01 06:04	China	39.450	76.817	19.3	5.6 M_{w}		2	2	1	2	
1997-03-19 19:57	Pakistan	34.790	71.523	15	4.9 mb		15	15	15		
1997-04-05 23:46	China	39.525	76.830	15	5.9 M_{w}		0	0		9	
1997-04-11 05:34	China	39.536	76.892	20	6.1 M_{w}		9	9	9	9	
1997-05-10 07:57	Iran (see 1997 Qayen earthquake)	33.848	59.810	12.6	7.2 M_{w}	L	1572	1572	1572	1568	
1997-05-13 11:42	Iran	33.399	59.880	11.6	4.5 mb		1	1	1		
1997-05-13 14:13	Afghanistan	36.467	70.968	196	6.4 M_{w}		1	1			
1997-05-21 22:51	India (see 1997 Jabalpur earthquake)	23.072	80.083	36	5.8 M_{w}		38	38	38	43	
1997-05-21 23:50	Spain	42.830	-7.231	17.1	5.3 M_{w}		0	1			
1997-07-09 19:24	Venezuela (see 1997 Cariaco earthquake)	10.450	-63.532	10	6.9 M_{w}	L	81	81	81	80	
1997-07-21 08:45	South Africa	-26.857	26.619	5	5.0 mb		0	15	15	15	
1997-09-26 09:40	Italy (see 1997 Umbria and Marche earthquake)	43.078	12.781	6	6.0 M_{w}		11	11	11	14	
1997-09-28 01:38	Indonesia	-3.773	119.658	13	5.8 M_{w}		18	18	17	20	
1997-10-15 01:03	Chile (see 1997 Punitaqui earthquake)	-30.878	-71.167	58	7.1 M_{w}	L	7	8	8	8	
1997-11-06 02:34	Canada	46.771	-71.387	22.5	5.1 Lg		0	1	1		
1997-11-21 11:23	India (see 1997 Chittagong earthquake)	22.260	92.715	54	6.1 M_{w}		23	23	23	23	
1998-01-10 03:50	China	41.137	114.523	5	5.7 M_{w}	F	70	70	49	49	
1998-01-30 12:16	Chile	-23.850	-70.147	42	7.0 M_{w}		0	1			
1998-02-04 14:33	Afghanistan (see February 1998 Afghanistan earthquake)	37.080	70.004	17.6	5.9 M_{w}	L	2323	2323	2323	2323	
1998-02-20 12:18	Afghanistan	36.479	71.074	236	6.3 M_{w}	L	1	1	1	1	
1998-03-14 19:40	Iran	30.126	57.585	13.8	6.6 M_{w}		5	5	5	5	
1998-03-26 16:26	Italy	43.224	12.919	10	5.4 M_{w}		0	1			
1998-04-10 15:00	Iran	32.447	60.063	7	5.7 M_{w}		12	12	12		
1998-04-12 10:55	Slovenia	46.271	13.653	7.5	5.6 M_{w}	L	0	1		0	
1998-05-22 04:48	Bolivia	-17.783	-65.401	24	6.6 M_{w}		105	105	105	95	
1998-05-30 06:22	Afghanistan (see May 1998 Afghanistan earthquake)	37.185	70.075	35.5	6.5 M_{w}	L	4000	4000	4000	4700	
1998-06-27 13:55	Turkey (see 1998 Adana–Ceyhan earthquake)	36.903	35.325	16	6.3 M_{w}		145	145	145		
1998-07-09 05:19	Portugal	38.621	-28.566	9	6.1 M_{w}		10	10	10	10	
1998-07-09 14:19	Azerbaijan	38.726	48.525	29	5.9 M_{w}					1	
1998-07-17 04:51	Taiwan	23.503	120.711	11	5.7 M_{w}	L	5	5	5		
1998-07-17 08:49	Papua New Guinea (see 1998 Papua New Guinea earthquake)	-2.946	142.520	23	7.0 M_{w}	T	0	2683	2700		
1998-07-29 07:14	Chile	-32.327	-71.244	51	6.4 M_{w}	L	0	2			
1998-08-04 18:59	Ecuador (see 1998 Bahía de Caráquez earthquake)	-0.594	-80.313	20	7.1 M_{w}	L	3	3	3	3	
1998-08-27 09:03	China	39.572	77.298	28	6.3 M_{w}		3	3	3		
1998-09-09 11:27	Italy	40.000	15.975	10	5.6 M_{w}		1	2	1		
1998-09-28 13:34	Indonesia	-8.177	112.340	151.6	6.5 M_{w}		1	1	1		
1998-11-13 13:01	Iran	27.791	53.642	12.5	5.4 M_{w}	L	5	5	5	5	
1998-11-19 11:38	China	27.263	100.955	4.8	5.6 M_{w}	L	5	5	6	3	
1998-11-29 14:10	Indonesia	-1.939	124.818	16	7.7 M_{w}		41	41	41		
1998-12-11 20:16	Afghanistan	36.518	71.000	219	5.6 M_{w}		5	5	5		
1999-01-25 18:19	Colombia (see 1999 Colombia earthquake)	4.444	-75.659	17	6.1 M_{w}	L	1185	1885	1900	1186	
1999-02-11 14:08	Afghanistan	34.323	69.165	25.5	6.0 M_{w}		70	70	70	70	
1999-02-21 18:14	Russia	43.262	46.909	41.9	5.3 M_{w}		1	1	1	1	
1999-03-04 05:38	Iran	28.271	57.207	27.7	6.6 M_{w}		1	1	1	1	
1999-03-28 19:05	India (see 1999 Chamoli earthquake)	30.475	79.401	10.7	6.5 M_{w}	L	100	100	100	100	
1999-04-03 06:17	Peru	-16.602	-72.518	85	6.8 M_{w}	L	1	1	1		
1999-04-22 22:19	South Africa	-27.953	26.679	6.5	5.7 mb		0	2	2		
1999-05-06 23:00	Iran	29.519	51.907	16.3	6.2 M_{w}		26	26	26	20	
1999-06-04 09:12	Azerbaijan	40.767	47.483	14	5.4 M_{w}		0	0		1	
1999-06-15 20:42	Mexico (see 1999 Tehuacán earthquake)	18.381	-97.445	63	6.9 M_{w}	L	16	20	17	15	
1999-07-11 14:14	Guatemala	15.791	-88.285	15	6.7 M_{w}		1	2	1		
1999-07-22 10:42	Bangladesh	21.658	91.933	25	5.2 mb		6	6	6	6	
1999-08-10 19:33	Iran	36.157	54.648	20	4.5 mb		1	1	1		
1999-08-17 00:01	Turkey (see 1999 İzmit earthquake)	40.773	30.003	13.3	7.6 M_{w}		17118		17118	17127	45000
1999-08-31 08:10	Turkey	40.767	29.912	8.4	5.1 M_{w}		1	1	1	1	
1999-09-07 11:56	Greece (see 1999 Athens earthquake)	38.119	23.598	10	6.0 M_{w}		143	143	143	143	
1999-09-13 11:55	Turkey	40.736	30.089	13	5.8 M_{w}		6	7	6	6	
1999-09-20 17:47	Taiwan (see 1999 Jiji earthquake)	23.819	120.877	21	7.7 M_{w}	L	2297	2297	2413	2264	2489
1999-09-25 23:52	Taiwan	23.813	121.087	17	6.5 M_{w}	L			5		
1999-09-29 00:13	Turkey	40.736	29.350	7.6	5.2 M_{w}		1	1	1		
1999-09-30 16:31	Mexico (see 1999 Oaxaca earthquake)	16.055	-96.905	40	7.4 M_{w}	L	15	15	35	31	
1999-10-22 02:18	Taiwan	23.531	120.443	14	5.8 M_{w}		1	1	1	1	
1999-11-07 16:54	Turkey	40.695	30.724	16	4.9 M_{w}		0	1			
1999-11-11 14:41	Turkey	40.740	30.247	10	5.6 M_{w}		1	2	1	3	
1999-11-12 16:57	Turkey (see 1999 Düzce earthquake)	40.803	31.219	12.8	7.2 M_{w}	L	894	894	894	845	
1999-11-24 16:40	China	24.586	102.845	15	5.0 M_{L}		1	1	1		
1999-11-26 13:21	Vanuatu	-16.316	168.239	33	7.4 M_{w}	T,L		10	10	12	
1999-12-03 17:06	Turkey	40.482	42.354	6.4	5.7 M_{w}	L	1	1	1		
1999-12-11 18:03	Philippines	15.779	119.776	40	7.2 M_{w}		1	5	1	6	
1999-12-15 05:12	Philippines	11.296	124.516	16.2	4.8 mb		1	1			
1999-12-21 14:14	Indonesia	-6.823	105.498	42	6.4 M_{w}		5	5	5	5	
1999-12-22 17:36	Algeria	35.210	-1.316	2.3	5.6 M_{w}		24	24	24	22	
2000-01-14 22:09	China (see 2000 Yunnan earthquake)	25.549	101.118	13.6	5.5 M_{w}					7	
2000-01-14 23:37	China (see 2000 Yunnan earthquake)	25.567	101.071	24.9	5.9 M_{w}		7	7	7		
2000-01-26 20:55	China	24.148	103.654	35	4.9 mb		0	0		1	
2000-02-02 22:58	Iran	35.238	58.213	22.7	5.3 M_{w}		1	1	1	1	
2000-05-04 04:21	Indonesia	-1.140	123.522	26	7.5 M_{w}	T	46	46	46	45	
2000-05-07 23:10	Turkey	38.164	38.777	5	4.5 M_{d}		0	0		1	
2000-05-12 18:43	Argentina	-23.754	-66.777	225	7.2 M_{w}		0	1	1		
2000-05-17 03:25	Taiwan	24.167	121.078	15	5.4 M_{w}	L	3	3	3		
2000-06-04 16:28	Indonesia	-4.760	102.031	33.8	7.9 M_{w}	L	103	103	103	103	
2000-06-05 23:55	Indonesia	-4.151	101.953	47	5.5 M_{w}					1	
2000-06-06 02:41	Turkey	40.737	33.005	7	6.0 M_{w}		2	2	2	2	
2000-06-07 23:45	Indonesia	-4.651	101.848	32	6.7 M_{w}		1	1	1		
2000-06-10 18:23	Taiwan	23.868	121.181	19	6.4 M_{w}	L	0	2			
2000-07-01 07:01	Japan	34.222	139.171	12.5	6.1 M_{w}	T,L	0	1	1	1	
2000-07-06 19:30	Nicaragua	11.928	-86.066	15	5.4 M_{w}		7	7	7	7	
2000-07-07 00:15	Turkey	40.857	29.344	7.8	4.2 M_{d}		0	1			
2000-07-17 22:53	Afghanistan	36.245	70.943	135	6.3 M_{w}		2	2	2		
2000-08-21 13:25	China	25.726	102.240	5.4	4.9 mb		1	1	1	1	
2000-09-20 08:37	Ecuador	-1.946	-80.522	40	5.5 M_{w}		1	1	1		
2000-10-02 02:25	Tanzania	-7.965	30.806	34	6.4 M_{w}		0	0		1	
2000-11-08 06:59	Colombia	7.091	-77.811	17	6.5 M_{w}		0	0		2	
2000-11-10 20:10	Algeria	36.437	4.838	7	5.7 M_{w}		2	2	2		
2000-11-16 04:54	Papua New Guinea	-3.996	152.268	27.6	8.0 M_{w}	T,L	1	2	2	1	
2000-11-25 18:09	Azerbaijan (see 2000 Baku earthquake)	40.198	49.929	51.6	6.8 M_{w}		5	31	5	31	
2000-11-25 18:10	Azerbaijan	40.161	49.912	52.9	6.5 M_{w}						
2000-12-06 17:11	Turkmenistan	39.532	54.801	30.6	7.0 M_{w}		11	11	11	11	
2000-12-15 16:44	Turkey	38.451	31.265	12	6.0 M_{w}		6	6	6		
2001-01-13 17:33	El Salvador (see January 2001 El Salvador earthquake)	13.076	-88.702	38	7.6 M_{w}	L	267	852	852	844	
2001-01-26 03:16	India (see 2001 Gujarat earthquake)	23.402	70.287	23.3	7.6 M_{w}		20023	20023	20023	20005	
2001-02-13 14:22	El Salvador (see February 2001 El Salvador earthquake)	13.600	-89.001	11	6.6 M_{w}	L	315	315	315	315	
2001-02-17 20:25	El Salvador (San Salvador)	13.787	-89.106	10	5.1 mb	L	1	1	1		
2001-02-23 00:09	China	29.459	101.079	7	5.6 M_{w}		3	3	3	3	
2001-02-28 18:54	United States (see 2001 Nisqually earthquake)	47.090	-122.581	54	6.8 M_{w}	L,Lq	0	0		1	
2001-03-24 06:27	Japan	34.108	132.540	42	6.8 M_{w}		2	2	2	2	
2001-04-12 10:47	China	24.806	99.051	10.1	5.6 M_{w}	L	2	2	2	2	
2001-05-23 21:10	China	27.619	100.901	2.1	5.4 M_{w}		2	2	2	2	
2001-06-01 14:00	Afghanistan	35.105	69.324	44.5	5.0 M_{w}		4	4	4	4	
2001-06-21 19:55	France	49.147	6.870	1	4.2 M_{L}		0	1	1		
2001-06-23 20:33	Peru (see 2001 southern Peru earthquake)	-16.385	-73.505	33.7	8.4 M_{w}	T,L	48	138	139	145	
2001-07-07 09:38	Peru	-17.532	-71.931	14.1	7.6 M_{w}	L	1	1	1		
2001-07-17 15:06	Italy	46.723	11.234	5.7	4.7 M_{w}	L	0	4	3		
2001-07-24 05:00	Chile	-19.558	-69.234	13.4	6.3 M_{w}		1	1	1		
2001-08-09 02:06	Peru	-14.348	-72.680	9.6	5.8 M_{w}		4	4	4	4	
2001-10-27 05:35	China	26.289	100.586	5.8	5.5 M_{w}		1	1	1	1	
2001-12-04 05:57	Peru	-15.353	-72.435	41.4	5.8 M_{w}		2	2	2		
2002-01-09 06:45	Tajikistan	38.644	69.844	28.6	5.2 M_{w}		3	3	3	3	
2002-01-10 11:14	Papua New Guinea	-3.264	142.447	11	6.7 M_{w}		1	1	1	1	
2002-01-21 04:39	Democratic Republic of the Congo	-1.770	28.996	11.6	5.1 M_{w}					45	
2002-01-21 14:34	Turkey	38.633	27.887	27.5	4.8 M_{L}		1	1			
2002-01-22 04:53	Greece	35.624	26.645	88	6.2 M_{w}		0	1			
2002-02-03 07:11	Turkey	38.527	31.227	5	6.5 M_{w}		44	44	44	42	
2002-02-17 13:03	Iran	28.089	51.792	16.4	5.3 M_{w}		1	1	1	1	
2002-03-03 12:08	Afghanistan (see 2002 Hindu Kush earthquakes)	36.508	70.503	204	7.3 M_{w}	L	16	166	166	150	
2002-03-05 21:16	Philippines	6.028	124.218	31	7.5 M_{w}	T,L	15	15	15	15	
2002-03-25 14:56	Afghanistan (see 2002 Hindu Kush earthquakes)	36.051	69.210	10.5	6.1 M_{w}	L	1000	1000	1000	1000	
2002-03-27 08:52	Afghanistan	36.053	69.248	9.1	5.6 M_{w}	L					
2002-03-31 06:52	Taiwan	24.300	122.142	34	7.1 M_{w}	T,L	5	5	5	4	
2002-04-01 06:14	Papua New Guinea	-6.231	147.545	81.4	5.3 M_{w}	L	0	36	36		
2002-04-12 04:00	Afghanistan	35.988	69.296	7.8	5.8 M_{w}	L	50	50	50	50	
2002-04-22 04:57	Peru	-12.428	-76.578	64.9	4.4 mb		0	1			
2002-04-24 10:51	Serbia	42.420	21.533	8	5.7 M_{w}		1	1	1	1	
2002-04-24 19:48	Iran	34.602	47.401	25	5.4 M_{w}		2	2	2	2	
2002-04-25 17:41	Georgia	41.767	44.857	34.8	4.8 mb	L	5	5	5	6	
2002-05-15 03:46	Taiwan	24.668	121.868	16.7	6.1 M_{w}	L	1	1	1		
2002-05-18 15:15	Tanzania	-2.919	33.738	9.8	5.5 M_{w}		2	2	2	2	
2002-06-22 02:58	Iran	35.597	49.020	11	6.5 M_{w}		261	261	227	227	
2002-09-06 01:21	Italy	38.335	13.728	13	5.9 M_{w}		0	2			
2002-09-08 18:44	Papua New Guinea	-3.262	142.940	13	7.6 M_{w}	T,L	4	4	4	4	
2002-09-13 22:28	India	13.013	93.093	15	6.5 M_{w}	T	2	2	2	2	
2002-10-10 10:50	Indonesia	-1.700	134.230	16	7.5 M_{w}	T,L,Lq	8	8	8	8	
2002-10-24 06:08	Democratic Republic of the Congo	-1.962	29.013	11	6.2 M_{w}		2	2	2		
2002-10-31 10:33	Italy (see 2002 Molise earthquakes)	41.738	14.852	5.7	5.7 M_{w}	L	29	29	29	30	
2002-11-01 22:09	Pakistan	35.393	74.627	27.5	5.3 M_{w}	L	11	11		17	
2002-11-02 01:26	Indonesia	2.837	96.088	30	7.2 M_{w}		3	3	3	3	
2002-11-03 07:33	Pakistan	35.348	74.595	15.7	5.3 M_{w}						
2002-11-20 21:32	Pakistan	35.337	74.556	14.8	6.3 M_{w}	L	19	19	19	19	
2002-12-14 13:27	China	39.754	97.391	5	5.5 M_{w}		2	2	2	2	
2003-01-21 02:46	Guatemala	13.623	-90.850	24	6.4 M_{w}		0	1			
2003-01-22 02:06	Mexico (see 2003 Colima earthquake)	18.900	-104.063	24	7.5 M_{w}	T,L	29	29		29	
2003-01-27 05:26	Turkey	39.503	39.851	16.1	6.0 M_{w}		1	1	1	1	
2003-02-24 02:03	China (see 2003 Bachu earthquake)	39.515	77.204	14	6.3 M_{w}		261	261		268	
2003-02-25 03:52	China (see 2003 Bachu earthquake)	39.402	77.358	18.7	5.3 M_{w}		5	5	5		
2003-03-25 02:53	Indonesia	-8.339	120.606	34	6.4 M_{w}		0	4	4		
2003-03-29 11:46	Afghanistan	35.907	70.550	110	5.8 M_{w}		1	1	1		
2003-05-01 00:27	Turkey (see 2003 Bingöl earthquake)	38.970	40.458	14	6.3 M_{w}	L	177	177		177	
2003-05-04 15:44	China	39.305	77.142	10	5.8 M_{w}		0	1		1	
2003-05-21 18:44	Algeria (see 2003 Boumerdès earthquake)	36.880	3.694	12	6.8 M_{w}	T,L,Lq	2266	2266		2266	
2003-05-22 18:11	Kazakhstan	42.954	72.763	35	5.5 M_{w}					3	
2003-05-26 19:23	Indonesia	2.349	128.879	31	6.9 M_{w}		1	1	1	1	
2003-05-27 17:11	Algeria	36.865	3.592	8	5.7 M_{w}	T	9	9		9	
2003-06-24 13:01	Iran	33.024	49.463	15	4.6 mb	L	1	1	1		
2003-07-10 17:06	Iran	28.311	54.165	8	5.7 M_{w}		1	1	1	1	
2003-07-21 15:16	China	25.958	101.260	35	5.9 M_{w}	L	16	16	16	16	
2003-07-26 23:18	Bangladesh	22.868	92.317	35	5.6 M_{w}	L	2	2	2	2	
2003-07-27 07:32	Bangladesh	22.743	92.168	10	4.3 mb						
2003-07-27 12:07	Bangladesh	22.836	92.316	35	5.4 M_{w}						
2003-08-16 10:58	China	43.779	119.718	23.3	5.4 M_{w}		4	4	4	4	
2003-09-21 18:16	Myanmar (see 2003 Taungdwingyi earthquake)	19.917	95.672	10	6.6 M_{wb}			10			
2003-09-22 04:45	Dominican Republic	19.766	-70.693	14	6.4 M_{w}	L	1	3	1	3	
2003-09-25 19:50	Japan	41.864	143.878	27	8.3 M_{w}	T,LF	0	0		2	
2003-09-27 11:33	Russia	50.031	87.817	12.3	7.3 M_{w}	L	0	3		3	
2003-10-16 12:28	China	25.882	101.256	35	5.6 M_{w}		3	3	3	3	
2003-10-25 12:41	China	38.386	100.978	12	5.8 M_{w}		9	9	9	9	
2003-10-25 12:47	China	38.371	100.994	13.5	5.8 M_{w}						
2003-11-13 02:35	China	34.713	103.865	35	5.1 M_{w}		1	1	1	1	
2003-11-14 18:49	China	27.462	103.974	35	5.6 M_{w}		4	4	4	4	
2003-11-18 17:14	Philippines	12.113	125.416	35	6.5 M_{w}	L	1	1	1		
2003-12-01 01:38	Kazakhstan	42.885	80.546	17	6.0 M_{w}		11	11	11	11	
2003-12-22 19:15	United States (see 2003 San Simeon earthquake)	35.629	-121.075	16	6.6 M_{w}	L,Lq	2	2	2	2	
2003-12-25 07:11	Panama	8.369	-82.842	34	6.5 M_{w}		2	2	2	2	
2003-12-26 01:56	Iran (see 2003 Bam earthquake)	28.950	58.268	6	6.6 M_{w}	L	31000	31000		26796	26271 26000
2004-01-01 20:59	Indonesia	-8.349	115.758	45.4	5.8 M_{w}		1	1		1	
2004-02-05 21:05	Indonesia	-3.661	135.597	23	7.0 M_{w}	F	37	37		37	
2004-02-14 10:30	Pakistan	34.751	73.178	11	5.4 M_{w}	L	10	24		24	
2004-02-14 11:56	Pakistan	34.772	73.169	11	5.3 M_{w}						
2004-02-16 14:44	Indonesia	-0.516	100.548	12.7	5.0 M_{w}		5	5		5	
2004-02-24 02:14	Burundi	-3.360	29.446	15.7	4.7 mb		3	3		3	
2004-02-24 02:27	Morocco (see 2004 Al Hoceima earthquake)	35.184	-3.985	8	6.3 M_{w}	L	631	631		628	
2004-02-25 12:44	Morocco	35.225	-4.080	7.2	5.2 M_{w}						
2004-02-26 12:07	Morocco	35.246	-4.178	18.3	4.9 M_{w}						
2004-03-01 23:55	Turkey	38.058	38.277	5	3.8 M_{d}		6	6			
2004-03-07 06:37	Morocco	35.174	-4.161	34.6	5.1 M_{w}						
2004-03-25 19:30	Turkey	39.804	40.721	56.3	5.6 M_{w}		10	10		9	
2004-04-05 21:24	Afghanistan	36.480	71.042	175	6.5 M_{w}		3	3			
2004-05-01 07:56	Taiwan	24.058	121.600	27.3	5.2 M_{w}	L	0	2			
2004-05-08 20:11	Pakistan	30.167	67.068	35	4.5 mb		1	1			
2004-05-28 12:38	Iran	36.257	51.565	26.7	6.3 M_{w}	L		35		35	
2004-07-01 22:30	Turkey	39.735	43.908	27.1	5.1 M_{w}		18	18		18	
2004-07-12 13:04	Slovenia	46.305	13.628	7.3	5.2 M_{w}	L	0	1		1	
2004-07-18 04:22	New Zealand	-38.013	176.432	2.4	5.4 M_{w}	L	1	1			
2004-07-18 08:31	Afghanistan	33.344	69.479	5.7	5.2 M_{w}		2	2		2	
2004-07-30 07:14	Turkey	39.690	43.935	20	4.8 mb		1	1			
2004-08-10 10:26	China	27.318	103.917	13.2	5.3 M_{w}		4	4		4	
2004-08-11 15:48	Turkey	38.347	39.232	4.5	5.6 M_{w}		1	1			
2004-09-07 11:53	Argentina	-28.568	-65.850	13	6.1 M_{w}		1	1			
2004-09-15 08:35	Indonesia	-8.784	115.325	96.7	5.3 M_{w}		1	1			
2004-10-23 08:56	Japan (see 2004 Chūetsu earthquake)	37.230	138.801	16	6.6 M_{w}	L,F	40	40		40	68
2004-11-11 21:26	Indonesia	-8.166	124.764	13	7.5 M_{w}	L	34	34		33	
2004-11-20 08:07	Costa Rica	9.623	-84.165	16	6.4 M_{w}	L	8	8		8	
2004-11-21 11:41	Guadeloupe	15.679	-61.724	14	6.3 M_{w}		1	1		1	
2004-11-26 02:25	Indonesia	-3.615	135.450	24	7.1 M_{w}	F	32	32		32	
2004-12-01 23:17	Indonesia	-3.689	135.604	7.2	5.5 M_{w}		1	1			
2004-12-26 00:58	Indonesia (see 2004 Indian Ocean earthquake)	3.287	95.972	30	9.1 M_{w}	T,L		297200			231000* 283000* 227898*
2005-01-23 20:10	Indonesia	-1.196	119.910	38.1	6.2 M_{w}		1	1		1	
2005-01-25 16:44	Turkey	37.603	43.691	40.6	5.9 M_{w}		2	2			
2005-02-02 05:55	Indonesia	-7.004	107.816	57.2	4.8 mb		1	1			
2005-02-05 12:23	Philippines	5.321	123.338	522.1	7.1 M_{w}		2	2			
2005-02-22 02:25	Iran (see 2005 Zarand earthquake)	30.691	56.794	7	6.4 M_{w}		612	612		612	
2005-03-09 10:15	South Africa	-26.889	26.775	13	5.0 mb		2	2		2	
2005-03-20 01:53	Japan (see 2005 Fukuoka earthquake)	33.802	130.209	10.7	6.6 M_{w}	L	1	1		1	
2005-03-28 16:09	Indonesia (see 2005 Nias–Simeulue earthquake)	2.069	97.097	22	8.6 M_{w}	T	1303	1313		915	
2005-05-03 07:21	Iran	33.655	48.669	27.1	4.9 M_{w}		4	4			
2005-06-04 14:50	Papua New Guinea	-6.355	146.846	44	6.1 M_{w}		1	1		1	
2005-06-13 22:44	Chile	-20.007	-69.198	105.2	7.8 M_{w}	L	5	11		11	
2005-07-05 16:53	South Africa	-26.468	27.435	5	2.7 M_{L}		0	1			
2005-07-25 15:43	China	46.884	125.030	43.3	5.0 M_{w}		1	1			
2005-09-26 01:55	Peru (see 2005 Northern Peru earthquake)	-5.721	-76.414	120.9	7.5 M_{w}		5	5		5	
2005-10-08 03:50	Pakistan (see 2005 Kashmir earthquake)	34.465	73.584	23.1	7.6 M_{w}	L,Lq	87351	87351		73338	
2005-10-15 04:24	Pakistan	33.977	73.929	11.6	5.2 mb		2	2			
2005-10-20 21:40	Turkey	38.158	26.753	7.7	5.8 M_{w}		0	1			
2005-10-27 11:18	China	23.604	107.798	10	4.2 mb		1	1			
2005-11-08 07:54	Vietnam	9.973	108.226	14.7	5.3 M_{w}		1	1			
2005-11-26 00:49	China (see 2005 Ruichang earthquake)	29.714	115.663	10.5	5.2 M_{w}		16	16			
2005-11-27 10:22	Iran, 2005 Qeshm earthquake	26.786	55.833	18.4	5.9 M_{w}		13	13		13	
2005-12-05 12:19	Tanzania (see 2005 Lake Tanganyika earthquake)	-6.246	29.789	20	6.8 M_{w}		6	6		6	
2005-12-12 21:47	Afghanistan (see 2005 Hindu Kush earthquake)	36.285	71.120	223.8	6.5 M_{w}		5	5		5	
2005-12-14 07:09	India	30.460	79.201	35.5	5.1 M_{w}	L	1	1			
2006-02-14 00:55	India	27.382	88.388	30	5.3 M_{w}	L	0	2			
2006-02-22 22:19	Mozambique	-21.324	33.583	11	7.0 M_{w}		4	4			
2006-03-10 07:50	Pakistan	33.129	73.887	10	4.9 M_{w}		1	1			
2006-03-14 06:57	Indonesia	-3.595	127.214	30	6.7 M_{w}	T,L	0	4		4	
2006-03-20 19:44	Algeria	36.623	5.328	10	5.2 M_{w}		4	4		4	
2006-03-25 07:28	Iran	27.574	55.685	18	5.9 M_{w}		1	1			
2006-03-31 01:17	Iran (see 2006 Borujerd earthquake)	33.500	48.780	7	6.1 M_{w}		70	70		63	
2006-04-25 11:26	Australia	-41.164	146.863	4	2.2 M_{L}		0	1			
2006-05-26 22:53	Indonesia (see 2006 Yogyakarta earthquake)	-7.961	110.446	12	6.4 M_{w}		5749	5749			
2006-06-03 07:15	Iran	26.759	55.843	12	5.1 M_{w}		2	2			
2006-07-17 08:19	Indonesia (see 2006 Pangandaran earthquake and tsunami)	-9.254	107.411	34	7.7 M_{w}	T	0	730			
2006-07-22 01:10	China (see 2006 Yanjin earthquake)	27.995	104.138	55	4.9 M_{w}	L	0	22		22	
2006-07-29 00:11	Tajikistan (see 2006 Tajikistan earthquake)	37.255	68.828	34	5.6 M_{w}		3	3		3	
2006-08-25 05:51	China	28.012	104.151	21	5.0 M_{w}	L	1	1			
2006-09-29 18:23	Venezuela	10.814	-61.758	52	5.5 M_{w}		1	1			
2006-12-01 14:01	Indonesia	-8.251	118.777	43	6.3 M_{w}		0	1			
2006-12-17 21:39	Indonesia	0.626	99.859	30	5.8 M_{w}	L	7	7			
2006-12-26 12:26	Taiwan (see 2006 Hengchun earthquakes)	21.799	120.547	10	7.0 M_{w}		2	2			
2007-01-21 11:27	Indonesia	1.065	126.282	22	7.5 M_{w}		3	4			
2007-03-06 03:49	Indonesia (see March 2007 Sumatra earthquakes)	-0.480	100.470	19.3	6.4 M_{w}		67	67		67	
2007-03-25 00:41	Japan (see 2007 Noto earthquake)	37.340	136.540	8	6.7 M_{w}	T	1	1		1	
2007-04-01 20:39	Solomon Islands (see 2007 Solomon Islands earthquake	-8.430	157.060	10	8.1 M_{w}	T,L	0	54			
2007-04-21 17:53	Chile (see 2007 Aysén Fjord earthquake)	-45.240	-72.670	36.7	6.2 M_{w}	T,L	0	10		10	
2007-06-02 21:34	China	23.020	101.010	5	6.1 M_{w}	L	3	3		3	
2007-07-16 01:13	Japan (see 2007 Chūetsu offshore earthquake)	37.520	138.460	12	6.6 M_{w}	T,L	9	9		9	
2007-07-21 22:44	Tajikistan	38.936	70.485	10	5.2 M_{w}	L	3	12		11	
2007-08-02 02:37	Russia	47.110	141.810	5	6.2 M_{w}	T	2	2		2	
2007-08-15 23:40	Peru (see 2007 Peru earthquake)	-13.380	-76.610	39	8.0 M_{w}	L	514	514		519	
2007-09-12 11:10	Indonesia	-4.440	101.370	34	8.5 M_{w}	T	25	25			
2007-09-12 23:49	Indonesia	-2.660	100.830	37.3	7.9 M_{w}						
2007-09-13 03:35	Indonesia	-2.150	99.610	27	7.1 M_{w}						
2007-10-26 06:50	Pakistan	35.304	76.753	10	5.2 M_{w}	L	1	1			
2007-11-06 09:38	India	21.181	70.724	10	5.1 M_{w}		1	1			
2007-11-07 04:12	Philippines	9.721	124.647	71	5.3 M_{w}		1	1			
2007-11-14 15:40	Chile	-22.247	-69.890	40	7.7 M_{w}	T	2	2			
2007-11-25 16:02	Indonesia	-8.292	118.370	20	6.5 M_{w}		3	3			
2007-11-29 19:00	Martinique	14.944	-61.274	156	7.4 M_{w}		1	1			
2007-12-09 02:03	Brazil	-15.048	-44.231	10	4.9 mb		1	1			
2007-12-20 07:55	New Zealand (see 2007 Gisborne earthquake)	-39.011	178.291	20	6.6 M_{w}		0	1			
2008-01-09 22:24	Algeria	35.616	-0.570	10	4.6 Mb		1	1			
2008-01-22 17:14	Indonesia	1.011	97.442	20	6.2 M_{w}		1	1			
2008-02-03 07:34	Democratic Republic of the Congo (see 2008 Lake Kivu earthquake)	-2.296	28.900	10	5.9 M_{w}		44	44		43	
2008-02-06 06:09	India	23.433	87.111	10	4.3 mb		1	1			
2008-02-14 02:07	Rwanda	-2.404	28.918	10	5.3 M_{w}		1	1			
2008-02-20 08:08	Indonesia (see 2008 Simeulue earthquake)	2.768	95.964	26	7.3 M_{w}		3	3		3	
2008-05-12 06:28	China (see 2008 Sichuan earthquake)	31.002	103.322	19	7.9 M_{w}	L	69195	88287		87476	
2008-05-24 19:20	Colombia	4.330	-73.764	8	5.9 M_{w}	L	0	6			
2008-05-25 08:21	China	32.560	105.423	18	6.1 M_{w}	L	8	8			
2008-06-06 20:02	Algeria	35.883	-0.658	4	5.5 M_{w}		0	1			
2008-06-08 12:25	Greece (see 2008 Peloponnese earthquake)	37.963	21.525	16	6.4 M_{w}		2	2		2	
2008-06-13 23:43	Japan (see 2008 Iwate–Miyagi Nairiku earthquake)	39.030	140.881	7	6.9 M_{w}	L	13	13		13	
2008-06-17 05:51	China	32.761	105.554	10	4.8 mb		2	2			
2008-07-15 03:26	Greece (see 2008 Dodecanese earthquake)	35.983	27.785	68	6.4 M_{w}						
2008-08-21 12:24	China (see 2008 Yingjiang earthquakes)	25.1	97.9		5.9 M_{s}						
2008-08-30 8:30	China (see 2008 Panzhihua earthquake)	26.0	101.9	10	5.7 M_{w}						41
2008-10-05 15:52	Kyrgyzstan (see 2008 Kyrgyzstan earthquake)	39.515	73.768	27.6	6.9 M_{w}						60
2008-10-06 16:30	China (see 2008 Damxung earthquake)				6.4 M_{w}						
2008-10-28 23:09	Pakistan (see 2008 Ziarat earthquakes)				6.4 M_{w}						215
2009-01-08 19:21	Costa Rica (see 2009 Cinchona earthquake)	10.3962	-84.0281	48	6.1 M_{w}	L					34
2009-04-06 03:32	Italy (see 2009 L'Aquila earthquake)	42.334	13.334	8.8	6.2 M_{w}						295
2009-07-09 11:19	China (see 2009 Yunnan earthquake)				5.7 M_{w}						
2009-08-10 20:07	Japan (see 2009 Shizuoka earthquake)				6.4 M_{w}						1
2009-09-02 07:55	Indonesia (see 2009 West Java earthquake)				7.0 M_{w}						79
2009-09-29 17:48	Samoa (see 2009 Samoa earthquake and tsunami)			8.1	8.1 M_{w}						189
2009-09-30 10:16	Indonesia (see 2009 Sumatra earthquakes)				7.6 M_{w}						1115
2010-01-12 17:00	Haiti (see 2010 Haiti earthquake)	18.457	-72.533	13	7.0 M_{w}						222517
2010-02-27 06:34	Chile (see 2010 Chile earthquake)	-35.846	-72.719	35	8.8 M_{w}	T					521
2010-03-08 02:32	Turkey (see 2010 Elâzığ earthquake)				6.1 M_{w}						42
2010-03-11 14:39	Chile (see 2010 Pichilemu earthquakes)				6.9 M_{w}	L					1
2010-04-14 23:49	China (see 2010 Yushu earthquake)				6.9 M_{w}	L					2698
2011-02-21 23:51	New Zealand (see 2011 Christchurch earthquake)				6.3 M_{w}	Lq					185
2011-03-10 04:58	China (see 2011 Yunnan earthquake)				5.4 M_{w}						
2011-03-11 14:46	Japan (see 2011 Tōhoku earthquake)	38.322	142.369	24.4	9.0 M_{w}	T					15894
2011-03-24 20:25	Myanmar (see 2011 Myanmar earthquake)				6.8 M_{w}						150+
2011-04-07 14:32	Japan (see April 2011 Miyagi earthquake)	38.2	140.0	66.0	7.1 M_{w}						
2011-09-18 12:40	India (see 2011 Sikkim earthquake)	27.723	88.064	19.7	6.9 M_{w}	L					111+
2011-09-23 10:41	Turkey (see 2011 Van earthquakes)	38.6	43.5	7.2	7.1 M_{w}						601 (as of October 30, 2011)
2015-04-25 06:11	Nepal (see April 2015 Nepal earthquake)	28.230	84.731	8.2	7.8 M_{w}						8964
2018-08-05 19:46	Indonesia (see Lombok earthquake)			31.0	6.9 M_{w}						
2018-09-28 10:02	Indonesia (see 2018 Sulawesi earthquake and tsunami)	0.178	119.840	20.0	7.5 M_{w}	T,Lq					4340+
2020-10-30 11:51	Turkey, Greece (see 2020 Aegean Sea earthquake)	37.918	26.790	21.0	7.0 M_{ww}	T					118
2020-12-29 11:19:54	Croatia (see 2020 Petrinja earthquake)	45.4002	16.2187	10	6.4 M_{w}						7
2022-06-21 21:54	Afghanistan, Pakistan (see June 2022 Afghanistan earthquake)	33.092	69.514	10.0	6.2 M_{w} 6.0 M_{ww}				1000		
2023-02-06 01:17	Turkey, Syria (see 2023 Turkey–Syria earthquakes)	37.166	37.062	17.9	7.8 M_{uk}				53560		
2023-9-8 22:11	Morocco (See 2023 Morocco earthquake)				6.9				2960		
2024-1-1 16:10	Japan (See 2024 Noto earthquake)				7.5				557		
2024-1-23 18:09	China (See 2024 Uqturpan earthquake)				7.0				3		
2024-4-2 7:58	Taiwan (See 2024 Hualien earthquake)				7.4				19		
2024-12-17 1:47	Vanuatu (See 2024 Port Vila earthquake)				7.3				14		
2025-1-7 09:05	China (See 2025 Tibet earthquake)				7.1				128		
2025-3-28 12:50	Myanmar, Thailand (See 2025 Myanmar earthquake)				7.7				2610		

* Most fatalities attributed to tsunami

== See also ==
For death tolls of other natural disasters or significant historical earthquakes that predate 1900, see:

- List of natural disasters by death toll
- Lists of earthquakes
