= Sobha =

Sobha may refer to:

== Places ==
- Sobha, Algeria, a town and commune in Chlef Province
- Sobha, Nepal, a village development committee
- Sobha Hi-tech city, a proposed township in India

== People ==
- Sobha Brahma (1929–2012), Indian painter and sculptor
- Sobha Singh (builder) (1890–1978), Indian Sikh real estate developer
- Sobha Singh (painter) (1901–1986), Indian Sikh painter

== Other uses ==
- Sobha Ltd., an Indian multinational real estate developer
- Sobha (1958 film), a Telugu drama film

== See also ==
- Shobha (Mahalakshmi Menon, 1962–1980), Indian actress
