= Oued Fodda =

Oued Fodda وادى الفضة
- Commune and town
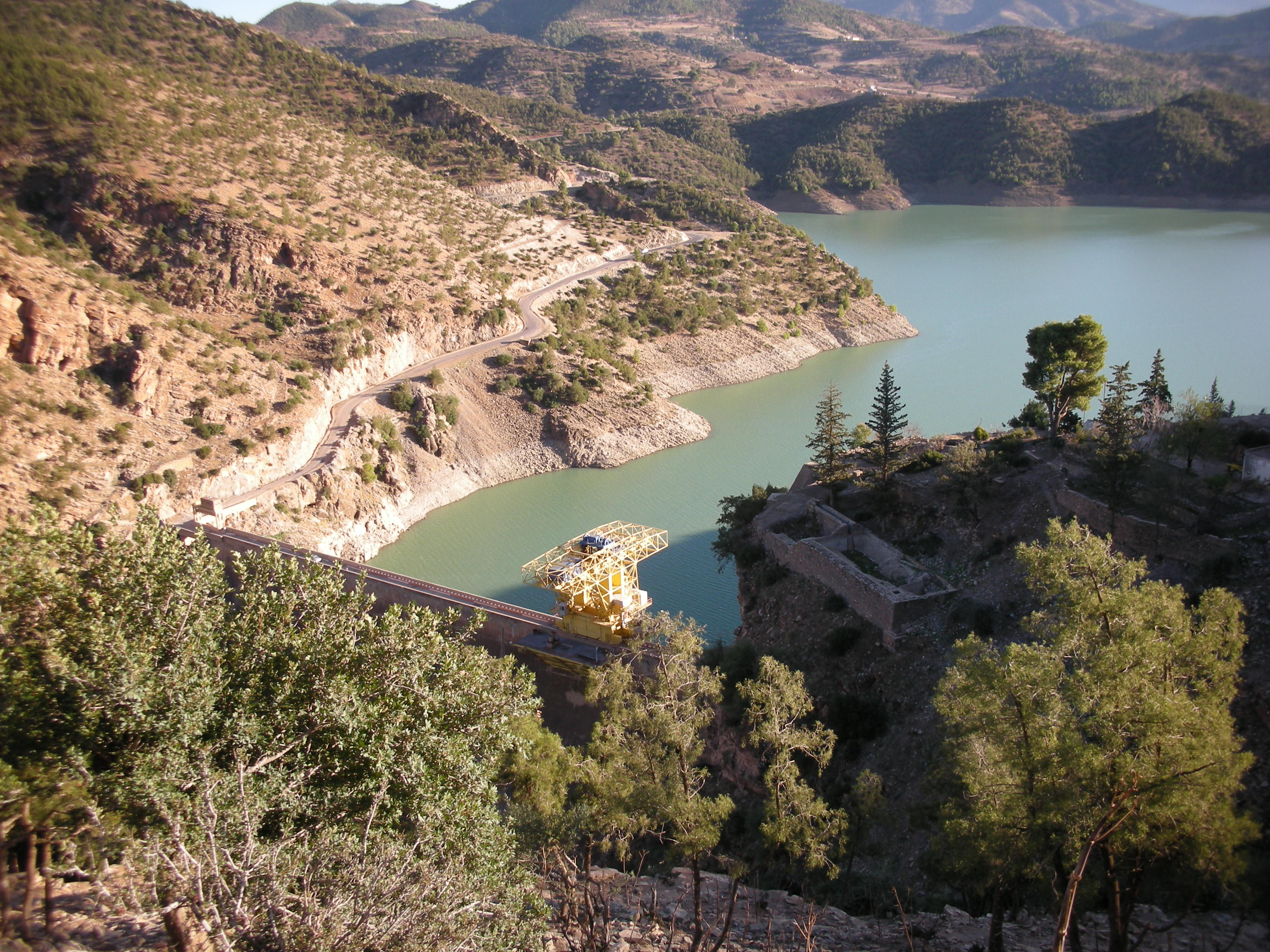
- Oued Fodda River Dam

- Location within Algeria
- Country: Algeria
- Province: Chlef Province
- District: Oued Fodda
- Elevation: 660–750 ft (200–230 m)

Population (2008)
  - Total: 41 710
- Time zone: UTC+1 (CET)
- Postal code: 02100

Oued Fodda is a town and commune in Chlef Province, Algeria. According to the 1998 census it has a population of 36,187.

== Description ==
Oued Fodda is one of the communes of the Chlef Province in Algeria, it is located 20 km east of the town of Chlef, and it was founded in 1883, at the confluence of Oued Fodda and Oued Chelif rivers. It is crossed by the national road 04, and the way of wilaya 132.

== Climate ==
Climate data for Qued Fodda
Month	Jan	Feb	Mar	Apr	May	Jun	Jul	Aug	Sep	Oct	Nov	Dec	Year
Mean daily maximum °C (°F)	14 (57)	16 (60)	20 (68)	23 (73)	27 (80)	33 (91)	38 (100)	38 (100)	33 (91)	26 (78)	19 (66)	15 (59)	25 (77)
Mean daily minimum °C (°F)	4 (39)	5 (41)	7 (44)	9 (48)	12 (53)	17 (62)	20 (68)	20 (68)	17 (62)	13 (55)	9 (48)	5 (41)	11 (51)
Average precipitation mm (inches)	56 (2.2)	48 (1.9)	43 (1.7)	41 (1.6)	33 (1.3)	7.6 (0.3)	0 (0)	2.5 (0.1)	20 (0.8)	41 (1.6)	56 (2.2)	61 (2.4)	410 (16.1)
Source: Weatherbase

== Historical note ==
During the Algerian War, the French armed forces based the Centre d'Entrainement et de Perfectionnement des Commandos de Chasse No.1 here. It was a special operations school that trained the Commandos de Chasse. It opened in July 1959 and closed in March, 1962.

Commandos de Chasse were company-sized security units of Algerian Harkis ["Volunteer Auxiliary Troops"] led by French officers and NCOs. Their job was to track and pin down FLN Katibas ["irregular units of Section or Company strength"] infiltrating from Tunisia and Morocco or operating in the bled ("high desert") so they could be attacked by larger conventional French Union forces.

Army units had the callsign Pagoda or Kimono and Gendarmerie units had the callsign Pirate or Partisan.

== Notable locals ==
- Auguste Rencorel (1896-1983), French politician
- Rabie Benchergui (born 1978), Algerian footballer
- Nour El Islam Fettouhi (born 1999), Algerian footballer
