= Abdelkader Ben Bouali =

French Algerian footballer (1912-1997)

Personal information
- Full name: Abdelkader Ben Bouali
- Date of birth: 25 October 1912
- Place of birth: Sendjas, French Algeria
- Date of death: 23 February 1997 (aged 84)
- Place of death: Algiers, Algeria
- Position: Defender

Senior career*
| Years | Team | Apps | (Gls) |
| 1932–1933 | RU Alger | | |
| 1933–1935 | Montpellier | 46 | (1) |
| 1935–1936 | FC Sète | 28 | (0) |
| 1936–1938 | Marseille | 56 | (0) |
| 1938–1939 | RC Paris | | |
| 1939–1940 | Toulouse | | |
| 1940–1946 | Wydad AC Casablanca | | |

International career
| 1937 | France | 1 | (0) |
- * Club domestic league appearances and goals

Abdelkader Ben Bouali (25 October 1912 in Sendjas, Chlef Province – 23 February 1997 in Algiers) was a professional French footballer, the first of North African descent to play on the national team.

== Bibliography ==
- "Profile". fff.fr.
- "Profile". om1899.com. Archived from the original on 14 November 2007.
