= Rencurel (disambiguation) =

Rencurel is a commune in the Isère department in southeastern France.

It is also a surname. Notable people with the surname include:

- Auguste Rencurel (1896–1983), French politician
- Benoîte Rencurel (1647–1718), shepherdess from Saint-Étienne-le-Laus, France who is said to have seen apparitions from the Virgin Mary from 1664 to 1718
- Jérémy Rencurel (born 1995), French BMX rider
