= Ténès =

تنس
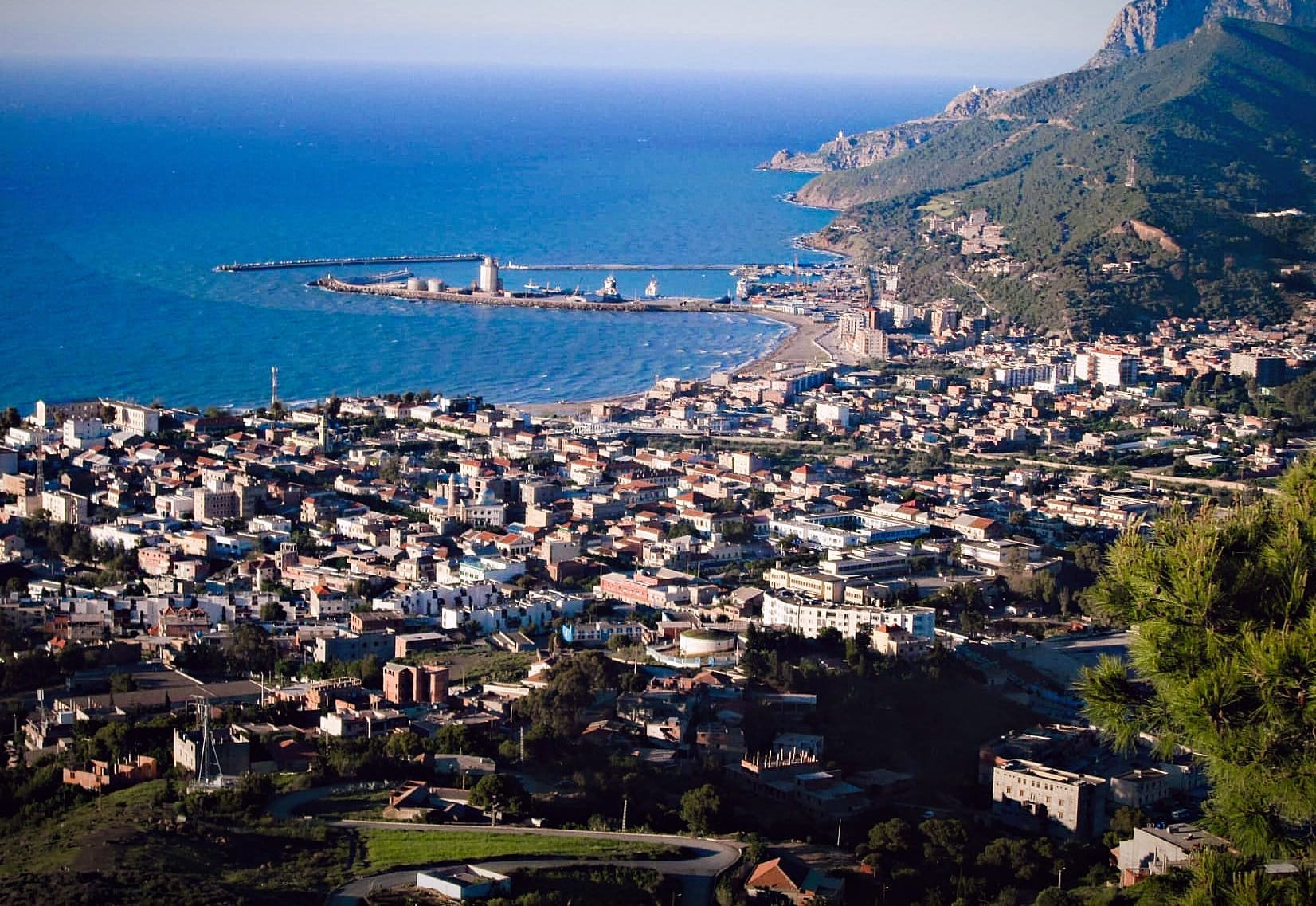
- Skyview of Ténès

- within the Chlef wilaya
- Coordinates: 36°30′44″N 1°18′16″E
- Country: Algeria
- Province: Chlef Province
- District: Ténès

Area
  - Total: 101 km^{2} (39 sq mi)
- Elevation: 779 m (2,556 ft)

Population (2008)
  - Total: 35,459
  - Density: 351/km^{2} (909/sq mi)
  - Summer (DST): UTC+1 (CET)
- Cap Ténès Lighthouse
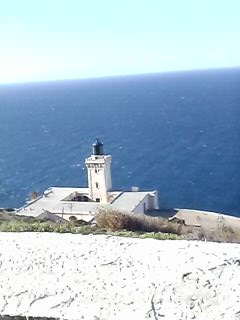
- Constructed: 1861
- Foundation: stone base
- Construction: stone tower
- Height: 31.50 metres (103.3 ft)
- Shape: quadrangular tower with balcony and lantern
- Markings: white lantern, dark green lantern
- Power source: mains electricity
- Operator: National Maritime Signaling Office
- Focal height: 94.50 metres (310.0 ft)
- Intensity: 1,000 W
- Range: 29 nautical miles (54 km; 33 mi)
- Characteristic: Fl(2) W 10s

Ténès (Arabic: تنس; from Berber TNS 'camping') is a town in Algeria located around 200 kilometers west of the capital Algiers. As of 2000, it has a population of 65,000 people.

== History ==
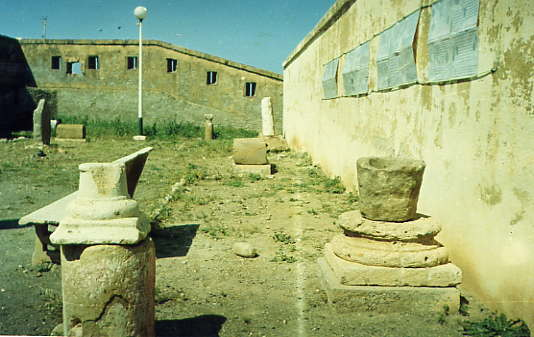
Ruins in Ténès

Ténès was founded as a Phoenician port in or before the 8th century BC. As with other Phoenician harbors, it fell under the hegemony of Carthage around the 6th century BC and of the Romans after the Punic Wars. Its Punic name was Latinized as Cartenna or Cartennae, a plural which suggested the existence of a separate Berber settlement nearby. Ptolemy mentions that the local tribes were known as the "Bakoyta". The city rose to colony status under the empire.

It was sacked by the Vandals during their conquest of Roman North Africa. Reconquered by the Byzantines and then taken by the Umayyad Caliphate, it disappeared except for a mostly ruined fortification.

Medieval Ténès was founded by Spaniards in the 9th century; Al-Bakri dates it to 875 or 876 (262 AH). They established their base 3.2 km (2 mi) from the former settlement. They invited settlers from Elvira and Murcia but many left owing to outbreaks of fever among the new settlers. They were replaced by Berbers from Suk Ibrahim on the Chelif. The city prospered in spite of an unhealthy climate owing to the fertility of the surrounding countryside, which produced fruit and grain in relative abundance.

A local dynasty claiming descent from Ali prospered for a time. They recognized as their overlords the Umayyads, who treated the town as a kind of prison camp for exiles. After the 10th century, it passed in succession under Fatimid, Sanhaja, Maghrawa, Almoravid, Almohad, and Ziyanid control. In the later 15th century, it prospered amid the exodus of Moors from the War of Granada. The locals overthrew the last of its foreign rulers and established a local sheikh, whose dynasty was eventually compelled to become vassals of Spain.

Ténès was sacked by Oruç Reis in 1517 and conquered for the Ottoman Empire by his brother Hayreddin Barbarossa a few years later. The town was given a garrison but its economic life gradually collapsed, with its European trade in grain gone by the 18th century. Berber revolts sacked the city and attempted to overthrow Ottoman rule on several occasions.

Following the French invasion of Algiers in 1830, Ténès fell under the control of the Emir Abdelkader, who tried to revive its port. The locals finally surrendered to the French without a fight in 1843. Bugeaud then used it as a base to control the Chelif Valley.

Mistaken accounts in the ancient geographers originally caused the French to assume ancient Cartennae had been at Mostaganem, but engravings were soon discovered by archaeologists which established the correct identification. Modern Ténès was established at the ruins of the Phoenician and Roman colony by the French in 1847. Its harbor about 1.5 km distant originally served as a port for goods from the Chelif, but declined following the construction of the Algiers–Oran railway.

== Present ==
At the present time Ténès is a small tourist town with five small hotels, two hospitals, a local museum, a port and a lighthouse. It has some antique sites such as the Phoenician and Roman tombs, the prehistoric caves in Sidi Merouane, the Great Mosque of Sidi Ahmed Boumaza (built some 11 centuries ago), Bab El Bahr, Notre Dame de Ténès, The French cannons, along with many others.

== See also ==
- List of lighthouses in Algeria
- Diocesi di Cartenna on Italian Wikipedia
- Sulaymanid dynasty
