= Shova =

Shova may refer to:

- Hamida Banu Shova (born 1954), Bangladeshi politician and founder and chairperson of Queens University, Bangladesh
- Princess Shova Shahi of Nepal (born 1949)
- Shova or Sobha, Nepal, a village development committee
- HMT Shova, a Second World War Royal Navy trawler - see List of requisitioned trawlers of the Royal Navy (WWII)
