= Azzedine Doukha =

Professional Goalkeeper Coach (born 1986)

Personal information
- Full name: Azzedine Doukha
- Date of birth: 5 August 1986 (age 40)
- Place of birth: Chettia, Algeria
- Height: 1.88 m (6 ft 2 in)
- Position: Goalkeeper

Youth career
- 2001–2004: ASO Chlef

Senior career*
Years	Team	Apps	(Gls)
2004–2006	ASO Chlef	2	(0)
2006	JSM Tiaret	11	(0)
2006–2008	MO Béjaïa	20	(0)
2008–2009	MC Alger	3	(0)
2010–2014	USM El Harrach	108	(0)
2014–2016	JS Kabylie	51	(0)
2016–2017	NA Hussein Dey	25	(0)
2017–2018	Ohod	29	(0)
2018–2021	Al-Raed	83	(0)
2021–2022	JS Kabylie	27	(0)
2022–2023	CR Belouizdad	2	(0)

International career
2010	Algeria A'	2	(0)
2011–2019	Algeria	15	(0)
Medal record
Men's football
Representing Algeria
Africa Cup of Nations
Winner	2019 Egypt
- * Club domestic league appearances and goals

Azzedine Doukha (Arabic: عز الدين دوخه; born 5 August 1986) is an Algerian professional football goalkeeping coach who formerly played as a goalkeeper.

== Club career ==
Doukha was born in Chettia, Algeria.

On 31 August 2009 Doukha went on trial with Portuguese club Vitória de Setúbal. In 2021, he signed a contract with JS Kabylie. In 2022, he joined CR Belouizdad.

== Retirement ==
On 13 September 2023, at the age of 37 and after a 19-year playing career, Doukha announced his retirement from professional football.

== International career ==
On 28 December 2010 Doukha made his debut for the Algerian A' national team starting in a 3–1 friendly win over Chad.

On 14 May 2011 Doukha was called up to the Algerian national team for the first time for a 2012 Africa Cup of Nations qualifier against Morocco.

== Honours ==
=== Club ===
USM El Harrach

- Algerian Cup runners-up: 2011

CR Belouizdad

- Algerian Ligue Professionnelle 1: 2022–23

=== National ===
Algeria

- Africa Cup of Nations: 2019
