= Moussadek =

- Commune and town

- Location within Algeria
- Coordinates: 36.35°N 1.016667°E
- Country: Algeria
- Province: Chlef Province
- District: El Marsa

Population (1998)
  - Total: 5,496
- Time zone: UTC+1 (CET)

Moussadek is a town and commune in Chlef Province, Algeria. According to the 1998 census it has a population of 5,496.
