= Labiod Medjadja =

Coordinates: 36°15′N 1°24′E

Labiod Medjadja لبيض مجاجة
- Commune and town
- Country: Algeria
- Province: Chlef Province
- District: Ouled Farès

Population (2008)
  - Total: 14,733
- Time zone: UTC+1 (CET)

Labiod Medjadja is a town and commune in Chlef Province, Algeria. According to the 1998 census it has a population of 13,920.
