= Zeboudja =

Zeboudja الزبوجة
- Commune and town

- Location within Algeria
- Coordinates: 36.350527°N 1.430283°E
- Country: Algeria
- Province: Chlef Province
- District: Zeboudja

Population (2008)
  - Total: 26,539
- Time zone: UTC+1 (CET)

Zeboudja is a town and commune in Chlef Province, Algeria. According to the 1998 census it has a population of 23,079.
