= Sobha Hi-tech city =

Planned industry township in Kochi, India

Sobha Hi-tech city is a planned industry township for knowledge-based companies to be constructed in Kochi, India. The project, being constructed by Sobha Developers Ltd, will come up at Maradu. With an initial investment of Rs. 50 billion, the project also has the single highest investment in Kerala. On completion, the project is expected to have 7,000,000 square feet (650,000 m^{2}) of developed space for research, trade and development in Information technology, biotechnology, electronic hardware and other knowledge based services. The project would be among the largest such ventures in the country, and is expected to generate over 75,000 direct jobs.

There were major opposition to the project from parties in the ruling Left Democratic Front and environmental activists alleging massive destruction to the environment. Despite the delays due to this, the government recently gave permission to this proposed project. More bureaucratic formalities need to be completed before the construction begins. The current status of this project looks bleak as the proposed land comes under the purview Coastal regulatory zone(CRZ)law, which forbids any massive construction.

== See also ==
- Economy of Kochi
