= Benairia =

Coordinates: 36°21′N 1°23′E

Benairia بنايرية
- Commune and town
- Country: Algeria
- Province: Chlef Province
- District: Zeboudja

Population (2008)
  - Total: 13,200
- Time zone: UTC+1 (CET)

Benairia is a town and commune in Chlef Province, Algeria. According to the 1998 census it has a population of 13,509.
