= Oued Gousine =

Oued Gousine وادى قوسين
- Commune and town
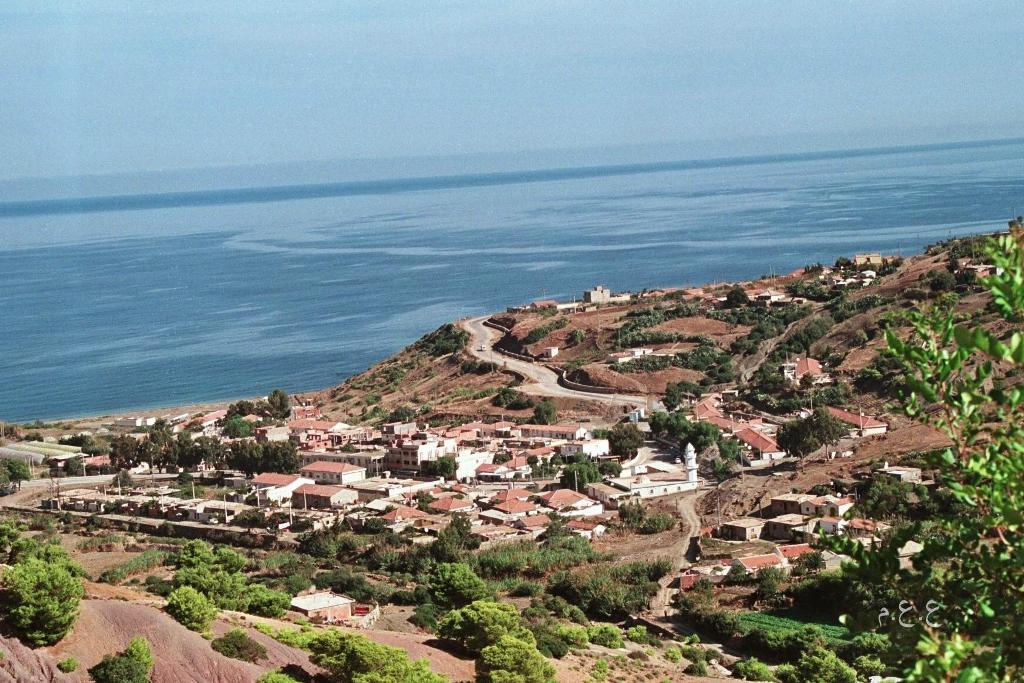

- Location within Algeria
- Coordinates: 36°31′32″N 1°29′48″E
- Country: Algeria
- Province: Chlef Province
- District: Beni Haoua

Population (2008)
  - Total: 6,453
- Time zone: UTC+1 (CET)

Oued Gousine is a town and commune in Chlef Province, Algeria. According to the 1998 census it has a population of 5,439.
