= Aïn Merane District =

- District
- Country: Algeria
- Province: Chlef Province

Population (2008)
  - Total: 69,125
- Time zone: UTC+1 (CET)

Aïn Merane District is a district of Chlef Province, Algeria.

== Communes ==
The district is further divided into 2 communes:

- Aïn Merane
- Harenfa
