= Dahra, Algeria =

Coordinates: 36.25533°N 0.85174°E

Dahra, Algeria الظھرة
- Commune and town
- Country: Algeria
- Province: Chlef Province
- District: Taougrit

Population (2008)
  - Total: 23,802
- Time zone: UTC+1 (CET)

Dahra, Algeria is a town and commune in Chlef Province, Algeria. According to the 1998 census, it has a population of 21,284.
