= Chlef District =

Coordinates: 36°09′19″N 1°19′55″E

- District
- Location of the District in the Chlef Province.
- Country: Algeria
- Province: Chlef Province

Population (2008)
  - Total: 229,085
- Time zone: UTC+1 (CET)

Chlef District is a district of Chlef Province, Algeria.

== Communes ==
The district is further divided into 3 communes:

- Chlef
- Sendjas
- Oum Drou
