= Aïn Merane =

Ain Merane عين مران
- Commune and town
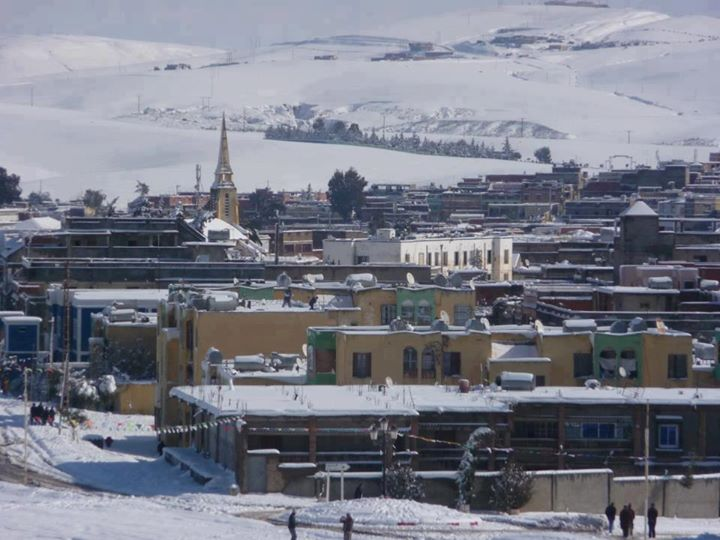

- Location within Algeria
- Coordinates: 36.162825°N 0.970516°E
- Country: Algeria
- Province: Chlef Province
- District: Aïn Merane

Population (2008)
  - Total: 51,326
- Time zone: UTC+1 (CET)

Ain Merane is a town and commune in Chlef Province, Algeria. According to the 2008 census it has a population of 51,326.
