= Abou El Hassen =

Coordinates: 36°25′N 1°12′E

- Commune and town
- Country: Algeria
- Province: Chlef Province
- District: Abou El Hassan

Population (1998)
  - Total: 20,164
- Time zone: UTC+1 (CET)

Abou El Hassen is a town and commune in Abou El Hassan District, Chlef Province, lying on the Mediterranean Sea, northern Algeria. According to the 1998 census the settlement has a population of approximately 20,164. The commune is the capital of the district it is situated in.
