= Ouled Ben Abdelkader District =

Coordinates: 36°01′33″N 1°16′35″E

- District
- Country: Algeria
- Province: Chlef Province

Population (2008)
  - Total: 36,908
- Time zone: UTC+1 (CET)

Ouled Ben Abdelkader District is a district of Chlef Province, Algeria.

== Communes ==
The district is further divided into 2 communes:

- Ouled Ben Abdelkader --28 430
- El Hadjadj -- 8 478
