= Bouzghaia =

Algerian town and commune

Coordinates: 36°20′N 1°15′E

Bouzghaia بوزغاية
- Commune and town
- Country: Algeria
- Province: Chlef Province
- District: Zeboudja

Population (2008)
  - Total: 22,590
- Time zone: UTC+1 (CET)

Bouzghaia is a town and commune in Chlef Province, Algeria. According to the 1998 census it has a population of 20,268.
