= Zeboudja District =

Coordinates: 36°21′01″N 1°25′49″E

Zeboudja District دائرة الزبوجة
- District
- Country: Algeria
- Province: Chlef Province

Population (2008)
  - Total: 62,329
- Time zone: UTC+1 (CET)

Zeboudja District is a district of Chlef Province, Algeria.

== Communes ==
The district is further divided into 3 communes:

- Zeboudja
- Bénairia
- Bouzeghaia
