= El Hadjadj =

Coordinates: 36°10′N 4°51′E

- Commune and town
- Country: Algeria
- Province: Chlef Province
- District: Ouled Ben Abdelkader

Population (2008)
  - Total: 8,478
- Time zone: UTC+1 (CET)

El Hadjadj is a town and commune in Chlef Province, Algeria. According to the 1998 census it has a population of 8,478.
