= Sidi Abderrahmane, Chlef =

Sidi Abderrahmane, Chlef سيدي عبد الرحمان
- Commune and town
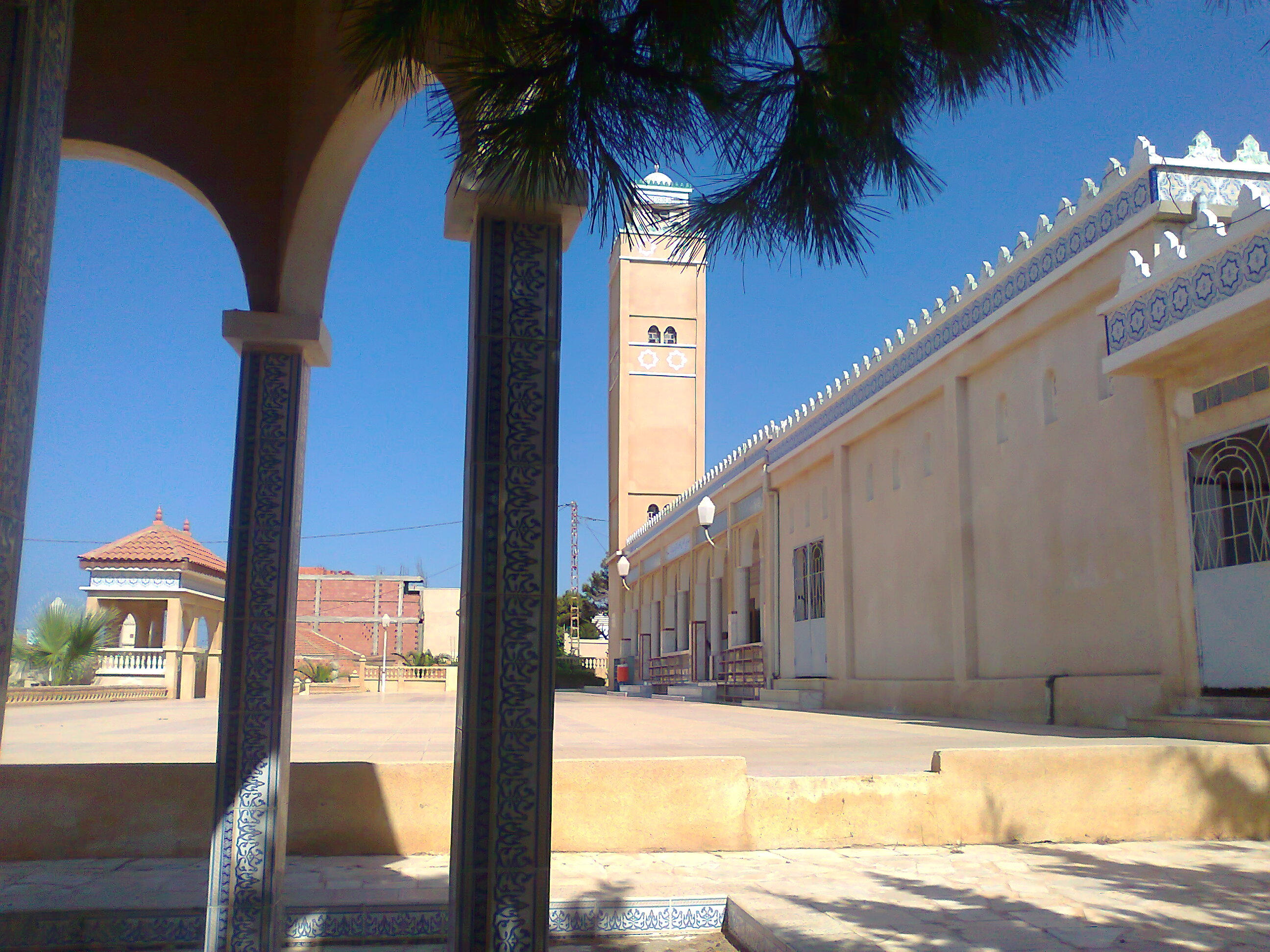

- Location within Algeria
- Country: Algeria
- Province: Chlef Province
- District: Ténès

Population (2008)
  - Total: 4,349
- Time zone: UTC+1 (CET)

Sidi Abderrahmane, Chlef is a town and commune in Chlef Province, Algeria. According to the 1998 census it has a population of 3,630.
