= El Karimia =

Coordinates: 36°07′N 1°33′E

- Town and commune
- Country: Algeria
- Province: Chlef Province
- District: El Karimia

Population (1998)
  - Total: 25,060
- Time zone: UTC+1 (CET)

El Karimia is a town and commune in Chlef Province, Algeria. According to the 1998 census it has a population of 25,060.
