= Chlef Province =

Province of Algeria

Chlef Province ولاية الشلف
- Province
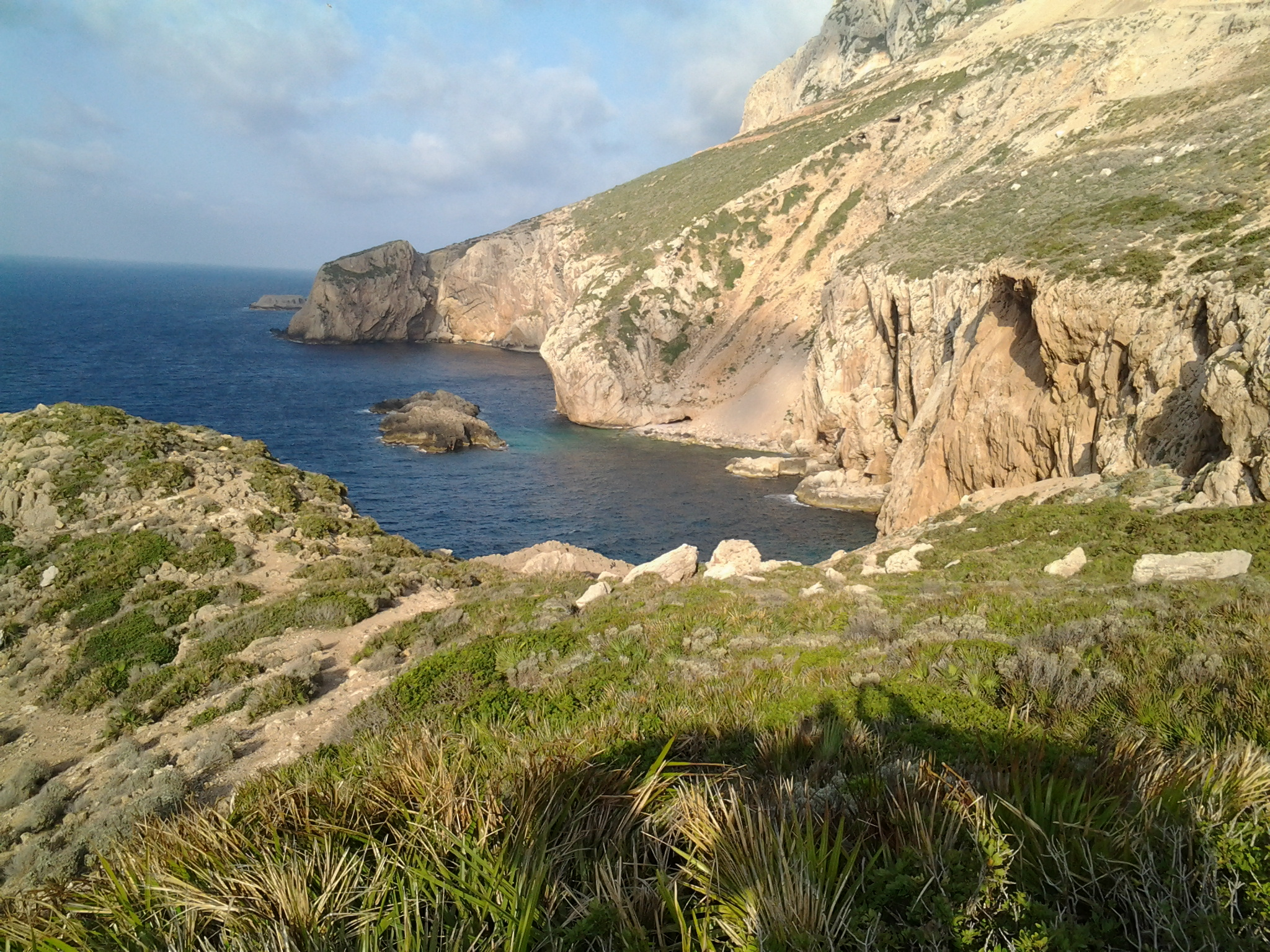
- The coast of Chlef Province

- Map of Algeria highlighting Chlef
- Coordinates: 36°10′N 01°20′E
- Country: Algeria
- Capital: Chlef

Government
  - PPA president: Mohamed Meheni (FLN)
  - Wāli: Mr. Lakhdar Sedas

Area
  - Total: 4,975 km^{2} (1,921 sq mi)

Population (2008)
  - Total: 1,013,718
  - Density: 203.8/km^{2} (527.7/sq mi)
- Time zone: UTC+01 (CET)
- Area Code: +213 (0) 27
- ISO 3166 code: DZ-02
- Districts: 13
- Municipalities: 35
- Website: wilaya-chlef.com

Chlef (Arabic: ولاية الشلف, Berber: ⴰⴳⴻⵣⴷⵓ ⵏ ⵛⵍⴻⴼ) (formerly known as El Asnam) is a province (wilaya) in Algeria with its capital and biggest city being Chlef. It is the 8th most populous province in the country, having 1.356.151 inhabitants (2021).

Chlef Province is an important agricultural region, as it is located on the plain of the Middle Chelif Basin and has access to an abundance of water resources. 65.43% of the province is dedicated to agriculture. Other notable industries in the province include breeding, glass production, and plastic processing. As well as these industries, Chlef Province is also home to two dams.

Being located in the Atlas Mountains, Chlef also has a sizeable seismic risk, being struck by a 6.7 magnitude earthquake in 1954 and a 7.1 magnitude earthquake in 1980.

== History ==
The province was originally named El Asnam until 1980 when it became known at Ech Chéliff, later known as Chlef.

In 1980, a 7.1 magnitude earthquake struck the province, killing up to 5,000 and displacing 300,000.

In 1984, Aïn Defla Province was carved out of its territory.

== Geography ==
=== Location ===
The province of Chlef is located at the Western Tell, in the Algérois region 200 km west of Algiers.

== Administrative divisions ==
The province is divided into 13 districts (daïras), which are further divided into 35 communes or municipalities.

=== Districts ===
1. Abou El Hassan (دائرة أبو الحسن)
2. Aïn Merane (دائرة عين مران)
3. Béni Haoua (دائرة بني حواء)
4. Boukadir (دائرة بوقادير)
5. Chlef (دائرة شلف)
6. El Karimia (دائرة الكريمية)
7. El Marsa (دائرة المرسى)
8. Oued Fodda (دائرة وادي الفضة)
9. Ouled Ben Abdelkader (دائرة اولاد بن عبد القادر)
10. Ouled Farès (دائرة اولاد فارس)
11. Taougrit (دائرة تاوقريت)
12. Ténès (دائرة تنس)
13. Zeboudja (دائرة زبوجة)

=== Communes ===
No.	Commune	Arabic	Population
01	Chlef	الشلف	146,157
02	Ténès	تنس	34,332
03	Benairia (Bénairia)	بنايرية	13,509
04	El Karimia	الكريمية	25,060
05	Tadjna (Tadjena)	تأجنة	22,155
06	Taougrit (Taougrite)	تاوقريت	24,267
07	Beni Haoua	بنى حواء	17,602
08	Sobha	صبحة	28,646
09	Harchoun (Harchoune)	حرشون	14,869
10	Ouled Fares	أولاد فارس	30,068
11	Sidi Akkacha	سيدى عكاشة	23,374
12	Boukadir	بوقادير	41,655
13	Beni Rached	بنى راشد	21,069
14	Talassa (Telassa)	تلعصة	10,175
15	Harenfa (Herenfa)	الھرنفة	16,356
16	Oued Gousine (Oued Goussine)	وادى قوسين	5,439
17	Dahra	الظھرة	21,284
18	Ouled Abbes	أولاد عباس	7,330
19	Sendjas	السنجاس	26,228
20	Zeboudja	الزبوجة	23,079
21	Oued Sly	وادى سلى	41,245
22	Abou El Hassen (Abou El Hassan)	أبو الحسن	20,164
23	El Marsa	المرسى	9,726
24	Chettia	الشطية	59,960
25	Sidi Abderrahmane	سيدي عبد الرحمان	3,630
26	Moussadek	مصدق	5,496
27	El Hadjadj	الحجاج	9,245
28	Labiod Medjadja	الابيض مجاجة	13,920
29	Oued Fodda	وادى الفضة	36,187
30	Ouled Ben Abdelkader	أولاد بن عبد القادر	17,385
31	Bouzghaia (Bouzeghaia)	بوزغاية	20,268
32	Ain Merane (Aïn Merane, Ain Merrane)	عين مران	37,142
33	Oum Drou	أم الذروع	17,314
34	Breira	بريرة	11,808
35	Beni Bouateb (Beni Bouattab)	بنى بوعتاب	2,551
