= Sidi Akkacha =

Sidi Akkacha سيدى عكاشة
- Commune and town
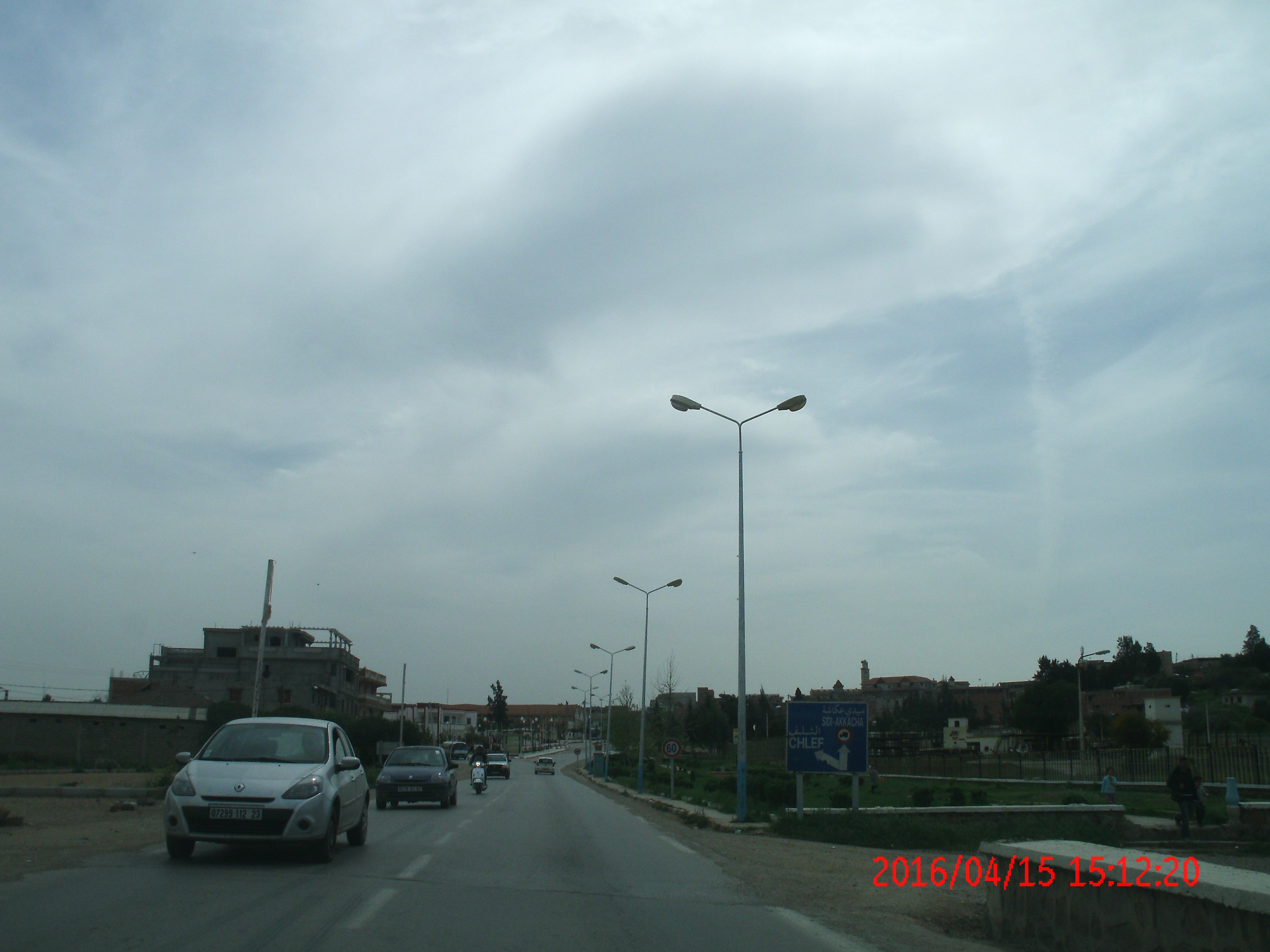

- Location within Algeria
- Country: Algeria
- Province: Chlef Province
- District: Ténès

Population (2008)
  - Total: 26,595
- Time zone: UTC+1 (CET)

Sidi Akkacha is a town and commune in Chlef Province, Algeria. According to the 1998 census, it had a population of 23,374.
