= Abou El Hassan District =

Abou El Hassan District دائرة أبو الحسن دائرة أبو الحسن
- District
- Country: Algeria
- Province: Chlef Province

Population (2008)
  - Total: 67,344
- Time zone: UTC+1 (CET)

Abou El Hassan District is a district of Chlef Province, lying situated on the Mediterranean Sea, northern Algeria. The district contains the capital, Abou El Hassan, holding a total population of approximately 20,164 residents according to the 1998 census.

== Communes ==
The district is further divided into 3 communes:

- Abou El Hassen
- Talassa
- Tadjena
