= El Karimia District =

Coordinates: 36°07′N 1°33′E

- District
- Country: Algeria
- Province: Chlef Province

Population (2008)
  - Total: 48,763
- Time zone: UTC+1 (CET)

El Karimia District is a district of Chlef Province, Algeria.

== Communes ==
The district is further divided into 3 communes:

- El Karimia
- Harchoun
- Beni Bouateb.
