= Ouled Farès District =

Ouled Farès Districte دائرة اولاد فارس
- District

- Location within Algeria
- Coordinates: 36°13′56″N 1°14′35″E
- Country: Algeria
- Province: Chlef Province

Population (2008)
  - Total: 121,032
- Time zone: UTC+1 (CET)

Ouled Farès District is a district of Chlef Province, Algeria.

== Communes ==
The district is further divided into 3 communes:

- Ouled Fares
- Chettia
- Labiod Medjadja
