= Beni Haoua =

Beni Haoua بني حواء
- Commune and town
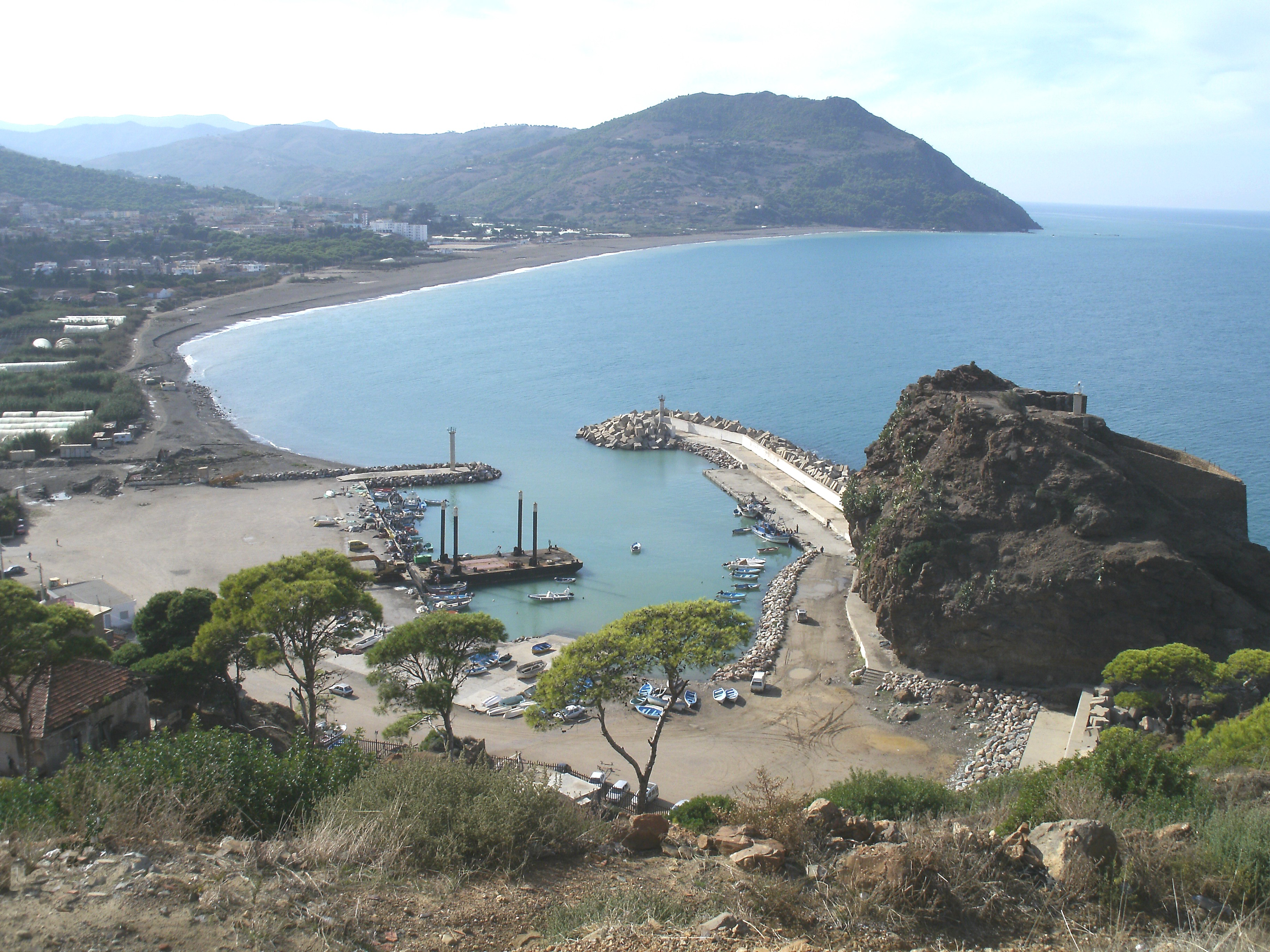
- Beni Haoua

- Location within Algeria
- Coordinates: 36.32°N 1.34°E
- Country: Algeria
- Province: Chlef Province
- District: Beni Haoua District

Population (2008)
  - Total: 20,853
- Time zone: UTC+1 (CET)

Beni Haoua (Arabic: بني حواء،, romanized: beni ħawāʔ, locally بنيحوة, "bniħuwwa") is a town and commune in Chlef Province, Algeria. According to the 1998 census it has a population of 17,602. From 1911 to 1962, the town was known as Francis Garnier, after the French officer, inspector of Indigenous Affairs of Cochinchina and explorer, Francis Garnier.
