= Beni Rached, Chlef =

Beni Rached بنى راشد
- Commune and town

- Location within Algeria
- Coordinates: 36°16′50″N 1°30′57″E
- Country: Algeria
- Province: Chlef Province
- District: Oued Fodda

Population (2008)
  - Total: 23,449
- Time zone: UTC+1 (CET)

Beni Rached, Chlef is a town and commune in Chlef Province, Algeria. According to the 1998 census it has a population of 21,069.
