= Breira, Algeria =

Coordinates: 36°26′55″N 1°36′55″E

- Commune and town
- Country: Algeria
- Province: Chlef Province
- District: Beni Haoua

Population (2008)
  - Total: 13,200
- Time zone: UTC+1 (CET)

Breira, Algeria is a town and commune in Chlef Province, Algeria. According to the 1998 census it has a population of 11,808.
