= P. N. C. Menon =

Indian-Omani businessman (born 1948)

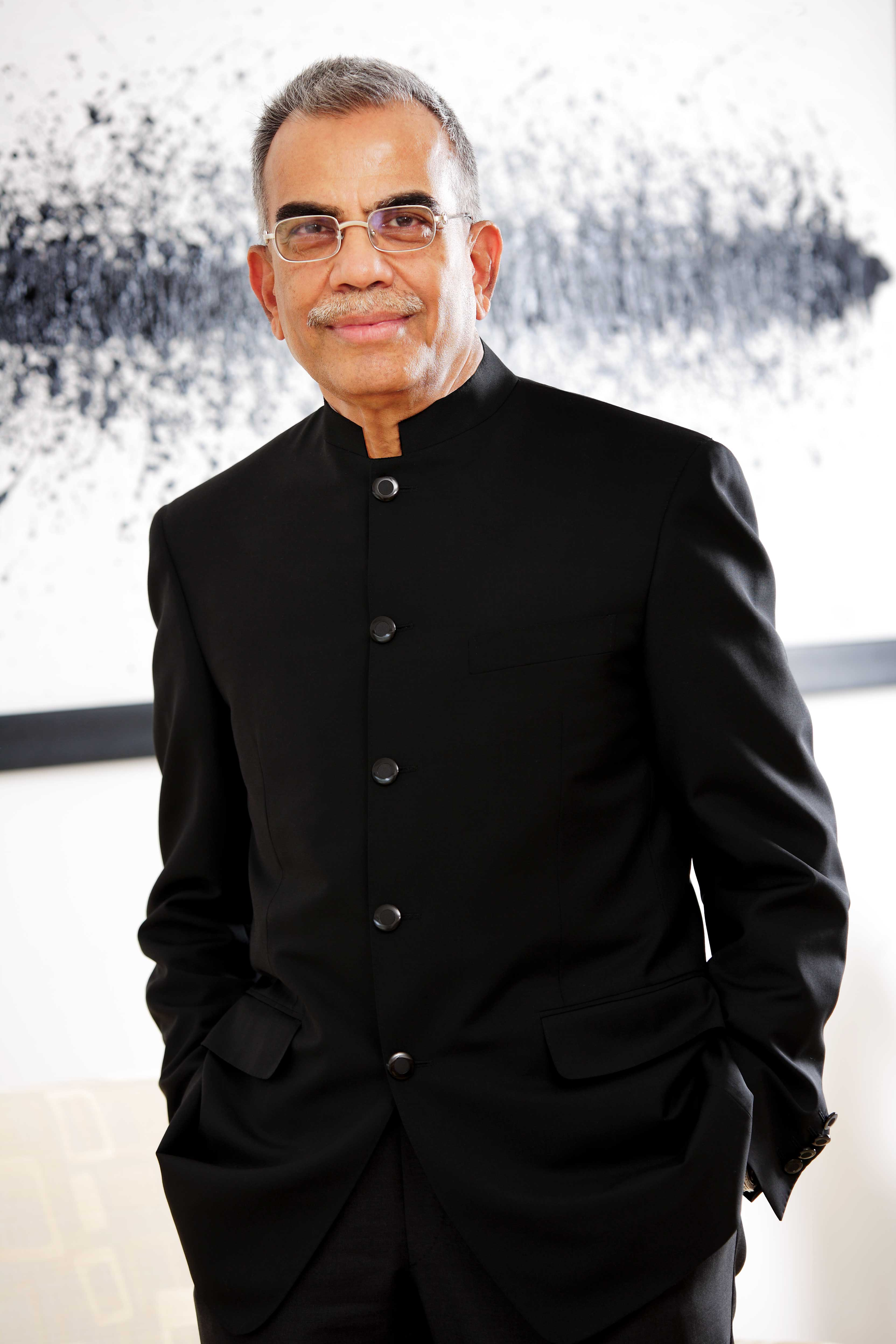
- Menon in 2011
- Born: 17 November 1948 (age 77); Vadakkencherry, Malabar District, Madras Presidency, Dominion of India (present day Palakkad, Kerala, India)
- Education: Sree Kerala Varma College, Thrissur
- Occupation: Business
- Employer: Founder of Sobha Ltd.
- Spouse: Sobha
- Children: 3

Puthan Naduvakkatt Chenthamaraksha Menon, also known as P.N.C. Menon (born 17 November 1948) is an Omani billionaire businessman of Indian origin, born in Palakkad, Kerala. He is the founder and chairman of Sobha Ltd (Formerly Sobha Developers Ltd)& Sobha LLC.

== Early life ==
P. N. C. Menon was born on 17 November 1948 in the Puthan Naduvakkatt house. He grew up and studied in Thrissur, Kerala, where his father was doing business. At the age of 10, he lost his father and had to shoulder the responsibility of providing for his family. Financial struggles forced him to abandon his studies after primary education. He dropped out of Sree Kerala Varma College, Thrissur, to launch an interior decoration business without completing his education.

== Biography ==
At the age of 26, he left Kerala for Oman, where over the years he developed his interior decoration business into a profitable venture. In 1995, he started Sobha Ltd. in Bangalore named after his wife. He is married to Sobha and they have three children: two daughters, Bindu and Revathi, and one son Ravi Menon.

The turning point in his career came in the 1990s when Menon identified the opportunities and potential in the real estate sector. He contributed towards building iconic structures like Oman's Sultan Qaboos Grand Mosque and Al Bustan Palace.

In 2009, he was honoured with the Pravasi Bharatiya Samman by the President of India.

Menon is a billionaire, making him one of the richest people in Oman and also in India with an estimated net worth of US$3.6 billion as of October 2025.

== Philanthropy ==
P. N. C. Menon established the Sri Kurumba Educational & Charitable Trust in 1994, a year before he founded Sobha Developers. The trust adopted Vadakkencherry and Kizhakkancherry - two Panchayats each consisting of 2 villages in Palakkad district, Kerala, his native state, in 2006. In the adopted villages, the trust helps families with very low monthly income and provides education to children from 2,500 poor families (about 11,000 people).

In 2016, Menon and his wife Sobha joined The Giving Pledge list a philanthropic initiative started by Warren Buffett, former Microsoft chairman Bill Gates and his then-wife Melinda.

In February 2024, Menon contributed INR 110 million (USD 1.3M) to the BAPS Hindu Mandir in Abu Dhabi, UAE with the aim to support the ongoing construction and upkeep of the temple, marking a significant milestone in the project.

== Awards and honours ==
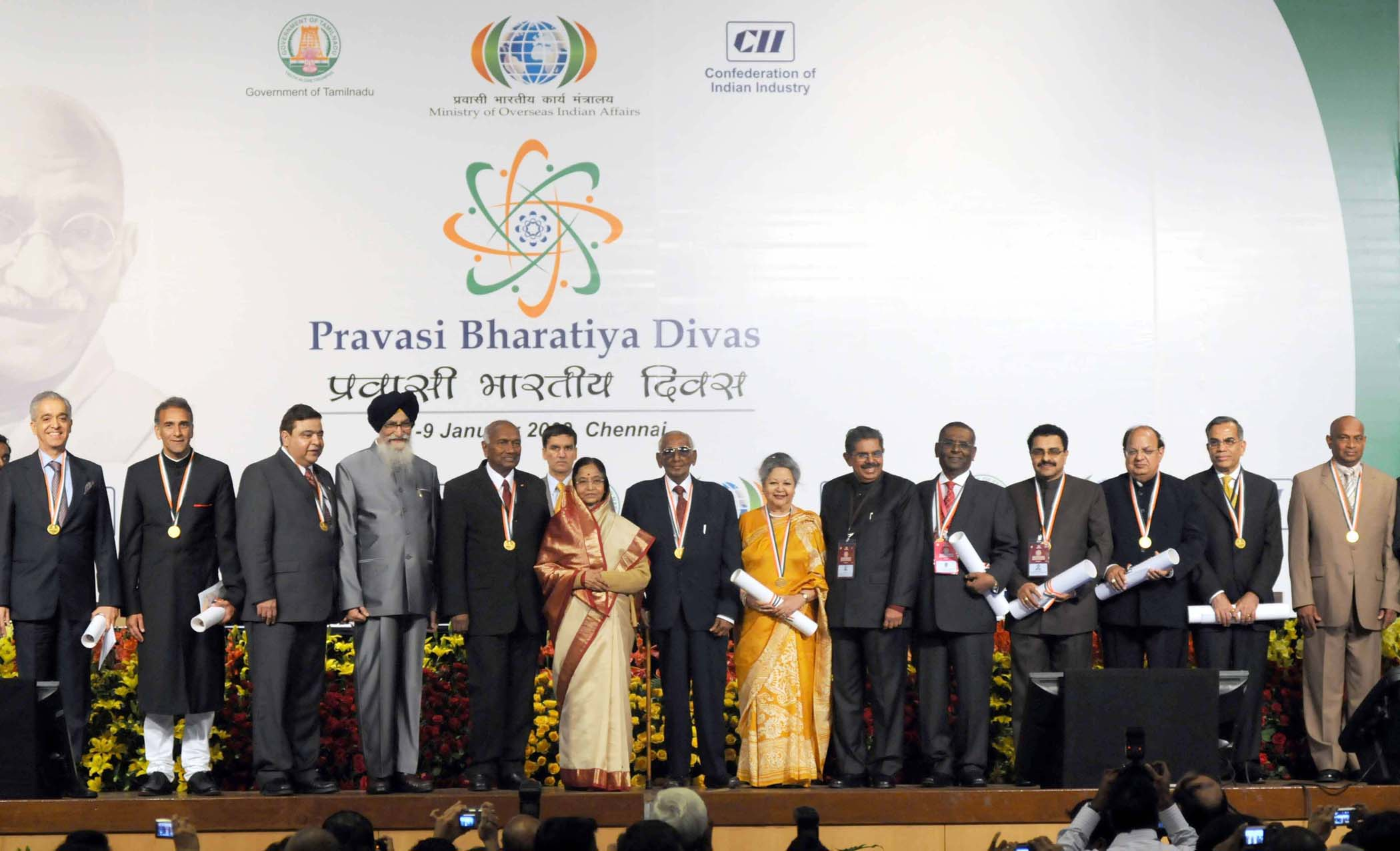
Menon (2nd from right), other awardees stand along with President of India at award ceremony of Pravasi Bharatiya Samman

- 2015: Arabian Indian Czar Award from News Channel Times Now
- 2015: Management Leadership Excellence Award from Calicut Management Association
- 2014: Golden Peacock Lifetime Achievement Award for Business Leadership from Golden Peacock Awards
- 2014: Dhanam Lifetime Achievement Award from Business Magazine Dhanam
- 2014: Featured among top businessmen on Faces of UAE PNC Menon (formerly Faces of Dubai)
- 2014: Excellence in Business Award for corporate Social Responsibility by The Times of India
- 2013: Business Man of the Year from State Forum of Bankers Clubs Kerala
- 2013: 4th Rank in Top 100 Indians in UAE by Forbes
- 2013: Lifetime Achievement Award, from NDTV
- 2012: Special Recognition for "Dedicated Service to Civil Engineering and the Construction Industry" - Civil-Aid Techno Clinic Pvt. Ltd.
- 2009: Pravasi Bharatiya Samman, by the Government of India
