= Ouled Farès =

Ouled Fares اولاد فارس
- Commune and town
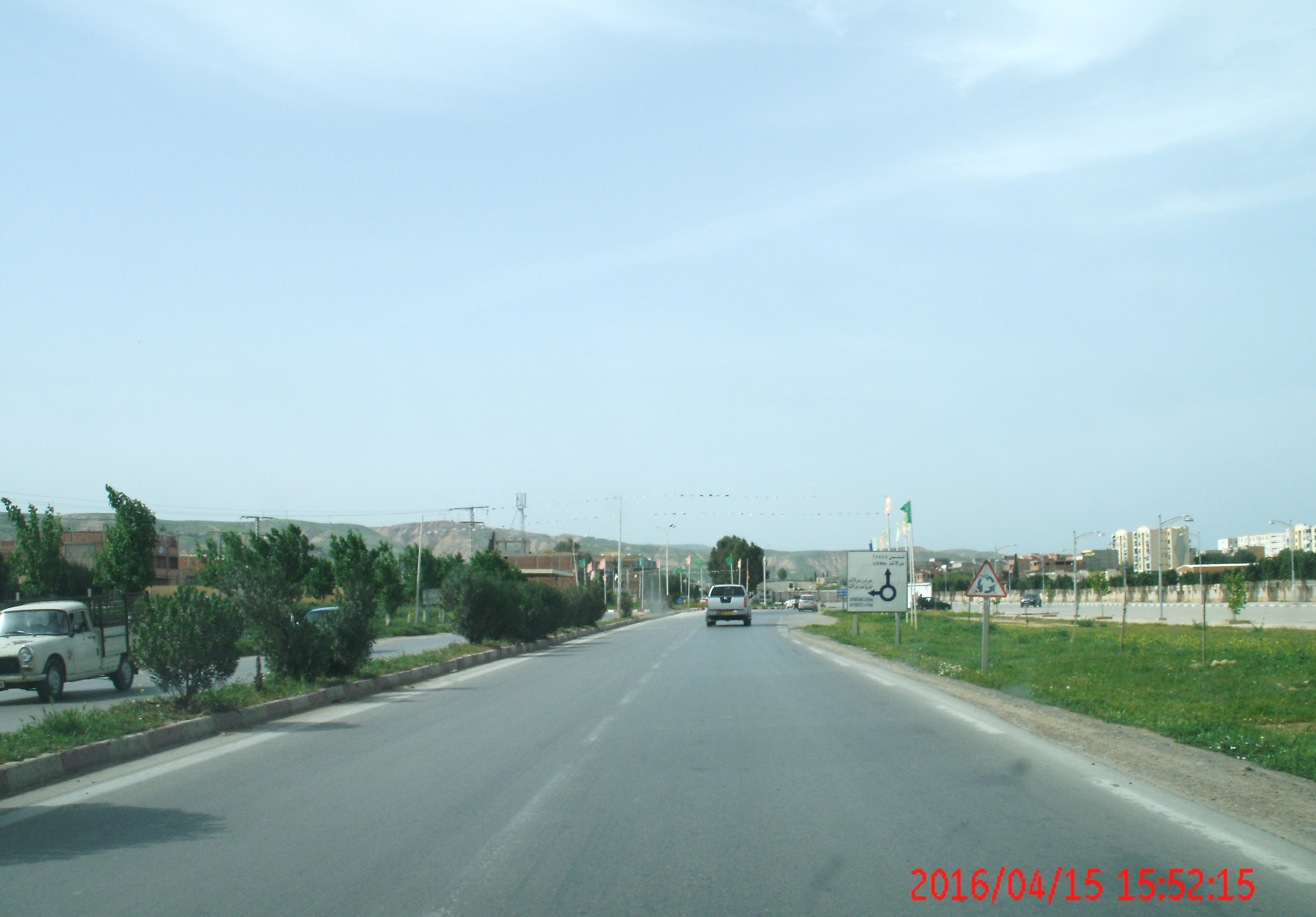

- Location within Algeria
- Country: Algeria
- Province: Chlef Province
- District: Ouled Farès

Population (2008)
  - Total: 34,891
- Time zone: UTC+1 (CET)

Ouled Fares is a town and commune in Chlef Province, Algeria. According to the 1998 census it has a population of 30,068.
