= Oum Drou =

Coordinates: 36°12′N 1°23′E

Oum Drou أم الذروع
- Commune and town
- Location of the commune in the Chlef Province.
- Country: Algeria
- Province: Chlef
- District: Chlef

Population (2008)
  - Total: 21,326
- Time zone: UTC+1 (CET)

Oum Drou is a town and commune in Chlef Province, Algeria. The 1998 census recorded it as having a population of 17,314.
