= Ouled Abbes =

Town and commune in Chlef Province, Algeria

Coordinates: 36°13′N 1°29′E

- Commune and town
- Country: Algeria
- Province: Chlef Province
- District: Oued Fodda

Population (2008)
  - Total: 8 578
- Time zone: UTC+1 (CET)

Ouled Abbes is a town and commune in Chlef Province, Algeria. According to the 1998 census it has a population of 7,330.
