= Fromentin =

Fromentin may refer to:

- Eligius Fromentin (circa 1767–1822), American politician
- Eugène Fromentin (1820–1876), French painter and writer
- Jacques Fromentin (1754–1830), French general of the French Revolutionary Wars
- Fromentin, Chlef, Algeria
