= Ténès District =

Coordinates: 36.5122°N 1.3044°E

Ténès District دائرة تنس
- District
- Country: Algeria
- Province: Chlef Province

Population (2008)
  - Total: 66,403
- Time zone: UTC+1 (CET)

Ténès District is a district of Chlef Province, Algeria.

== Communes ==
The district is further divided into 3 communes:

- Ténès
- Sidi Akkacha
- Sidi Abderrahmane.
