= El Marsa District =

Coordinates: 36.401579°N 0.916586°E

- District
- Country: Algeria
- Province: Chlef Province
- Time zone: UTC+1 (CET)

El Marsa District is a district of Chlef Province, Algeria.

== Communes ==
The district is further divided into 2 communes:

- El Marsa
- Moussadek
