= El Marsa, Chlef =

- Commune and town
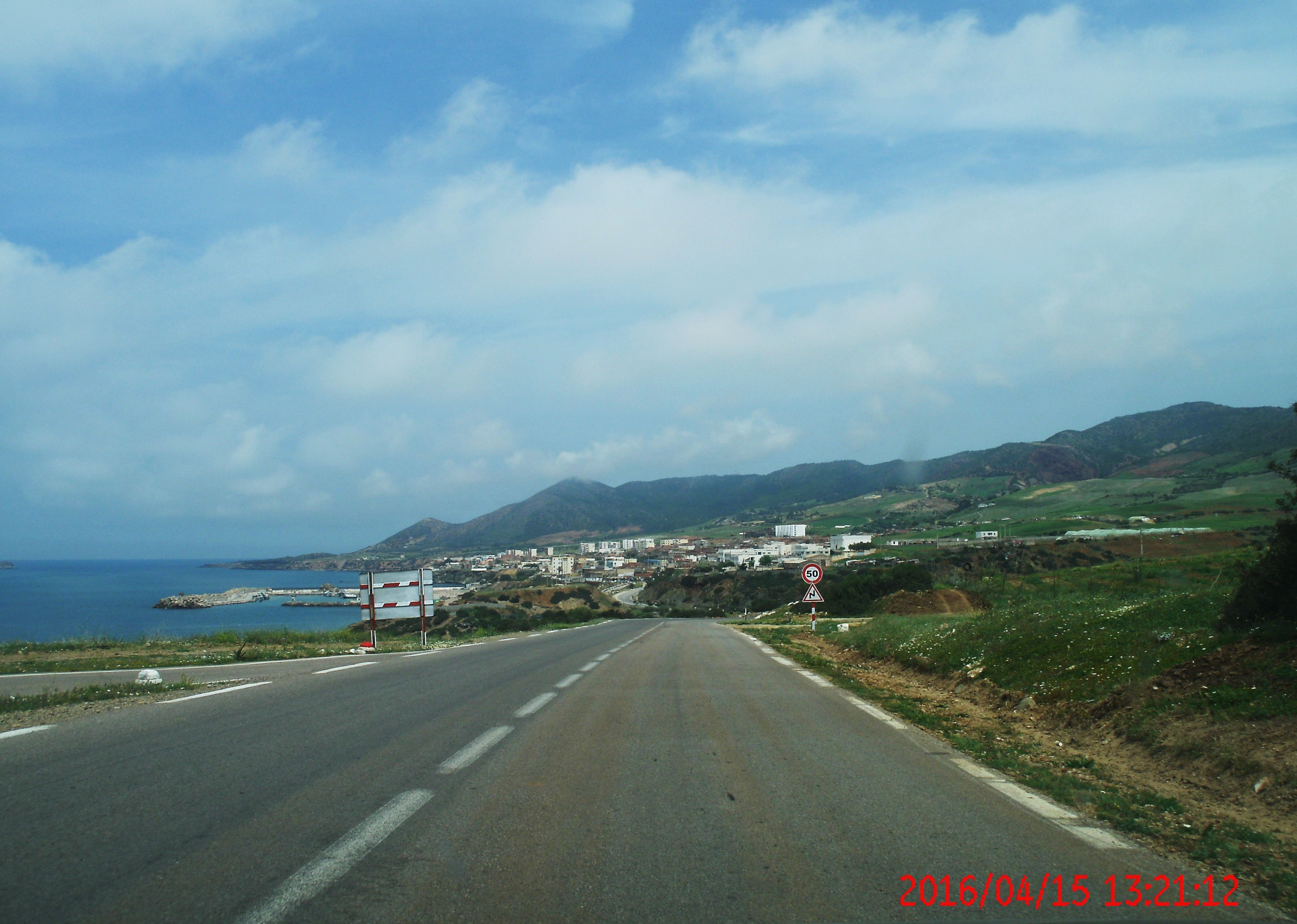

- Location of the commune in the Chlef Province.

- Location within Algeria
- Country: Algeria
- Province: Chlef Province
- District: El Marsa

Population (2008)
  - Total: 10,807
- Time zone: UTC+1 (CET)

El Marsa, Chlef is a town and commune in Chlef Province, Algeria. According to the 1998 census it has a population of 9,726.
