= Ouled Ben Abdelkader =

- Commune and town

- Location within Algeria
- Country: Algeria
- Province: Chlef Province
- District: Ouled Ben Abdelkader

Population (2008)
  - Total: 28,430
- Time zone: UTC+1 (CET)

Ouled Ben Abdelkader is a town and commune in Chlef Province, Algeria. According to the 1998 census it has a population of 17,385.
