= Taougrit =

Coordinates: 36°15′N 0°55′E

Taougrit تاوقريت
- Commune and town
- Country: Algeria
- Province: Chlef Province
- District: Taougrite

Population (2008)
  - Total: 27,574
- Time zone: UTC+1 (CET)

Taougrit is a town and commune in Chlef Province, Algeria. According to the 1998 census it has a population of 24,267.
