= Harchoun =

- Commune and town
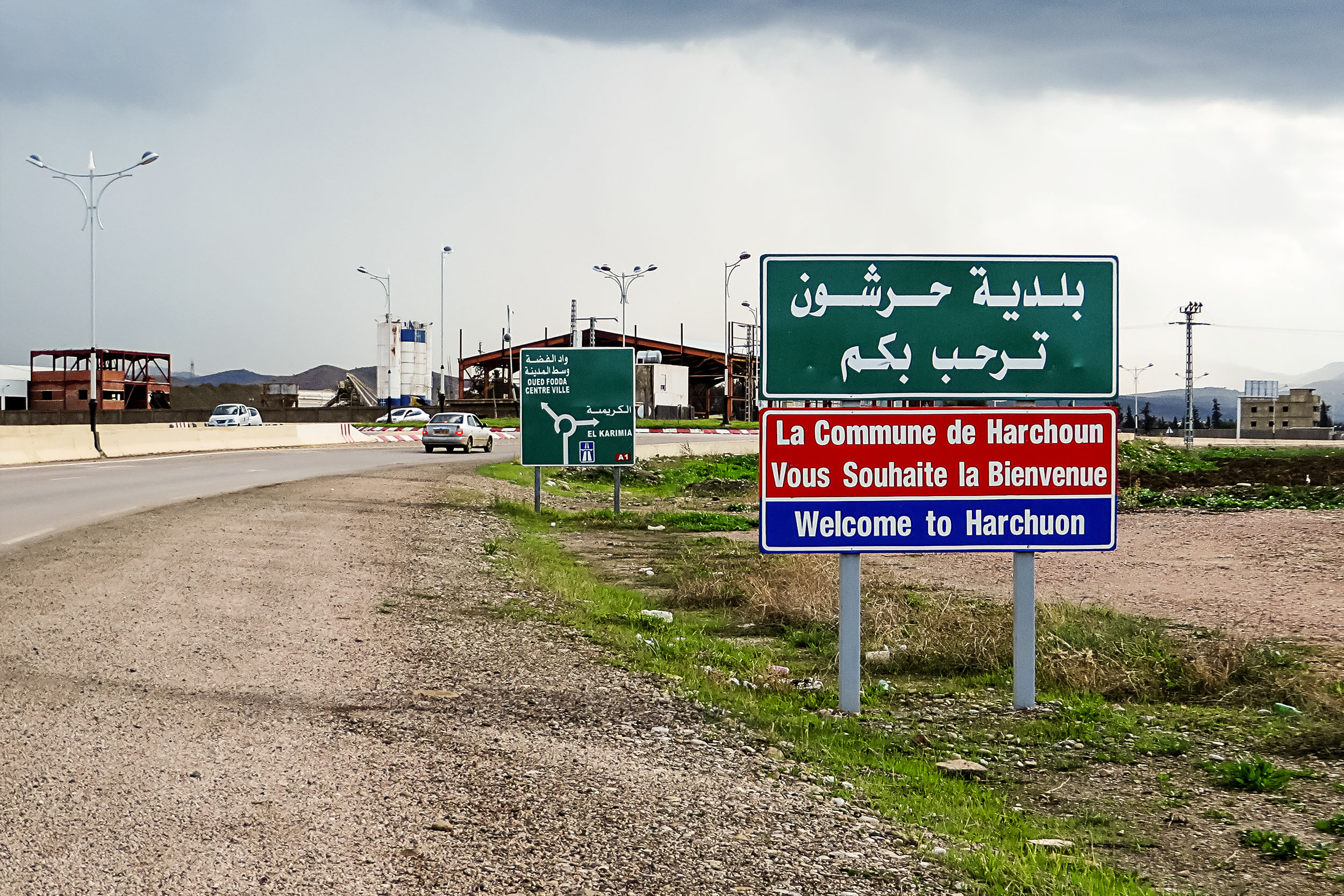

- Location within Algeria
- Country: Algeria
- Province: Chlef Province
- District: El Karimia

Population (1998)
  - Total: 14,869
- Time zone: UTC+1 (CET)

Harchoun is a town and commune in Chlef Province, Algeria. According to the 1998 census it has a population of 14,869.
