= Harenfa =

Coordinates: 36°14′43″N 1°02′45″E

- Commune and town
- Country: Algeria
- Province: Chlef Province
- District: Aïn Merane

Population (2008)
  - Total: 17,799
- Time zone: UTC+1 (CET)

Harenfa is a town and commune in Chlef Province, Algeria.
