= Talassa =

- Commune and town
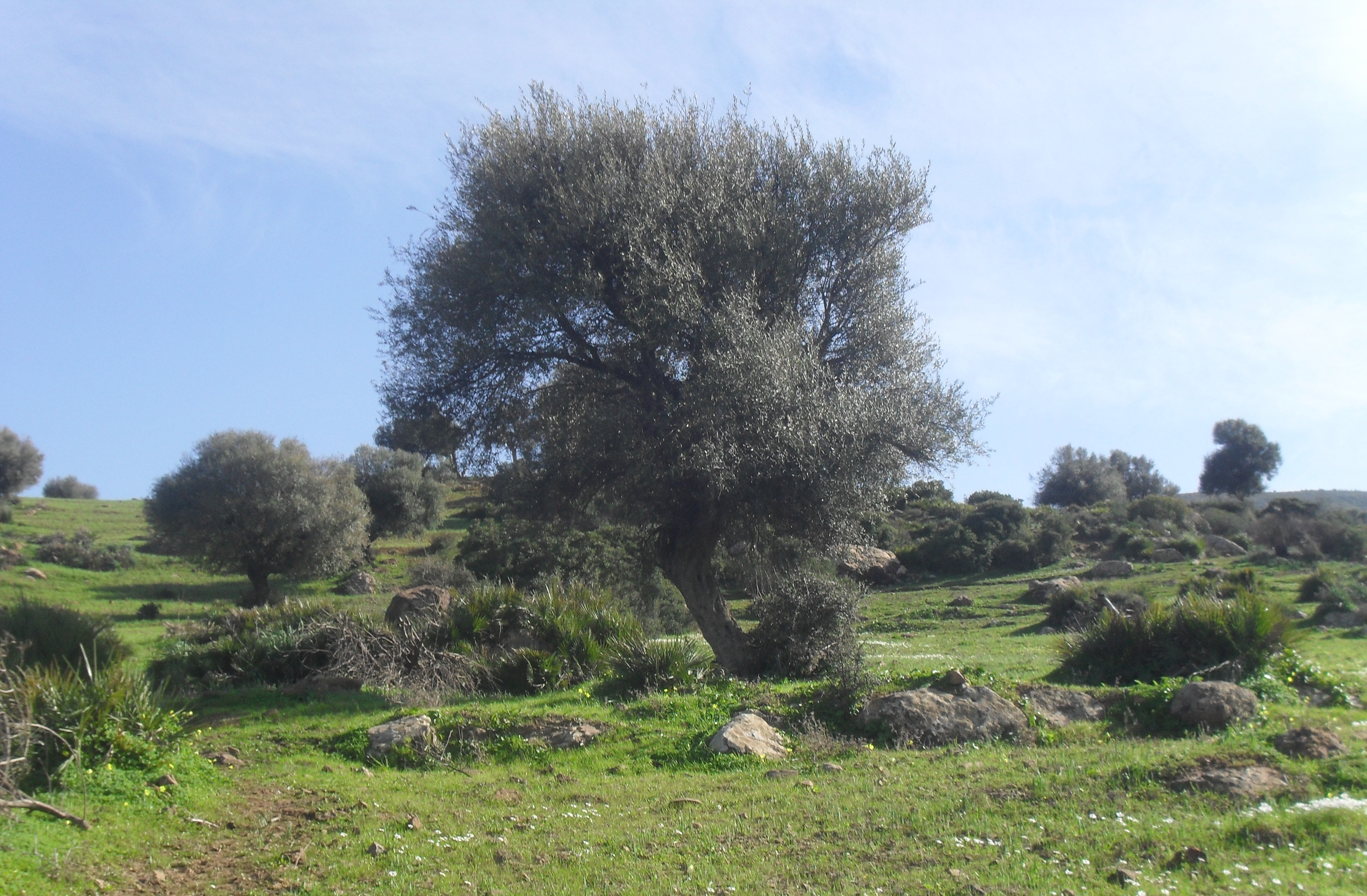

- Location within Algeria
- Country: Algeria
- Province: Chlef Province
- District: Abou El Hassan

Population (1998)
  - Total: 2
- Time zone: UTC+1 (CET)

Talassa is a town and commune in Chlef Province, Algeria.
