= Taougrit District =

Taougrit District دائرة تاوقريت Daïra de Taougrite
- District

- Location within Algeria
- Coordinates: 36.244723°N 0.922852°E
- Country: Algeria
- Province: Chlef Province

Population (2008)
  - Total: 51,376
- Time zone: UTC+1 (CET)

Taougrit District is a district of Chlef Province, Algeria.

== Communes ==
The district is further divided into 2 communes:

- Taougrit
- Dahra
