= Boukadir District =

Coordinates: 36°04′01″N 1°08′00″E

- District
- Country: Algeria
- Province: Chlef Province

Population (2008)
  - Total: 133,043
- Time zone: UTC+1 (CET)

Boukadir District is a district of Chlef Province, Algeria.

== Communes ==
The district is further divided into 3 communes:

- Boukadir
- Oued Sly
- Sobha
