= Beni Bouateb =

Coordinates: 35°59′36″N 1°37′15″E

- Commune and town
- Country: Algeria
- Province: Chlef Province
- District: El Karimia

Population (1998)
  - Total: 2,551
- Time zone: UTC+1 (CET)

Beni Bouateb is a town and commune in Chlef Province, Algeria. According to the 1998 census it has a population of 2551.
