= Beni Haoua District =

Béni Haoua District
- District
- Country: Algeria
- Province: Chlef Province

Population (2008)
  - Total: 50,506
- Time zone: UTC+1 (CET)

Béni Haoua District is a district of Chlef Province, Algeria.

== Communes ==
The district is further divided into 3 communes:

- Béni Haoua
- Breira
- Oued Goussine
