= Boughezoul–Laghouat railway =

Railway line in Algeria

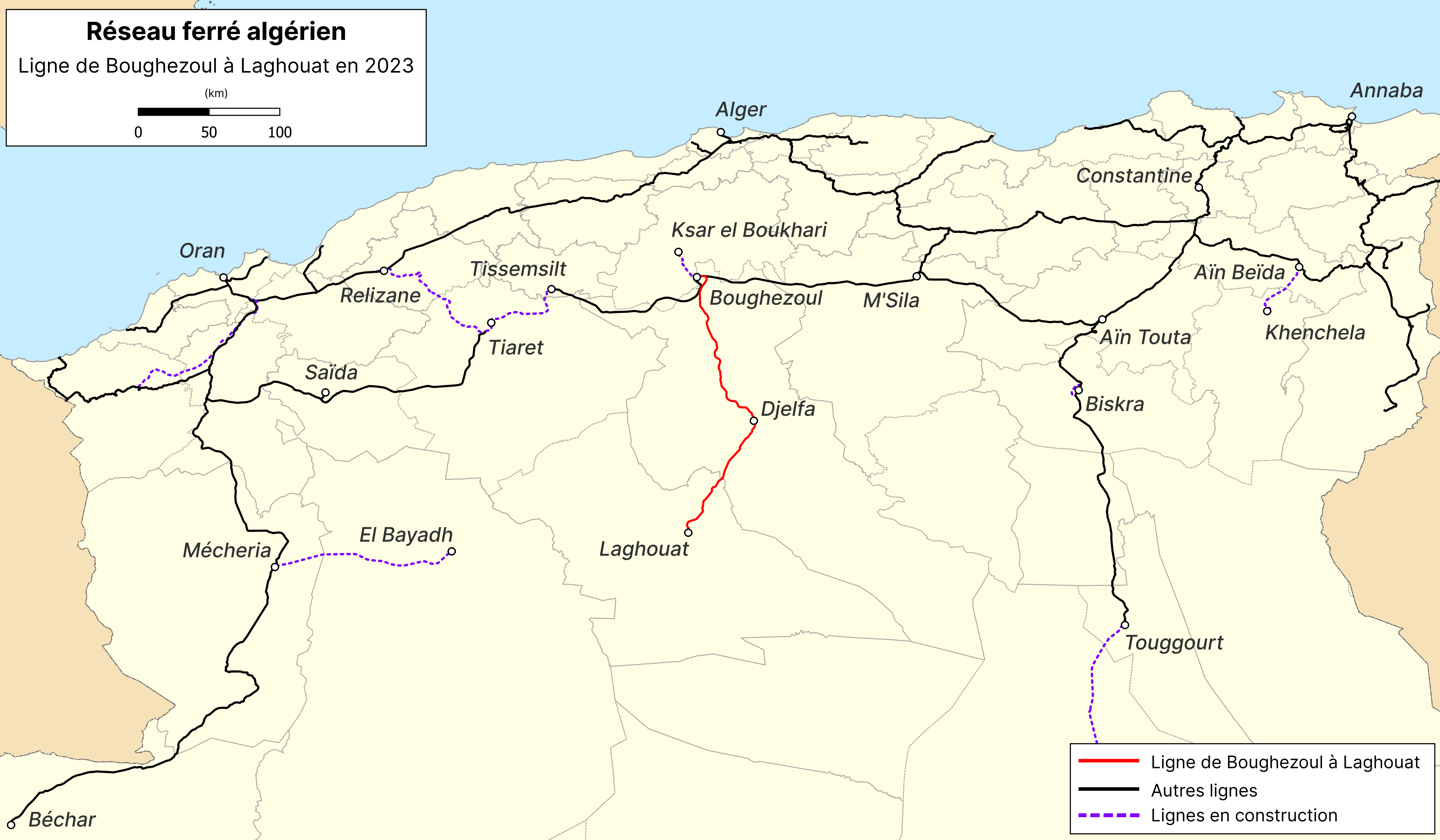

Overview
- Native name: خط بوغزول – الأغواط
- Status: Operating

Service
- Type: Heavy rail
- Operator: SNTF

History
- Opened: 29 October 2023

Technical
- Line length: 250 km (160 mi)
- Num of tracks: Mainly single track
- Track gauge: 1,435 mm (4 ft 8 1/2 in) standard gauge
- Operating speed: 220 km/h (140 mph)

The Boughezoul–Laghouat railway is one of the lines in the Algerian railway network. It was inaugurated in October 2023 and connects Boughezoul (in the Médéa province) to Laghouat (in the Laghouat province).

Stretching for 250 km, the railway is one of the Algerian railway lines known as "penetrating lines". These are a group of three north–south oriented lines that link the stations of the northern artery of Algeria (the lines from Oran to Annaba via Algiers and Constantine) to cities in the northern Algerian Sahara. The Boughezoul-Laghouat line is referred to as the "Central Penetrating Line", with the other two being the Oued Tlelat–Béchar railway and the El Guerrah–Touggourt railway, known as the "Western Penetrating Line" and "Eastern Penetrating Line", respectively.

== History ==
The initial project for the construction of a railway connecting Boughezoul to Laghouat was launched in 2005 by the National Agency for studies and follow up the accomplishment of Railway Investments (ANESRIF). This project was part of a significant railway investment program initiated by the Algerian government, aimed at modernizing existing infrastructure and creating new lines, with a budget of 24.8 billion dollars.

Among the new lines, the construction of three of them (Tissemsilt–Boughezoul, Saida–Tiaret, and Relizane–Tiaret–Tissemsilt) was awarded in 2009 to two Chinese construction groups: China Railway Group (CRG) and China Civil Engineering Construction Corporation (CCECC), for a total amount of 2.5 billion dollars. However, delays in the construction of these three lines, unsuccessful bidding processes due to a lack of competitors or non-compliant bids for other lines, as well as suspicions of corruption in contract awards, led ANESRIF to cancel the contracts and projects associated with the 2005 plan in 2011.

In 2012, ANESRIF revived the projects from 2005. This new plan, comprising thirteen railway projects, included the construction of 643 km of new lines, including the Boughezoul–Laghouat railway, as well as the modernization of 225 km of existing lines

Originally scheduled for completion and inauguration in the first quarter of 2023, the line was finally inaugurated on 29 October 2023, by Algerian President Abdelmadjid Tebboune. The inauguration took place at the new Djelfa station, and the line was put into service on the same day. The first commercial passenger service commenced from the Laghouat station on 31 October 2023.

== Description ==
=== Characteristics ===
The Boughezoul–Laghouat railway spans a distance of 250 km and consists of a single Standard-gauge railway that is not electrified.

Similar to other new or renovated lines in Algeria, the Boughezoul–Laghouat railway is equipped with the ERTMS/ETCS railway signaling systems and the GSM-R communication system. These signaling and communication systems were implemented by ESTEL RA, a joint venture between SNTF (Algerian National Rail Transport Company) and Siemens.

The contract between ANESRIF and ESTEL includes the provision of the following equipment for the line: the ETCS Trainguard 100 ETCS Level 1 system, the Vicos automatic operation control system, the Simis W electronic interlocking system for the six stations along the line, as well as the RailCom communication management system.

=== Route and profile ===
The railway traverses two major geographic regions in northern Algeria from north to south:

- The central part of the Hauts Plateaux, or Algerian steppe, from Boughezoul to Hassi Bahbah.
- The central part of the Saharan Atlas, from Djelfa to Laghouat.

In its passage through the Hauts Plateaux, the line follows a relatively straight alignment without encountering major obstacles to overcome or cross. The second part of the route is more winding as it navigates around the pre-Saharan Atlas mountains (djebels).

The line consists of two sections:

- Boughezoul–Djelfa, covering 140 km, divided into two sub-sections: Boughezoul–Aïn Oussara, spanning 40 km, and Ain Oussera–Djelfa, spanning 100 km.
- Djelfa–Laghouat, covering 110 km.

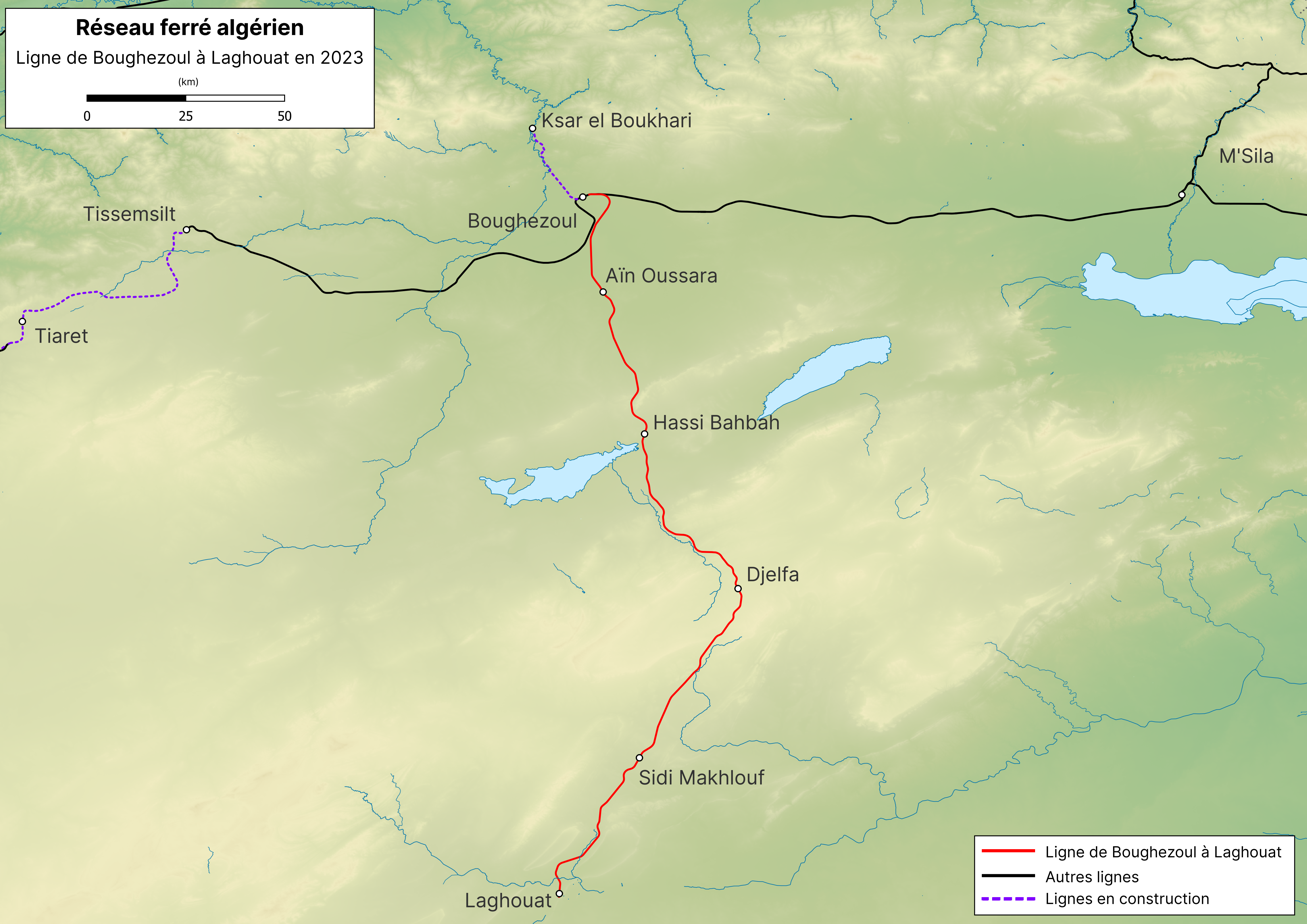
Path of the line in the High Plateaus and the Saharan Atlas.

=== Profile ===
The railway originates from Boughezoul station (PK 0 of the line), situated at an altitude of 652 m in the northern part of the central High Plateaus region. Leaving the station, the line briefly shares its route with the Tissemsilt-M'Sila line for approximately 3 km before taking a north–south orientation that continues until Laghouat.

About 17 km south of Boughezoul, the railway reaches its lowest point, with an altitude of 632 m, at the Dayet el Kerfa depression. As it traverses the southern High Plateaus, the line maintains a consistent slope across the Aïn Oussara plain until it reaches the foothills of the Saharan Atlas. To bypass the El Khaitsar mountain, located near the town of Guelt Es Stel, the line takes a western route, reaching an altitude of 975 m.

Beyond El Khaitsar, the railway enters the Chotts Zahrez Gharbi and Zahrez Chergui depressions, where its altitude decreases to 935 m south of Hassi Bahbah. It then transitions from the High Plateaus to ascending the Ouled Naïl mountains in the central Saharan Atlas. Passing through the Sahari mountain range along the course of the El Melha wadi, the line tunnels through the northeastern edge of the Senalba mountain range before reaching Djelfa. Skirting Djelfa to the east, the line arrives at its new station southeast of the city, situated at an altitude of 1,195 m.

At PK 156, approximately 12 km southwest of Djelfa, the railway reaches its highest point, peaking at 1,274 m while crossing the northeastern tip of the Djellal Chergui mountain near the Caravanes Pass (a road pass on National Highway 1). Descending from the Saharan Atlas, the line follows a lengthy valley for about 90 km, bordered to the northwest by the Djellal Chergui and Milok mountains, and to the southeast by the Zerga, Dahouane, and Dakhla mountains. Exiting this valley, the line leaves the Saharan Atlas behind and enters the northern Algerian Sahara, ultimately reaching Laghouat Station situated southwest of the city at an altitude of 785 m.

Detailed profile of the line.

=== Speeds ===
The maximum speed of passenger trains is 220 km/h, while the speed of freight trains is 100 km/h.

== Services ==
In 2023, the railway is served by six daily trains with a capacity of 380 passengers:

- A round trip from Boughezoul to Laghouat, serving all stations on the line: Boughezoul, Aïn Oussara, Hassi Bahbah, Djelfa, Sidi Makhlouf, and Laghouat.
- Two round trips from Djelfa to Laghouat, serving the stations of Djelfa, Sidi Makhlouf, and Laghouat.

The travel time from Boughezoul to Laghouat is approximately 2 hours and 40 minutes, while the travel time from Djelfa to Laghouat is approximately 45 minutes.

The trains operating the Boughezoul–Laghouat service are Alstom Coradia bi-mode electric and diesel multiple units (class SNTF ZZe).

== Stations ==
The railway includes six passenger stations:

- Boughezoul station (Médéa province);
- Aïn Oussara station (Djelfa province);
- Hassi Bahbah station (Djelfa province);
- Djelfa station (Djelfa province);
- Sidi Makhlouf station (Laghouat province);
- Laghouat station (Laghouat province);

and three freight stations. Djelfa station is a mixed passenger and freight station. The freight stations of Boughezoul and Laghouat are located at a distance from the passenger stations. The storage capacity for goods at each of these three stations is 58,000 m2, with container storage space capable of accommodating 5,500 units.

== Extensions ==
The commissioning of the Boughezoul–Laghouat railway is a step in the realization of the future "Trans-Saharan Central Penetrating Line," a 2,439 km line that will connect Algiers to cities in the Sahara region up to the Algerian-Nigerian border. This link will pass through the provinces of Médéa, Djelfa, Laghouat, Ghardaïa, El Menia, In Salah, and Tamanrasset, and will utilize the following lines:

- From Algiers to Chiffa, 58 km (existing line);
- From Chiffa to Ksar El Boukhari, 111 km (conceptual design studies completed);
- From Ksar El Boukhari to Boughezoul, 40 km (under construction);
- From Boughezoul to Laghouat, 250 km (existing line);
- From Laghouat to Ghardaïa, 250 km (studies completed);
- From Ghardaïa to El Menia, 230 km (studies completed);
- From El Menia to In Salah, 400 km (studies in progress);
- From In Salah to Tamanrasset, 670 km (tender launched in 2022, evaluation of offers ongoing);
- From Tamanrasset to the Niger border, 400 km (studies to be initiated).

Two railway branches will be added to the Central Penetrating Line:

- One towards the northeastern cities of the Sahara, 506 km long; composed of three branches:
  - From Ghardaïa to Hassi Messaoud via Ouargla, 243 km (feasibility studies ongoing);
  - From Hassi Messaoud to Touggourt, 154 km (under construction);
  - From Touggourt to El Oued, 109 km (identification phase completed);
- One towards the northwestern and southwestern cities of the Sahara, 1,500 km long; composed of four branches:
  - From El Menia to Adrar via Timimoun, 570 km (identification phase completed);
  - From Adrar to Bordj Badji Mokhtar, 800 km (study tender launched in 2022);
  - From Bordj Badji Mokhtar to the Algerian-Malian border, 130 km (studies to be planned);
  - From Adrar to Béchar via Béni Abbès, 600 km (identification phase completed).

== See also ==
- List of railway lines in Algeria
