= Oued Fodda District =

Coordinates: 36°11′N 1°32′E

- District
- Country: Algeria
- Province: Chlef Province

Population (2008)
  - Total: 73,737
- Time zone: UTC+1 (CET)

Oued Fodda District is a district of Chlef Province, Algeria.

== Communes ==
The district is further divided into 3 communes:

- Oued Fodda 41 710
- Beni Rached 23 449
- Ouled Abbes 8 578
