= Boughezoul =

Town in Algeria

- Commune and town
- Interactive map of Boughezoul
- Coordinates: 35°41′59″N 2°50′52″E
- Country: Algeria
- Province: Médéa Province
- Elevation: 625 m (2,051 ft)

Population (1998)
  - Total: 14,094
- Time zone: UTC+1 (CET)

Boughezoul is a town and commune in Médéa Province, Algeria. According to the 1998 census, it has a population of 14,094.

The town is slated for building, infrastructural, and population expansions as it is resized and reshaped into a new green city.

== Etymology ==
The name Boughezoul comes from the name of the Berber tribe of the Guezoula. The present word, composed of two lexical units, "bou" and "guezoul", is transcribed differently (Bouguezoul; Boughezoul), due to the phonetic specificities of the languages present and their evolutions, as well as the graphic tradition established since the early Middle Ages, and its conversions into very distinct characters: Arabic/Latin and vice versa. The survival in current oral and written uses of the two forms (Bouguezoul; Boughezoul), is certainly explained by the non-existence of sounds in each of the phonetic systems: (literary) Arabic does not include the consonant "g" and French ignores the "gh", or "ghayn" of the Arabic alphabet.

== Transport ==
=== Rail Transport ===
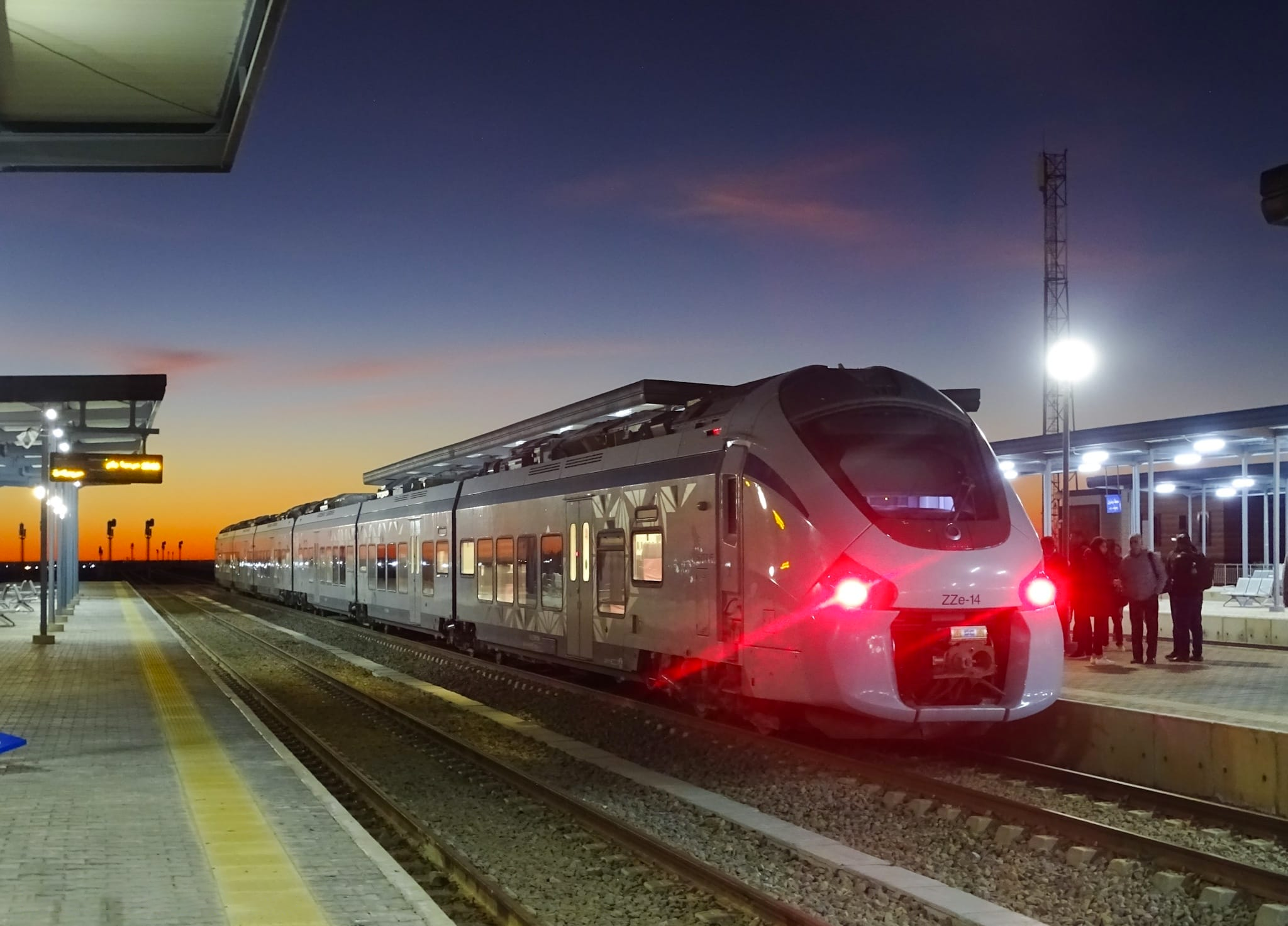
Train station of Boughezoul

Boughezoul Train Station was inaugurated in 2022. It is located in the south of the new city, as close as possible to the current city. The station, located on the Boughezoul to Laghouat line, connects Boughezoul to Laghouat, Tissemsilt, and Bordj Bou Arreridj.

== See also ==
- Boughezoul–Laghouat line
