= Chettia =

Coordinates: 36°10′35″N 1°14′52″E

Chettia الشطية
- Commune and town
- Country: Algeria
- Province: Chlef Province
- District: Ouled Farès

Population (2008)
  - Total: 71,408
- Time zone: UTC+1 (CET)

Chettia is a town and commune in Chlef Province, Algeria. According to the 1998 census it has a population of 59,960.
