= Sobha, Algeria =

Coordinates: 36°06′33″N 1°06′35″E

- Commune and town
- Location of the commune in the Chlef Province.
- Country: Algeria
- Province: Chlef Province
- District: Boukadir

Population (2008)
  - Total: 34,455
- Time zone: UTC+1 (CET)

Sobha, Algeria is a town and commune in Chlef Province, Algeria. According to the 1998 census it has a population of 28,646.
