= Sendjas =

Coordinates: 36°04′N 1°24′E

- Commune and town
- Location of the commune in the Chlef Province.
- Country: Algeria
- Province: Chlef
- District: Chlef

Population (2008)
  - Total: 29,043
- Time zone: UTC+1 (CET)

Sendjas is a town and commune in Chlef Province, Algeria. According to the 1998 census it has a population of 26,228.
