= Chlef =

Chlef الشلف
- City
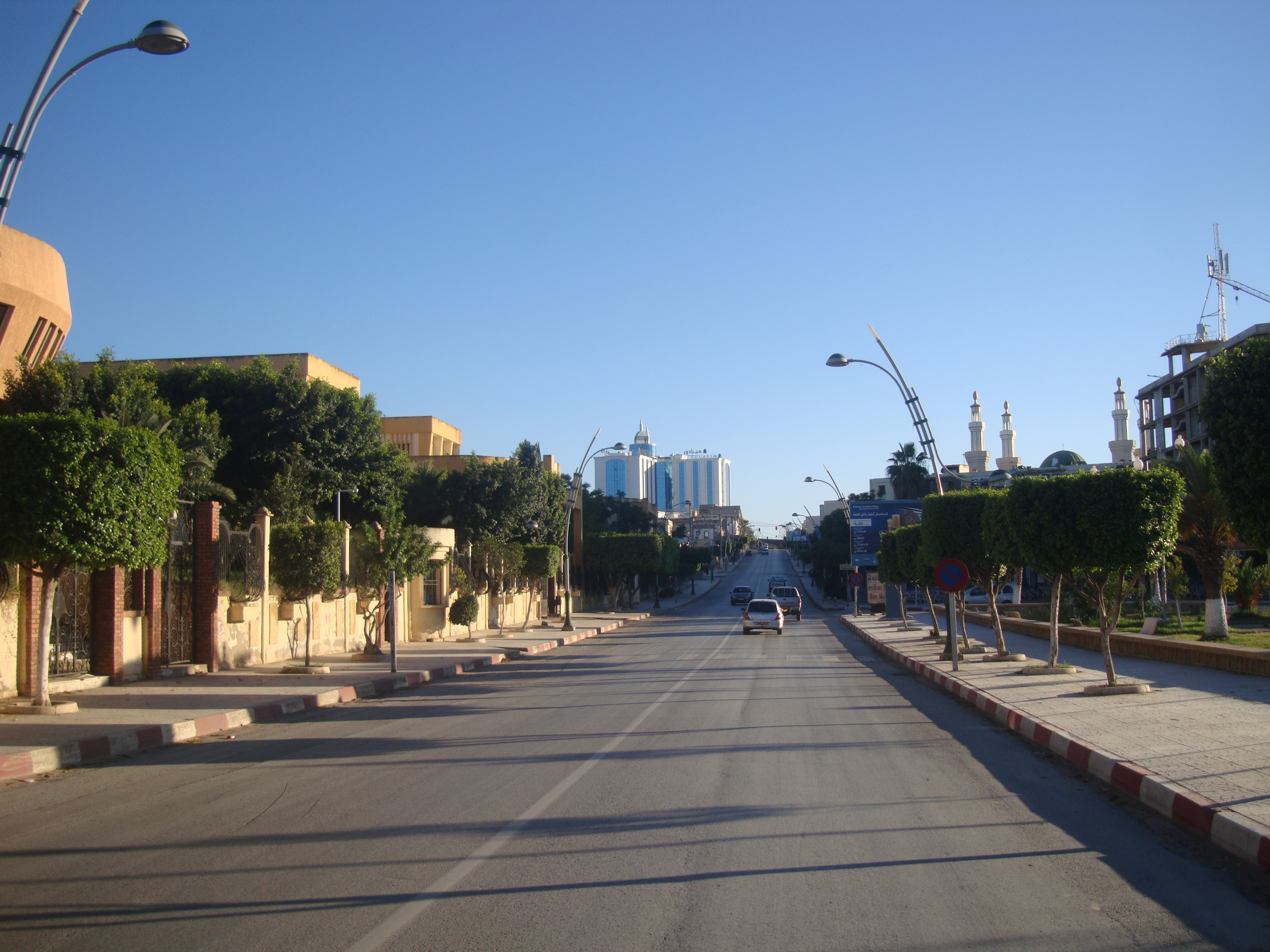
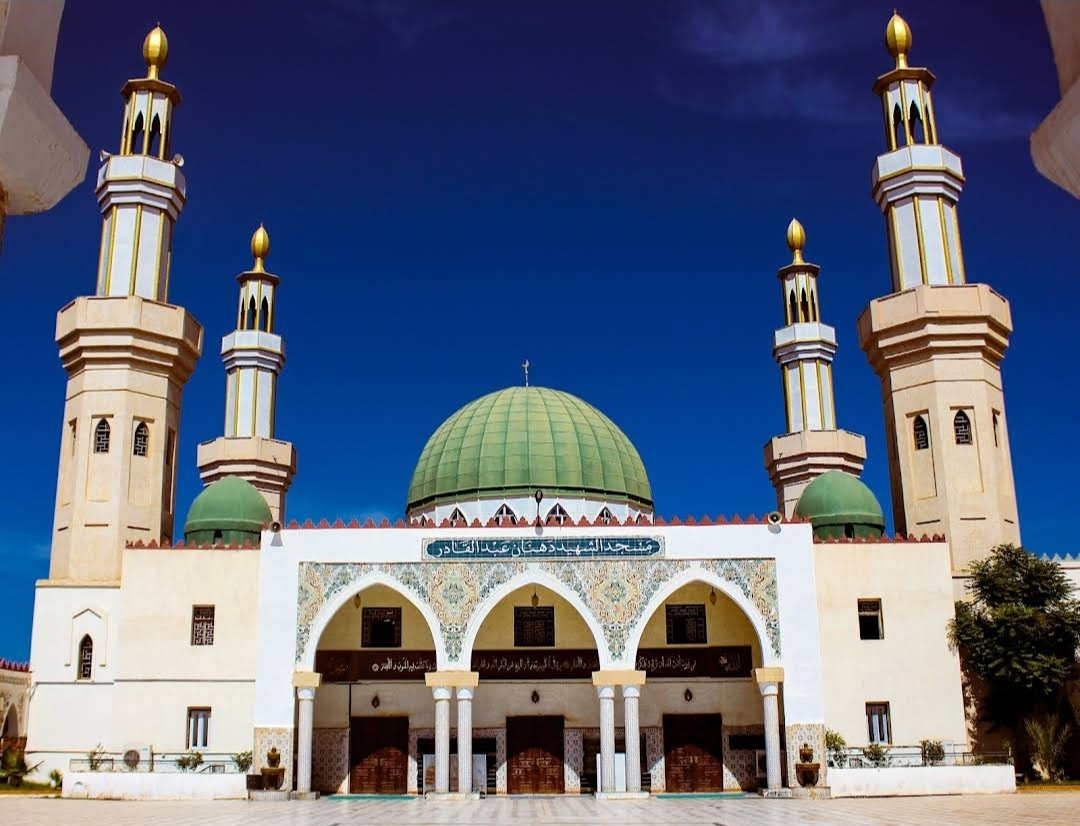
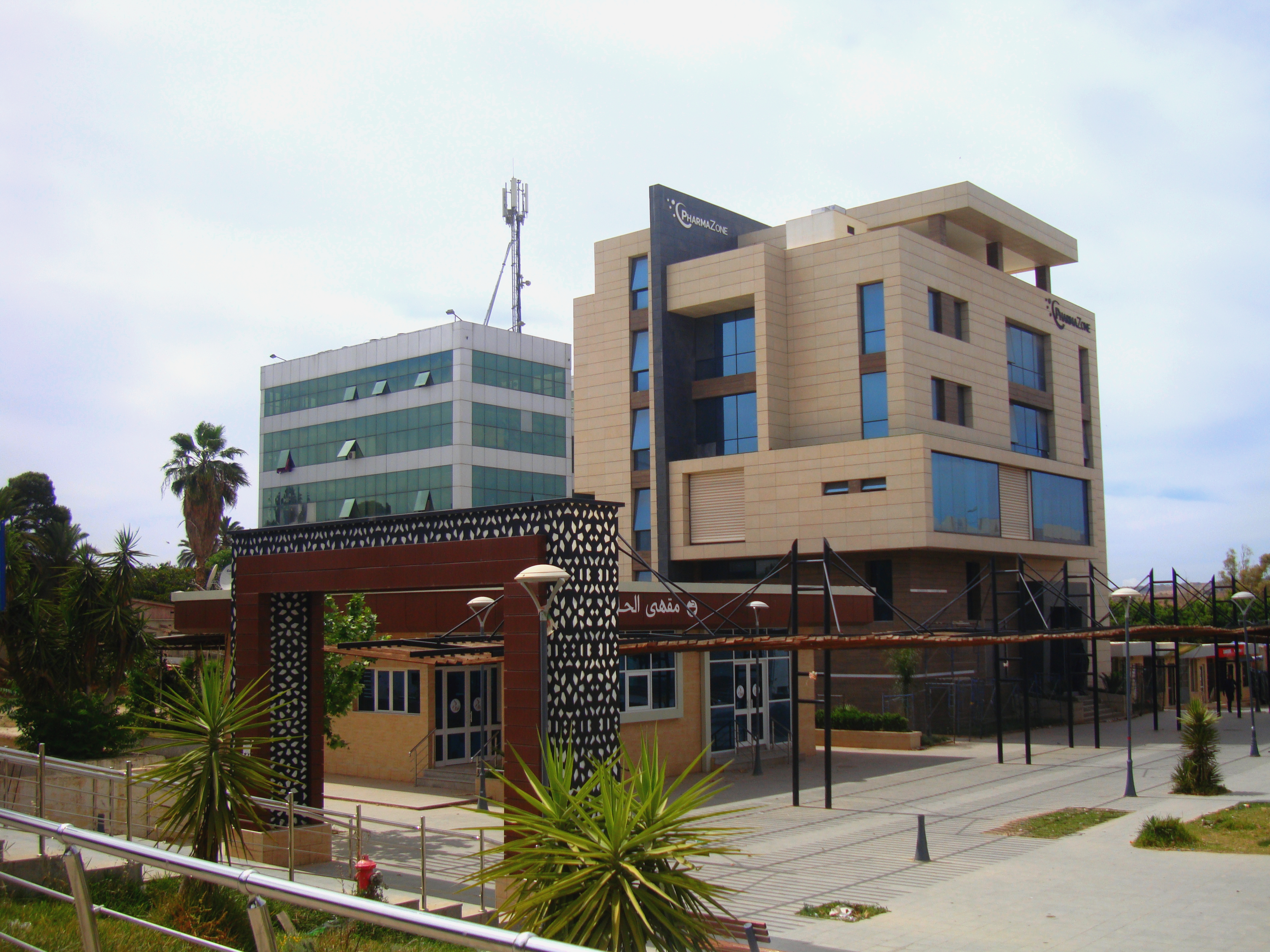
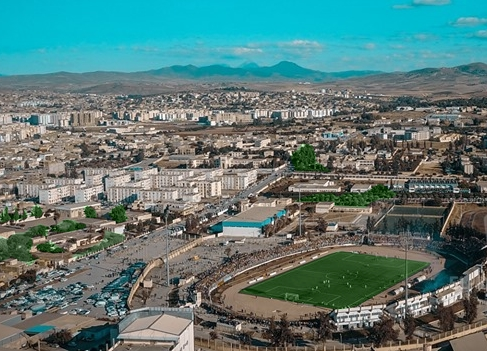
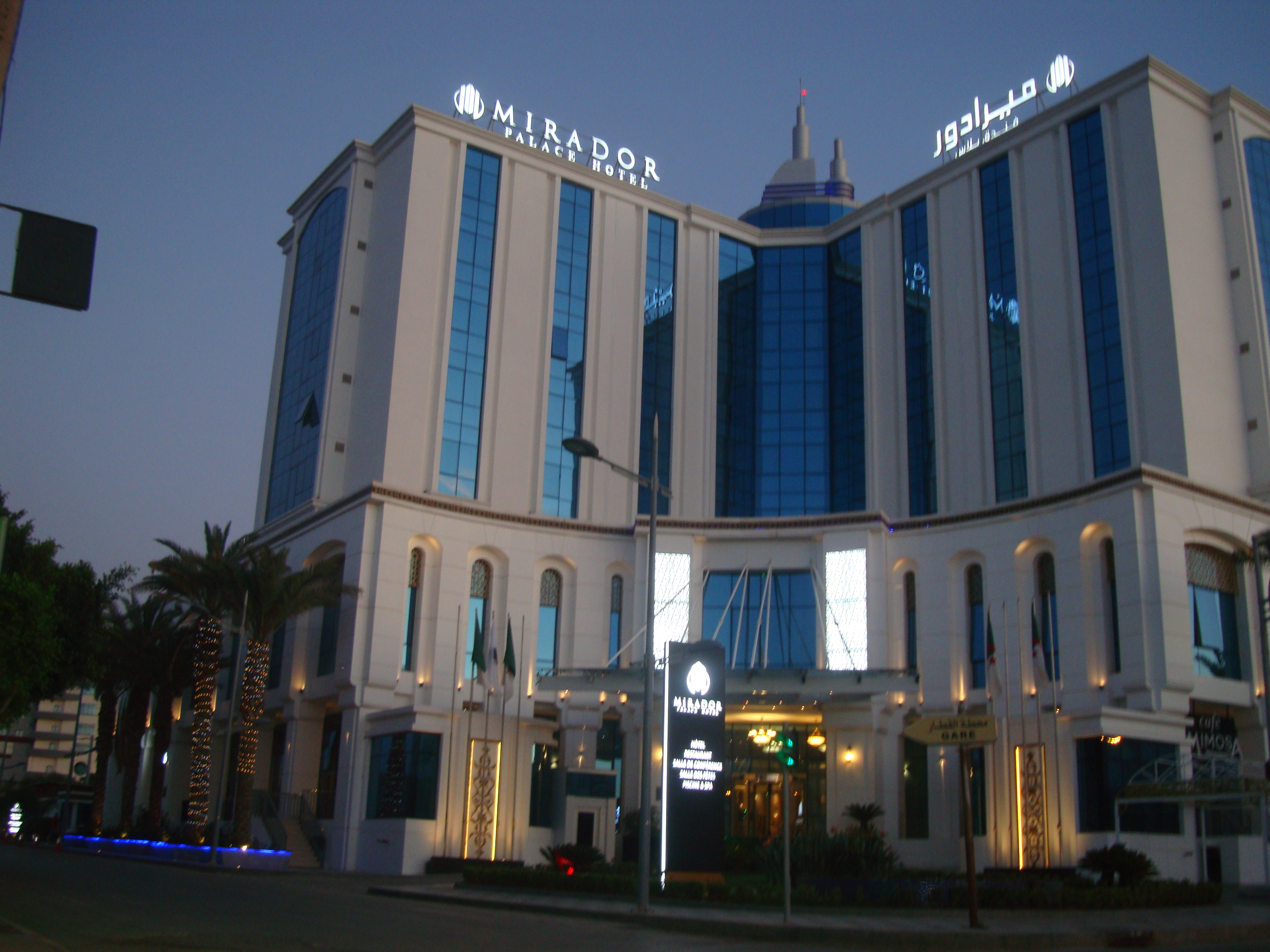
- Abdelhamid Ibn Badis Boulevard Abdelkader Dahnan Mosque Place De La Solidarité Mohamed Boumezrag Stadium Mirador Palace Hotel

- Location of Chlef, Algeria within Chlef Province

- Location within Algeria
- Coordinates: 36°09′53″N 01°19′54″E
- Country: Algeria
- Province: Chlef
- District: Chlef
- Elevation: 114 m (374 ft)

Population (2008)
  - Total: 178,616
- Time zone: UTC+1 (CET)
- Postal code: 02000
- Climate: Csa

Chlef (Arabic: الشلف, romanized: aš-Šalif) is the capital of Chlef Province, Algeria. Located in the north of Algeria, 200 kilometres (120 mi) west of the capital, Algiers, it was founded in 1843, as Orléansville, on the ruins of Roman Castellum Tingitanum. In 1962, it was renamed al-Asnam, but after the devastating earthquake on October 10, 1980, it has borne its present name, Chlef, which is derived from the name of the Chelif River, the longest river in Algeria.

It is home to the soccer club ASO Chlef, the Hassiba Ben Bouali university, and the ruins of the basilica of Reparatus, who was bishop of Castellum Tingitanum from 465 to 475. A corner of the flooring of the basilica contained a mosaic labyrinth, the oldest known example of Christian use of this motif.

== History ==
=== Ancient Castellum Tingitii ===
The Roman citadel, Castellum Tingitanum, was a city of the Roman province of Mauretania Caesariensis. The site became known as Al-Asnam (Arabic for "sculptures") during the Umayyad Caliphate period. It covered an area of 600 by 300 metres (1,970 by 980 feet) and contained many statues.

=== Former bishopric ===
A Christian basilica dating back to the reign of the Emperor Constantine was discovered here, with an elaborate mosaic. This is the oldest church to be found in Africa. The Bishop Felix (Italian: Felice), was among the Catholic prelates summoned to the Council of Carthage (484) by the Arian Vandal king Huneric before he was exiled. No other details are known about the ancient bishopric.

It was revived nominally as a Roman Catholic titular see in 1965, and was filled regularly since.

==== Titular bishops ====
- Agustín Rodríguez (1965.12.07 – 1968.12.25)
- Antonino Nepomuceno, Oblate O.M.I. (1969.07.11 – 1997.02.14)
- Ireneusz Józef Pękalski, Auxiliary Bishop of the Roman Catholic Archdiocese of Łódź (Poland) (1999.12.11 – present)

=== Al-Asnam and the Ouled Kosseir ===
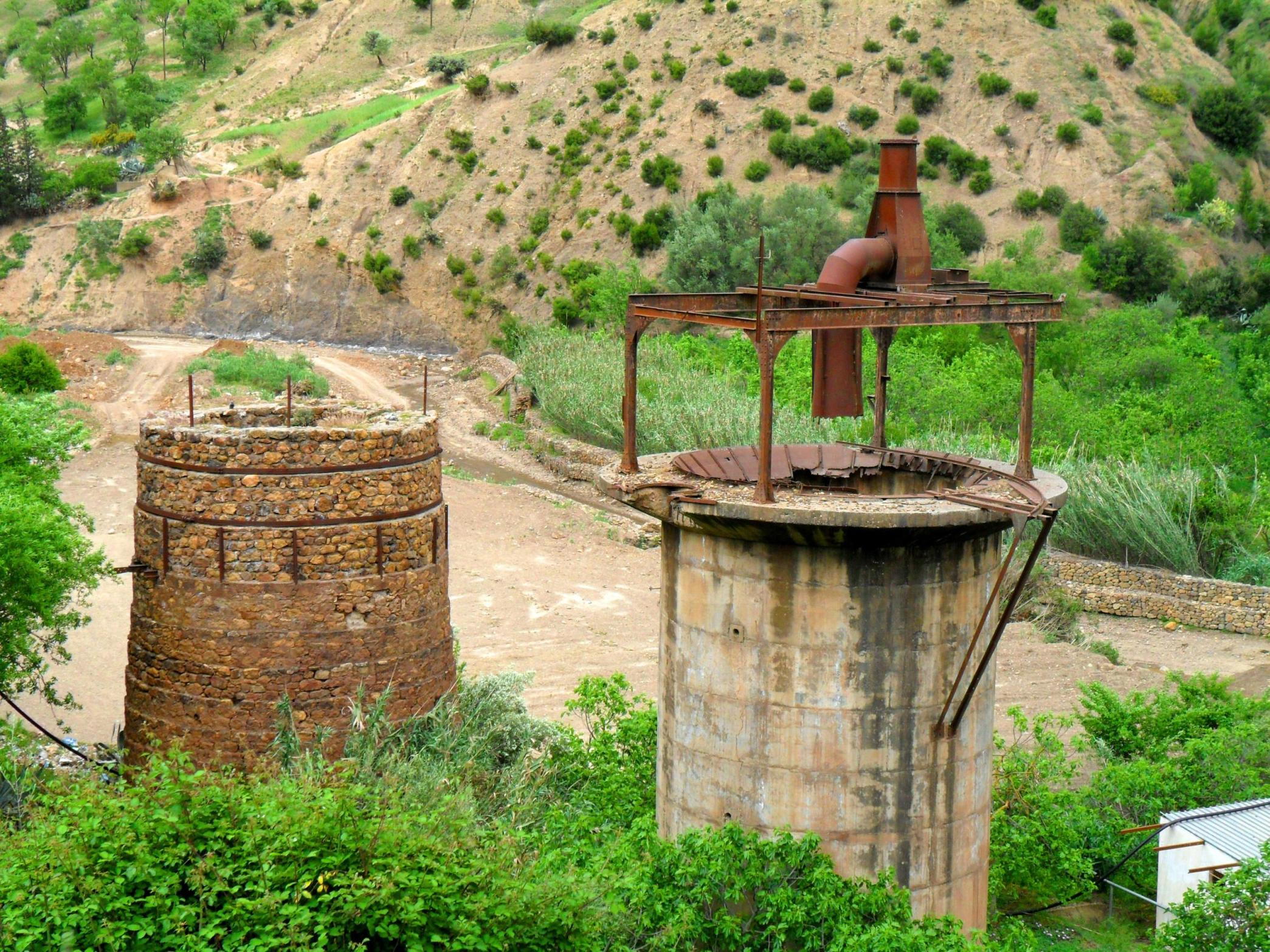
Breira mines

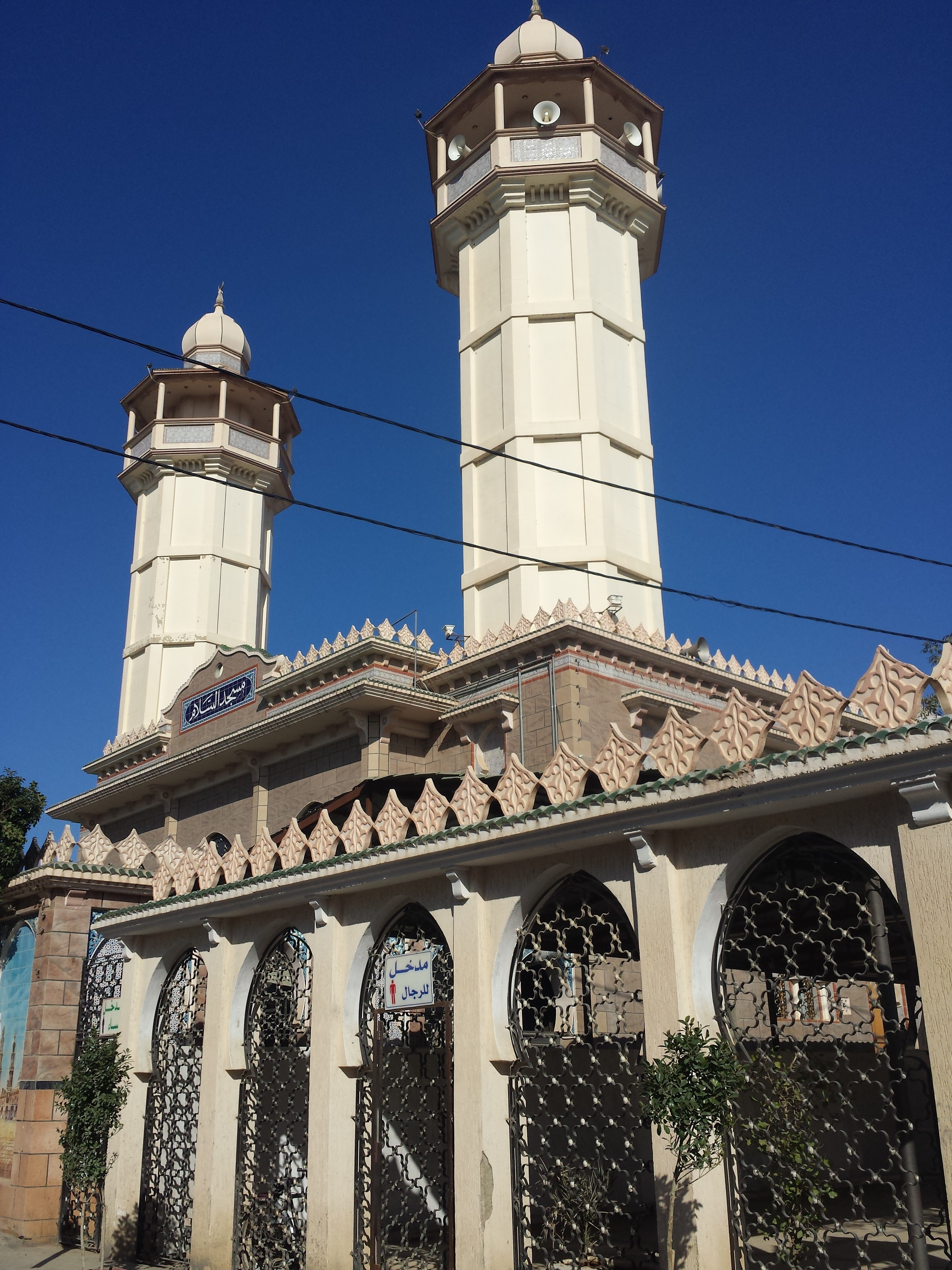
Chlef Mosque

Chellif Valley was from the 15th century the territory of the Bedouin Ouled Kosseir, who settled there under the leadership of Hamou El Kosseir (H'ammü'l-Quççayri) having displaced the indigenous Berber tribes. This tribe is a tribal Djouadi (military nobility). If they even call themselves descendants of the Beni Makhzum (Either Khaled Ibn El Walid). Some historians believe that it belongs to the Confederation of Ibn Suwayd Zoghba of Beni Hillal and therefore cousins of Mehal, other military nobility.

Documents of the French army and other historians speak of "most powerful and wealthy tribes' in the Chellif Valley in 1830, with more than 500,000 hectares of very fertile land and more than 19,000 soldiers. The Ouled Kosseir participated in the moubayâa of the Emir Abdelkader, and their territory was granted under the Treaty of Tafna.

After the defeat of the Emir and his allies, their lands were in large part confiscated and distributed among settlers and other indigenous people, including Medjadja, marabouts who supported the French army on arrival.

The French Administration of Napoleon III, under the "Arab kingdom", tried to honour the leaders of the Ouled Kosseir with Djouadi. As such, some were decorated with the Legion of Honour (or Med Foudad Kharoubi Ben Ben Bia).

The last Kaid (tribal leader) after the arrival of the French army was Foudad Ben Adda, who served during 1867 on the city council of the municipality of Orleansville. He was also a member of the General Council of Algiers until his death in 1869.

=== Orléansville ===
In 1843 Maréchal Bugeaud founded the city of Orléansville at the modern site of Chlef.

The town was located at the confluence of the Chlef River and the Tsighaout River. The town developed due to the harsh climate, one of the hottest in northern Algeria.

The 6.7 M_{w} Chlef earthquake shook northern Algeria on 9 September 1954 with a maximum Mercalli intensity of XI (Extreme). At least 1,243 people were killed and 5,000 were injured.

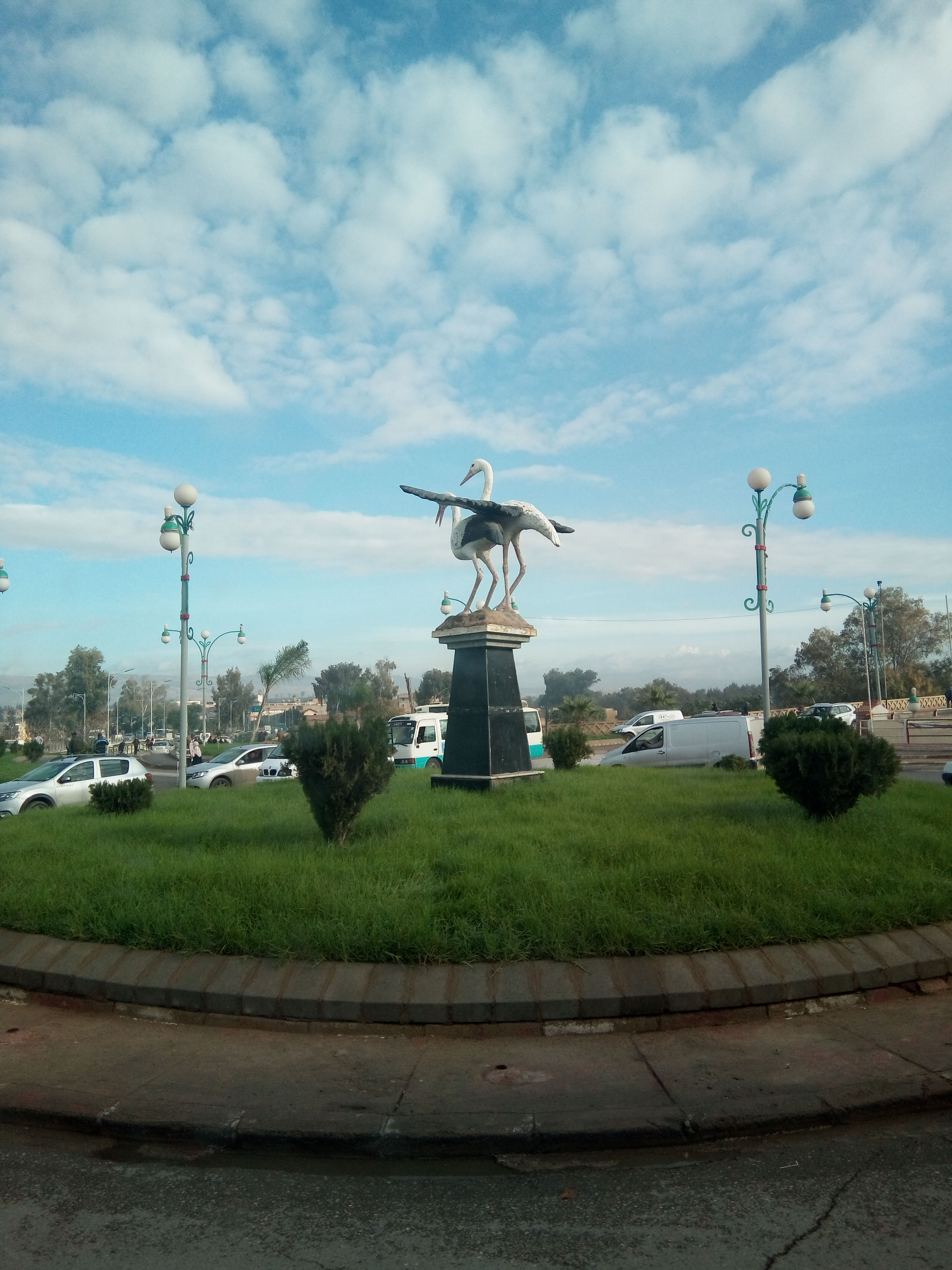

At that time the town had a population of 44,400 inhabitants. It was the home of the Algerian Division of the artistic group Lettrist International (LI), some of whom died in the earthquake. Mohamed Dahou survived and went on to become involved in the Situationist International. The LI described the town as "the most lettrist city in the world".

== Population ==
In the 2018 census the province of Chlef had just over 1 million inhabitants, of which 178,616 were living in the provincial capital Chlef.

== Geography ==
Chlef lies in a valley at an elevation of 114 metres (374 ft) between two ranges of hills to the north and west. The city is surrounded by farmland; there are scattered trees both in the valley and on the hills.

=== Climate ===
Chlef has a hot semi-arid climate (Köppen climate classification BSh) bordering a Mediterranean climate (Csa), with very hot, dry summers and mild, moist winters.

Climate data for Chlef (1991-2020)
Month	Jan	Feb	Mar	Apr	May	Jun	Jul	Aug	Sep	Oct	Nov	Dec	Year
Record high °C (°F)	25.3 (77.5)	30.4 (86.7)	36.0 (96.8)	41.5 (106.7)	43.8 (110.8)	45.7 (114.3)	48.3 (118.9)	46.9 (116.4)	44.0 (111.2)	40.5 (104.9)	32.2 (90.0)	26.0 (78.8)	48.3 (118.9)
Mean daily maximum °C (°F)	15.6 (60.1)	17.3 (63.1)	19.5 (67.1)	22.2 (72.0)	26.9 (80.4)	32.3 (90.1)	37.3 (99.1)	37.1 (98.8)	32.9 (91.2)	26.5 (79.7)	20.2 (68.4)	16.0 (60.8)	25.3 (77.6)
Daily mean °C (°F)	10.6 (51.1)	11.8 (53.2)	13.3 (55.9)	15.9 (60.6)	20.1 (68.2)	24.8 (76.6)	29.0 (84.2)	29.0 (84.2)	25.5 (77.9)	20.3 (68.5)	14.8 (58.6)	11.2 (52.2)	18.9 (65.9)
Mean daily minimum °C (°F)	5.5 (41.9)	6.2 (43.2)	7.1 (44.8)	9.5 (49.1)	13.1 (55.6)	17.3 (63.1)	20.6 (69.1)	20.8 (69.4)	18.1 (64.6)	14.0 (57.2)	9.3 (48.7)	6.3 (43.3)	12.3 (54.2)
Record low °C (°F)	−1.5 (29.3)	−1.5 (29.3)	0.0 (32.0)	1.4 (34.5)	3.6 (38.5)	10.3 (50.5)	15.0 (59.0)	13.4 (56.1)	11.5 (52.7)	6.0 (42.8)	2.0 (35.6)	0.0 (32.0)	−1.5 (29.3)
Average precipitation mm (inches)	52.5 (2.07)	53.5 (2.11)	42.0 (1.65)	45.5 (1.79)	27.8 (1.09)	6.7 (0.26)	1.7 (0.07)	4.1 (0.16)	20.8 (0.82)	31.2 (1.23)	58.1 (2.29)	44.9 (1.77)	388.8 (15.31)
Average precipitation days (≥ 1 mm)	7.5	7.2	6.2	5.8	3.7	1.1	0.4	0.9	2.6	4.2	7.6	6.3	53.5
Source 1: NOAA
Source 2: NOAA (mean temperatures 1961-1990)

== Transportation ==
Chlef has a station on the Algiers-Oran railway line. The city is served by Chlef International Airport.

== Notable people ==
- Hillal Soudani (born 1987), footballer
- Dalila Zerrouki (born 1982), footballer
