= Auguste Rencurel =

French politician

Auguste Rencurel (4 September 1896 – 19 January 1983) was a French politician.

Rencurel was born in Oued Fodda, Algeria. He represented the Radical Party in the Constituent Assembly elected in 1945, in the Constituent Assembly elected in 1946 and in the National Assembly from 1946 to 1951.
