= Sobha (company) =

Indian real estate company

Sobha Limited
- Type: Public
- Traded as: BSE: 532784; NSE: SOBHA
- Industry: Real estate development, construction
- Founder: P. N. C. Menon (Chairman Emeritus)
- Headquarters: Dubai, United Arab Emirates
- Key people: Francis Alfred (Managing Director)
- Revenue: ▼₹4,163 crore (US$430 million) (2025)
- Operating income: ▼₹676.39 crore (US$70 million) (2021)
- Net income: ▼₹95 crore (US$9.9 million) (2025)
- Total assets: ▲₹17,221 crore (US$1.8 billion) (2025)
- Total equity: ▼₹4,561 crore (US$470 million) (2025)
- Number of employees: 4121+ (2024)
- Parent: Sobha Realty
- Website: www.sobha.com

Sobha Limited (formerly Sobha Developers Limited) is a multinational real estate developer with its headquarters in Dubai, United Arab Emirates and a corporate office in Bengaluru, India.

== History ==
Sobha Realty is an international luxury developer. It was established in 1976 as an interior decoration firm in Oman by P. N. C. Menon. The company has developed and invested in projects in the UAE, Oman, Bahrain, Brunei and India.

Sobha Limited was founded on 7 August 1995 by P. N. C. Menon. The company announced an investment of ₹500 crore residential development in GIFT City.

The company changed its name to "Sobha Limited" on 18 August 2014. Internationally, Sobha Ltd has operations running in Oman and Dubai as Sobha Realty.

== Sponsorship ==
In September 2023, Sobha Realty signed a sponsorship deal with Arsenal F.C., with the company securing the naming rights to the premium match day hospitality suite at Emirates Stadium. In February 2024, Sobha Realty became a principal partner of Arsenal, securing the naming rights of the Arsenal Training Centre (as the Sobha Realty Training Centre) and sponsoring the training kit sleeve.
