= Chelif River =

Watercourse in Algeria

Chelif Oued Chelif Wad Sheliff
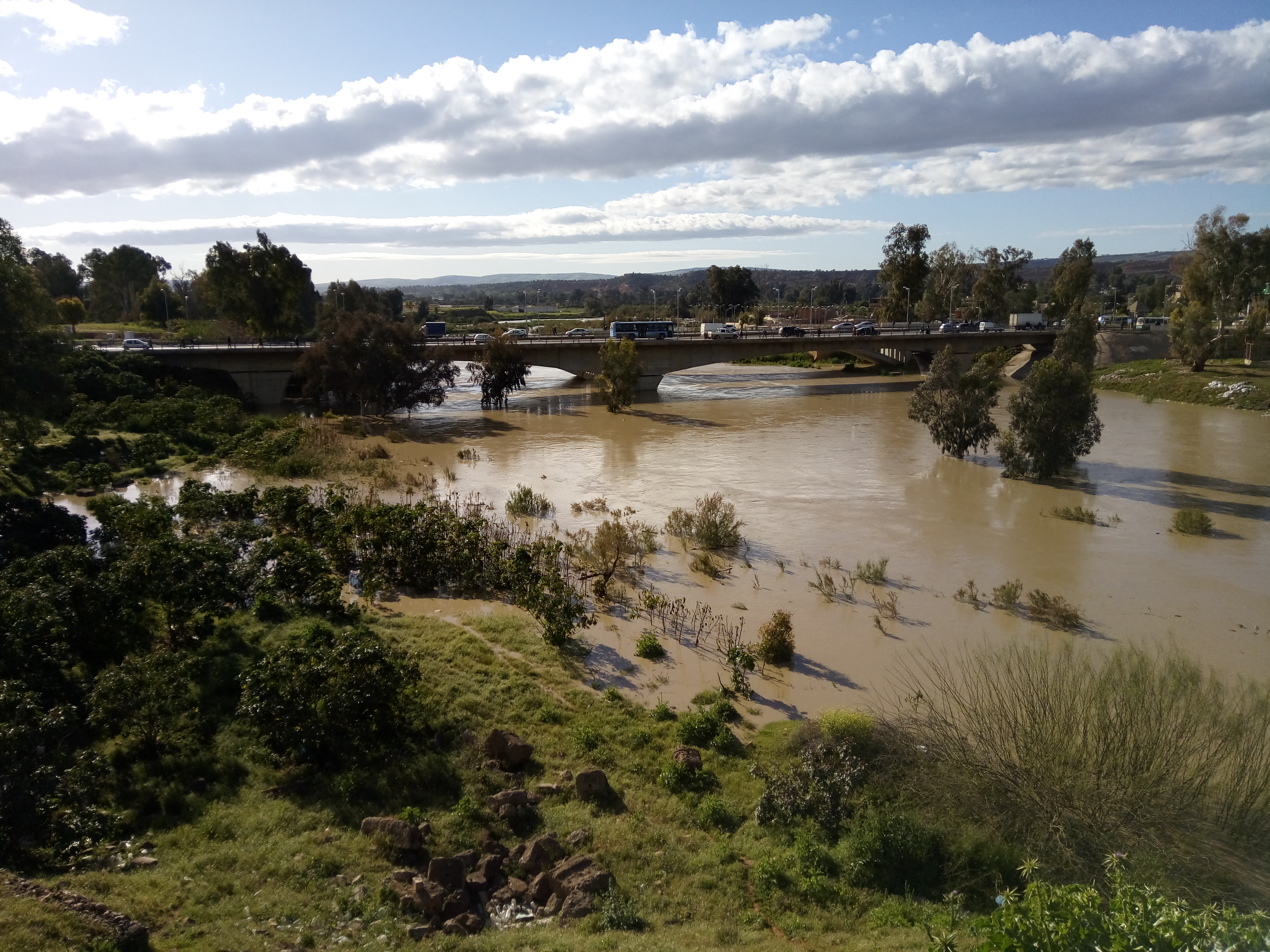
- Cheliff Bridge nearby Ech Cheliff
- Etymology: Berber Chenaliph
- Native name: وادي الشلف (Arabic)

Location
- Country: Algeria
- Cities: Mostaganem; Chlef; Aïn Defla; Médéa

Physical characteristics
- Source: Boughezoul
- Mouth: Mediterranean Sea
  - coordinates: 36°02′22″N 0°07′59″E
- Length: 725 km (450 mi)

Chelif River (Arabic: وادي الشلف) (also spelled Chéliff, or Sheliff) is a 700-kilometre-long (430 mi) river in Algeria, the longest in the country. It rises in the Saharan Atlas near the city of Boughezoul, flows through the Tell Atlas and empties into the Mediterranean Sea north of the city of Mostaganem. The water level in the river often fluctuates. The river is being used for irrigation (mainly on its lower course).

The river was formerly called the Mekerra and the Sig River.
