= List of disasters in Switzerland by death toll =

Satellite image of Switzerland

This list of Swiss disasters by death toll includes major disasters (excluding acts of war) that occurred on Swiss soil or involved Swiss citizens, in a definable incident, in which at least 10 fatalities occurred.

== Within Switzerland ==
Fatalities	Year	Article	Description	Location	Ref.
24,449	1918-1919	Spanish flu	Pandemic	Switzerland	
11,039	2020-2022	COVID-19 pandemic in Switzerland	Pandemic	Switzerland	
2,000	1356	1356 Basel earthquake	Earthquake	Basel-Stadt	
1,000	2003	2003 European heatwave	Heatwave	Switzerland	
542	2023	2023 Summer Heat Wave	Heatwave	Switzerland	
500	1515	Biasca flash flood	Flash flood	Biasca, Ticino	
457	1806	Goldau Landslide (Bergsturz von Goldau)	Landslide	Arth-Goldau, Schwyz	
400	1798	Days of terror in Nidwalden	French invasion of Switzerland	Nidwalden, Switzerland	
320	1584	1584 Aigle earthquake	Earthquake, rockfall (Ovaille de 1584) and tsunami	Aigle, Vaud	
140	1595	Bagnes flash flood	Flash flood	Bagnes, Valais	
115	1881	Rockslide of Elm	Rockslide	Elm, Glarus	
108	1973	Invicta International Airlines Flight 435	Plane crash	Hochwald, Solothurn	
98	1951	Winter of Terror	Avalanches	Switzerland: Vals : 19; Andermatt : 13; Vallascia : 10	·
88	1965	Mattmark disaster during Mattmarksee construction	Glacier collapse of the Allalin Glacier	Saas Valley.	
84	1940-1945	Bombardments of neutral Switzerland during World War II	Aerial bombardments and accidents over Switzerland by Axis powers and the Allies	Different Areas in Switzerland. Mainly Schaffhausen, Zürich and Basel.	
80	1963	Swissair Flight 306	Plane crash	Dürrenäsch, Aargau	
76	1748	1748 Aargau floods	Floods	Aargau	
73	1891	Münchenstein rail disaster	Rail disaster	Münchenstein, Basel-Landschaft	
66	1808	1808 Avalanche winter	Avalanche season	Canton of Bern, Grisons	
63	1778	Küsnacht flood (Küsnachter Überschwemmung 1778)	Flood	Küsnacht, Zürich	
51	1868	1868 flood	Flood	Switzerland	
50-90	1720	1720 Obergesteln avalanche	Avalanche	Obergesteln, Valais	
49	1888	1888 Avalanche winter	Avalanche season	Switzerland	
48	1994	1994 Solar Temple massacres	Mass suicides in two villages	Cheiry, Fribourg and Granges-sur-Salvan, Valais	
47	1970	Swissair Flight 330	Plane crash	Würenlingen, Aargau	
46	1990	Alitalia Flight 404	Plane crash	Weiach, Zürich	
45	1971	Balkan Bulgarian Airlines Flight 130	Plane crash	Zurich Airport, Zürich	
41	2026	Crans-Montana bar fire	Fire in ski resort bar	Crans-Montana, Valais	
39	1982	Pfäffikon level crossing accident (Eisenbahnunfall von Pfäffikon ZH)	Level crossing accident	Pfäffikon, Zürich	
30	1970	1970 Reckingen avalanche	Avalanche	Reckingen-Gluringen, Valais	
29	1999	Storm Lothar	14 direct fatalities and 15 indirect	Different locations mainly in the Swiss Plateau	
28	2012	Sierre coach crash	Bus crash	Sierre Tunnel, Valais	
28	1971	Burghölzli Psychiatric Hospitale fire	Structure fire	Zürich, Switzerland	
24	2001	Crossair Flight 3597	Plane crash	Bassersdorf, Zürich	
23	1871	Train collision at Colombier Station	Train collision	Colombier, Neuchâtel	
23	1956	ČSA Flight 548	Plane crash	Eglisau, Zürich	
21	1948	1948 Wädenswil train crash (Eisenbahnunfall von Wädenswil)	Train derailment	Wädenswil, Zürich	
21	1999	Wilderswil Canyoning Disaster	21 People die in a flash flood while canyoning in the Saxetbach	Wilderswil, Canton of Bern	
20	2018	2018 Ju-Air Junkers Ju 52 crash	Plane crash	Piz Segnas, Glarus	
18	2024	2024 Switzerland floods	Floods	Switzerland	
17	1770	Praettigau rockfall	Rockfall	Prättigau, Grisons	
16	2000	2000 Valais storm	Floods and landslides	Valais (especially the landslide in Gondo)	
16	1961	Hergiswil Bus Accident	Bus accident	Hergiswil, Nidwalden	
15	1924	1924 Bellinzona train collision (Eisenbahnunfall von Bellinzona)	Train collision	Bellinzona, Ticino	
15	2001	Zug Parliament Mass Shooting	Mass shooting	Zug, Switzerland	
14	1891	Zollikofen station train collision (Eisenbahnunfall von Zollikofen)	Train collision	Zollikofen, Bern	
13	1932	November 1932 Geneva shooting	The Swiss Army opened fire at protesters	Geneva, Switzerland	
13	1935	1935 San Giacomo Douglas DC-2 crash	Plane crash	Mesocco, Graubünden	
13	1968	1968 Saint-Léonard train collision (Eisenbahnunfall von St-Léonard)	Train collision	Saint-Léonard, Valais	
13	1972	Bettmeralp cable car crash	Cable car crash	Bettmeralp, Valais	
13	1938	Piz Cengalo Lufthansa crash	Plane crash	Piz Cengalo, Graubünden	
12	1941	Hamberger Firework Factory explosion	Work related accident kills 12 factory workers	Oberried am Brienzersee, Canton of Bern	
12	1999	Evolène avalanche	Avalanche	Evolène, Valais	
12	1985	Uster indoor swimming pool roof collapse	The roof collapsed trapping 12 visitors in the pool which caused them to drown	Uster, Zurich	
12	2005	Orsières Bus Accident	Traffic accident	Orsières, Valais	
11	2001	Gotthard Road Tunnel disaster	Tunnel fire	Uri/Ticino	
11	1887	1887 Zug slide	Slide	Zug, Zug	
11	1985	1985 Täsch-Zermatt avalanche	Avalanche	Täsch, Valais	
11	1941	1941 Wichtrach train collision	Train collision	Wichtrach, Bern	
11	1942	1942 Tüscherz train collision (Eisenbahnunfall von Tüscherz)	Train collision	Tüscherz-Alfermée, Bern	
11	1945	1945 Andermatt avalanche	Avalanche	Andermatt, Uri	
11	1970	Bavaria Fluggesellschaft Jetstream crash	Plane crash	Bever, Graubünden	
10	1961	1961 Vaz/Obervaz avalanche	Avalanche	Vaz/Obervaz, Graubünden	
10	1947	1947 Einsiedeln train collision	Train collision	Einsiedeln, Schwyz	
10	1959	Hamberger Firework Factory explosion	The second fatal accident in this factory	Oberried am Brienzersee, Canton of Bern	
10	1917	Rhaetian Railway avalanche accident	Avalanche	Davos, Graubünden	
10	2018	2018 accident in the Valais Alps	A storm kills seven ski tourers and mountaineers in several locations	Valais, Canton of Bern	
10	2000	Crossair Flight 498	Plane crash	Niederhasli, Zürich	
several hundred	563	Tauredunum event	Landslide and tsunami	Lake Geneva	

== Abroad ==
Below is a list of disasters involving Swiss nationals that occurred abroad. The number of fatalities includes only Swiss nationals.

Fatalities	Year	Article	Description	Location	Ref.
113	2004	2004 Indian Ocean earthquake and tsunami	113 Swiss citizens died in the disaster	Southeast Asia	
48	1998	Swissair Flight 111	Plane crash	Offshore of Peggy's Cove, Nova Scotia, Canada	
36	1997	Luxor massacre	62 People killed in total, 36 of them were Swiss tourists	Luxor, Egypt	

== See also ==
- List of earthquakes in Switzerland
