= Sihuas (disambiguation) =

Sihuas may refer to a city, a district and a province in Peru.

For the use of the term in a specific setting, see:

- Sihuas, Peru
- Sihuas District, Sihuas province.
- Sihuas Province, Ancash Region.
