= Huayllabamba District =

Huayllabamba District may refer to:

- Huayllabamba District, Sihuas
- Huayllabamba District, Urubamba

Huayllabamba may also refer to the capitals of those districts:

- Huayllabamba, Sihuas
- Huayllabamba, Urubamba
