= Huayllabamba =

Huayllabamba may refer to:

- Huayllabamba, Urubamba
- Huayllabamba District, Urubamba
- Huayllabamba, Sihuas
- Huayllabamba District, Sihuas

== See also ==
- Huayllapampa District
