= 1946 Ancash earthquake =

Earthquake affecting Peru

- Location within Peru
- UTC time: 1946-11-10 17:42:56
- ISC event: 898660
- USGS-ANSS: ComCat
- Local date: November 10, 1946
- Local time: 12:42 PET
- Magnitude: 7.0 M_{s}, 6.8–7.0 M_{w}
- Depth: 15 km (9.3 mi)
- Epicenter: 8.410°S 77.535°W
- Type: Normal
- Areas affected: Peru
- Max. intensity: MMI XI (Extreme)
- Landslides: 44
- Aftershocks: Yes
- Casualties: 1,396 dead

The 1946 Ancash earthquake occurred in the High Andes mountains of central Peru on November 10 at 12:43 PET. It had a surface-wave magnitude of 7.0 and a maximum Mercalli intensity of XI (Extreme). The intraplate shock was caused by normal faulting along a pre-existing thrust fault within the mountains, and produced a 21 km (13 mi) zone of surface rupture. Many villages, including Quinches, Pampas, Sihuas and Conchucos experienced partial or total devastation. At least 1,396 people were killed, including 500 people who died from landslides, one of which buried the village of Acobamba, resulting in more than 200 deaths. The shaking was also felt as far as Lima and Guayaquil. Many aftershocks were felt within the next two years, including a M_{w} 6.1 event in 1948 that killed seven people.

== Tectonic setting ==
Off the west coast of Peru lies a convergent boundary where the Nazca plate subducts beneath the South American plate. Beneath the South American plate of north-central Peru, the subduction is flat-slab, causing a significant amount of deformation at the surface, which is expressed as the High Andes. Despite being located in a compressional zone, shallow continental extension occurs within the Andes mountains. This is because the high elevation of the Andes (4,000 m (13,000 ft) or higher) can induce large gravitational stress within the crust, causing extension processes within the lithosphere. In the Ancash region, this stress is accommodated by pre-existing reverse faults that are reactivated as normal faults because they represent a zone of weakness within this gravitational stress. The 1946 earthquake occurred due to faulting on one of these reactivated faults.

== Earthquake ==
The earthquake occurred on 10 November at 12:43 PET with an epicenter in the Quiches District of Ancash, or about 120 km (75 mi) north of Huaraz. It was caused by slip along a shallow-angle normal fault at a depth of 15 km (9.3 mi). A surface-wave magnitude of 7.0 was assigned by the International Seismological Centre. A recalculation of the earthquake on the moment magnitude scale yielded values of 7.0 or 6.8.

In 1991, seismologists conducted trenching of the surface rupture zone and discovered evidence of an earlier similarly sized earthquake in the Late Pleistocene. They subsequently inferred that the return interval for such earthquakes on the fault was more than 13,000 years with an error margin of 1,000 years. They also estimated that the annual slip rate on the fault was less than 0.27 mm (0.011 in). Seismologist Diane Doser revisited the seismic data obtained during the earthquake and determined that it had a hypocenter depth of 15–17 km (9.3–10.6 mi) and ruptured along a fault dipping 30° to the west.

Slip was detected on two parallel faults spaced 3 km (1.9 mi) apart; the Quiches Fault Zone and another opposite-facing fault. The Quiches Fault Zone is a reactivated reverse fault within the Marañón fold and thrust belt. While the surface ruptures on the Quiches Fault Zone indicate a steep (55–65°) dipping fault, Doser's results suggest the earthquake occurred on a shallower fault plane. This is because both fault zones represent a ramp fault that branched upwards from the shallow-angle thrust structure at a depth of 2.6 km (1.6 mi). Most of the rupture likely occurred on this deeper fault that dips 30° southwest, and propagated to the surface on the Quiches and antithetic faults.

=== Surface rupture ===
A northwest–southeast zone of discontinuous surface ruptures extending 21 km (13 mi) occurred within the sedimentary rocks and glacial deposits. These features were reported on a topographic high area west of the Marañón River at an altitude of 3,600–4,100 m (11,800–13,500 ft). They were identified along the Quiches Fault Zone and exhibited predominantly normal faulting. It was one of the earliest documented surface ruptures in South America. However, the extreme terrain and road closures (due to landslides and fractures) prevented surveyors from making further discoveries of additional surface ruptures that may exist. The rupture can be divided into two segments; Angasharj in the north and Llamacorral to the south; both ruptured on southwest dipping faults. These segments were separated by a 12 km (7.5 mi) zone without ruptures. One possibility is because this section was involved in a buried rupture (and did not reach the surface) or the rupture occurred on another fault that surveyors did not report. Two zones of surface ruptures were reported 3 km (1.9 mi) south of this gap, measuring 0.4 km (0.25 mi) and 2 km (1.2 mi), respectively, with a maximum offset of 1.7 m (5 ft 7 in) on the longer strand. These additional ruptures occurred on northeast dipping faults, antithetic to the Quiches Fault Zone.

The Angasharj segment trends northwest to west–northwest, rupturing through the Mesozoic sandstone and producing a maximum offset of 1.25 m (4 ft 1 in). The Llamacorral segment is further separated into two; a 1.5 km (0.93 mi) zone trending northwest in the north and a 4 km (2.5 mi) zone extending north–northwest in the south. This segment cuts through the Cretaceous limestones and Quaternary moraines and outwash. A maximum offset of 3.5 m (11 ft) was recorded in the limestone while 1.5 m (4 ft 11 in) of movement occurred in the glacial deposits. In areas where the rupture either bends or branched away, secondary scarps were found in the top soil layer parallel to the main strand. The presence of oblique "gashes" relative to the rupture and striations on the exposed fault suggested an element of sinistral strike-slip movement.

=== Intensity ===
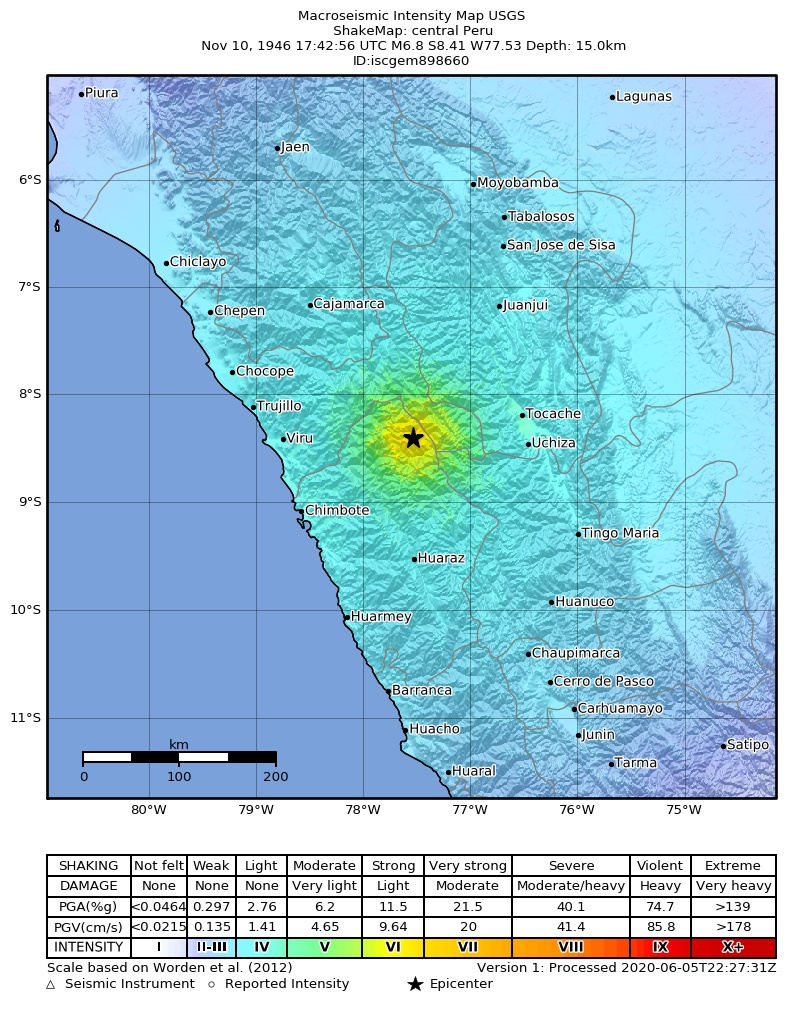
ShakeMap (generated in 2020) for the event

The earthquake was felt for more than 450,000 km^{2} (170,000 sq mi) and as far as Lima, 410 km (250 mi) to the south of the epicenter, and at the port of Guayaquil, Ecuador, 690 km (430 mi) north. Peruvian seismologist Enrique Silgado Ferro prepared an isoseismal map to illustrate the distribution of seismic intensity based on the Mercalli intensity scale. In the map, intensity IX (Violent) effects was assigned to a northwest–southeast trending elliptical-shaped area which extended about 40 km (25 mi). This intensity was reported in a 1,600 km^{2} (620 sq mi) region. Within this zone, intensities X–XI (Extreme) was reported in a narrow area from Cerro Pelagatos to the villages of Mayas and Quiches. There, major changes in topograpy and large landslides occurred. The area assigned intensity VIII surrounded the intensity IX zone with an estimated area of 2,300 km^{2} (890 sq mi). Based on the map, the VIII (Severe) effects were mainly reported south or southwest of the IX zone while towards the northeast, the intensity rapidly diminished.

=== Impact ===
The earthquake affected a sparsely populated and mountainous region with many villages spaced far apart. At least 1,396 people were reported dead including 500 deaths caused by landslides. Among the dead were 200 indigenous workers and a rancher whose remains were discovered in a steep valley. Large portions (more than 80 percent) of Sihuas, Conchucos, Quinches and Pampas were totally or partially destroyed. Four villages; Chalan, Llama, Citabamba, and Mollepata; also experienced partial destruction. Severe damage also occurred in the Pasto Bucno mining area. In Quiches, 677 people died while hundreds more died in other villages.

The earthquake also triggered 45 major landslides; three of the largest had volumes of 36,550,546 m^{3} (1.2907704×10^{9} cu ft), 13,503,994 m^{3} (476,889,000 cu ft) and 10,582,563 m^{3} (373,719,700 cu ft), respectively. One of these completely buried Acobamba in the Suytucocha Valley, killing 217 residents and placing it under 20 m (66 ft) of debris. The villages of Chingalpo, Soledad, Cheche, and San Miguel were also damaged by landslides. About 25,000,000 m^{3} (880,000,000 cu ft) of decomposed granite slid into the Pelagatos Valley.

=== Aftershocks ===
There were hundreds of reports of aftershocks within two years of the earthquake, though the lack of seismometers meant the exact number remains unknown. The number of instances where aftershocks could be felt varied across villages. For example, between 12:44 on 10 November and the next day, there were 450 shocks felt at Pampas while 81 were felt at Sihuas and 60 in Tarica. An aftershock on 14 February 1948 with a maximum Mercalli intensity of VII (Very strong) caused seven landslide-related deaths and was felt for 130,000 km^{2} (50,000 sq mi). Within 24 hours of this shock, eight aftershocks were felt. According to the International Seismological Centre, this event measured M_{w} 6.1.

== See also ==
- List of earthquakes in Peru
- List of earthquakes in 1946
