= Wilder Calderón =

Peruvian politician

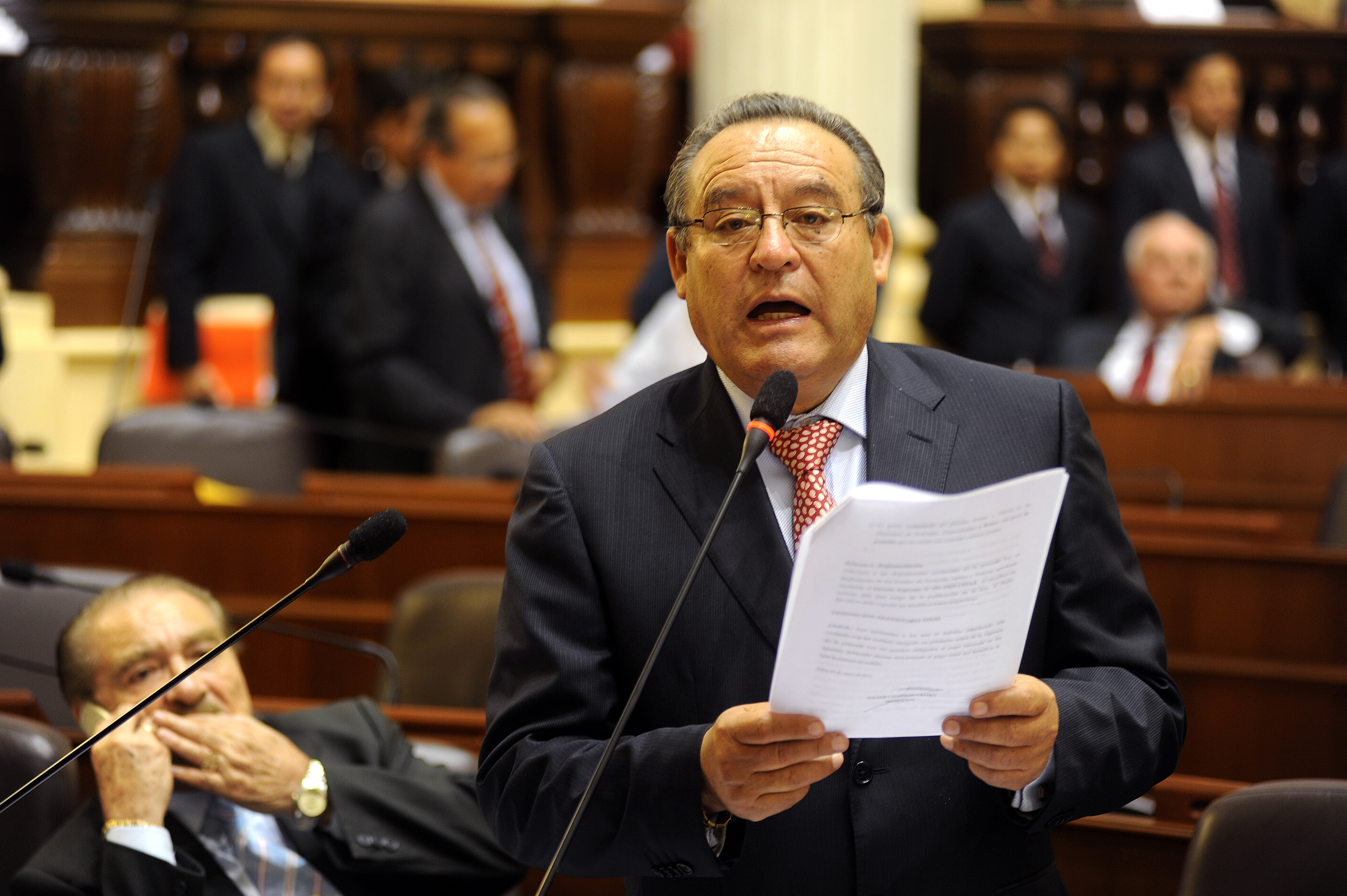
- Calderón speaking in Congress in 2011

Member of Congress
- In office 26 July 2006 – 26 July 2011
- Constituency: Ancash

Personal details
- Born: Wilder Félix Calderón Castro; 18 July 1947 (age 79) Sihuas, Sihuas District, Peru
- Party: Peruvian Aprista Party
- Education: Federico Villarreal National University
- Occupation: Politician

Wilder Félix Calderón Castro (born 18 July 1947) is a Peruvian politician. He is a former Congressman, elected in the 2006 elections, representing the Ancash region for the 2006–2011 term. He lost his seat in the 2011 elections, when he ran for re-election, but he received a low number of votes and was not re-elected. In the 2014 regional elections, he ran for Regional President of Ancash, but he was not elected, as he received only 3.1% of the vote. Calderón belongs to the Peruvian Aprista Party and graduated from the Federico Villareal National University.

== Biography ==
He was born in Sihuas, department of Áncash, on July 18, 1947. Son of Alejandro Calderón Asteis and Lucía Castro Ponce. He completed his primary studies in his hometown and secondary in the San Pedro de Chimbote Educational Center. Between 1965 and 1969 he studied at the Faculty of Education of the Federico Villarreal National University, graduating as a professor and in 2011 he began studying law at the Alas Peruanas University. During his studies at Federico Villarreal University, he was part of the Peruvian Aprista Party. In 1973 he founded, together with Manuel Robles Morales and Ciro Ramos Salas, the CEPEA Higher Education Institute, of which he is General Manager. Likewise, together with the then also member of the Aprista Party Enrique Cornejo, he promoted the creation of the Universidad Peruana Simón Bolívar, which was an integral part of the CEPEA group and whose licensing was denied by SUNEDU in February 2019.
