= Tainan earthquake =

Tainan earthquake may refer to:

- 1946 Tainan earthquake
- 2016 Tainan earthquake

== See also ==
- List of earthquakes in Taiwan
