= Acobamba District =

Acobamba District may refer to the following districts of Peru:

- Acobamba District, Acobamba
- Acobamba District, Sihuas
- Acobamba District, Tarma
