= Alfonso Ugarte (disambiguation) =

Alfonso Ugarte (1847–1880) was a Peruvian soldier. The term may also refer to:

== Places ==
- Alfonso Ugarte District, in Áncash
- Avenida Alfonso Ugarte, in Lima

== Organisations ==
- Alfonso Ugarte de Chiclín
- Alfonso Ugarte de Puno
- Unión Alfonso Ugarte
