= Pilanku (Sihuas) =

Mountain in Peru

- Location within Peru

Highest point
- Elevation: 4,200 m (13,800 ft)
- Coordinates: 8°28′28″S 77°26′15″W

Geography
- Location: Peru, Ancash Region
- Parent range: Andes, Cordillera Blanca

Pilanku (Ancash Quechua for dam, also spelled Pilanco) is a mountain in the northern extension of the Cordillera Blanca in the Andes of Peru which reaches a height of approximately 4,200 m (13,780 ft). It is located in the Ancash Region, Sihuas Province, on the border of the districts of Alfonso Ugarte and Huayllabamba.
