= 1946 Vancouver Island earthquake =

Canadian natural disaster

- Location within British Columbia
- UTC time: 1946-06-23 17:13:24
- ISC event: 898434
- USGS-ANSS: ComCat
- Local date: June 23, 1946
- Local time: 10:15 a.m.
- Magnitude: 7.0 M_{s} 7.5 M_{w}
- Depth: 15 km (9.3 mi)
- Epicenter: 49.62°N 125.26°W
- Areas affected: Canada; United States
- Total damage: Limited
- Max. intensity: MMI VIII (Severe)
- Casualties: 2

The 1946 Vancouver Island earthquake struck Vancouver Island on the coast of British Columbia, Canada, on June 23 at 10:15 a.m. with a magnitude estimated at 7.0 M_{s} and 7.5 M_{w}. The main shock epicenter occurred in the Forbidden Plateau area northwest of Courtenay. While most of the large earthquakes in the Vancouver area occur at tectonic plate boundaries, the 1946 Vancouver Island earthquake was a crustal event. Shaking was felt from Portland, Oregon, to Prince Rupert, British Columbia. This is one of the most damaging earthquakes in the history of British Columbia, but damage was restricted because there were no heavily populated areas near the epicentre, where severe shaking occurred.

This earthquake is Canada's largest historic onshore earthquake. However, the greatest earthquake in Canadian history recorded by seismometers was the 1949 Queen Charlotte earthquake, an interplate earthquake that occurred on the ocean bottom just off the rugged coast of Graham Island, which reached magnitude 8.1 on the moment magnitude scale.

== Background and tectonics ==
The tectonics that caused the 1946 Vancouver Island earthquake are poorly known. No surface expression of the offset was noticed, most likely because the epicenter area was very remote and densely forested. A comprehensive examination and computer interpretation of seismic data from over 50 stations have shown that a possible explanation of the earthquake includes a strike-slip fault corresponding to the lengthy axis of Vancouver Island, known as the Beaufort Range Fault. A fault running across Vancouver Island, corresponding to the projection of the underwater Nootka Fault on the British Columbia Coast, is also a possibility but an unlikely one because the earthquake showed no evidence of offsets along with a series of highways that follows much of the eastern coastline of Vancouver Island, called Island Highway, and other roads between Courtenay and Campbell River. The estimated depth of the earthquake places it within the continental crust, not at the margin with the Cascadia subduction zone, and certainly not inside the subduction zone itself. Specifically, the earthquake's epicenter was positioned somewhere in the Forbidden Plateau region, in central Vancouver Island.

== Damage and casualties ==
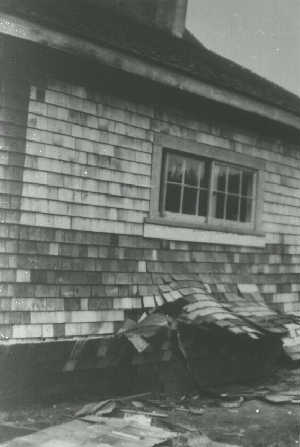
House failure in Comox

Though very destructive, the earthquake caused only two deaths: Jacob L. Kingston, aged 69, and Daniel Fidler, who was 50. Kingston suffered a heart attack in Seattle, while Fidler drowned when his dinghy was swamped by a wave.

In Vancouver, damage consisted of lofty buildings oscillating violently, and a piece of masonry fell from the local railway station. In addition, within the city, at least one gas line cracked and several power outages occurred. Fires broke out in several chimneys, and at least one swing-span bridge was fractured by the shaking. In the Hotel Vancouver, which housed the elderly and caught on fire, more than 500 war veterans' families fled the flames. One writer, George Finley, stated that the Lions Gate Bridge "swayed like a leaf", coinciding with a "low, rumbling sound, like a deep growl".

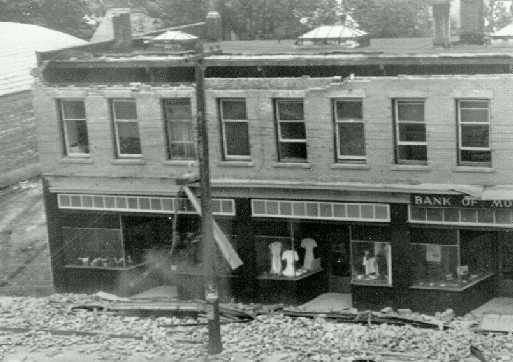
Damage to Bank of Montreal in Port Alberni.

The 1946 Vancouver Island earthquake demolished 75% of the chimneys in the communities of Cumberland, Union Bay, and Courtenay and caused extensive damage in Comox, Port Alberni, and Powell River, on the eastern side of the Strait of Georgia. Some chimneys were fractured in Victoria, and people in Victoria and Vancouver experienced great fright, with some seen fleeing into the streets.

Landslides created by the earthquake were common throughout Vancouver Island. Land subsidence resulted from the earthquake, most commonly around shorelines on the Strait of Georgia. This included the bottom of Deep Bay which sank between 2.7 m (9 ft) and 25.6 m (84 ft). These measurements were reported by the Canadian Hydrographic Service. Also, a 3-metre (9.8 ft) ground shift occurred on Read Island. Ships throughout the region were affected, and those on board them during the earthquake described it as similar to having run over a sand bar or striking a rock. Undersea power lines were destroyed in the long narrow Alberni Inlet and near the city of Powell River. All lighthouse keepers in the surrounding area felt the earthquake, and experienced damage including shattered windows and smashed dishes. A tsunami struck the west coast of Texada Island with two waves, the first being 2 metres (6 ft 7 in) high and the second 1 metre (3 ft 3 in) high. The earthquake caused a landslide near Mount Colonel Foster. One fortunate occurrence allowed researchers afterward to review the effects of the earthquake: an aerial photographic survey of Vancouver Island had commenced in 1946, soon after the earthquake, and these photographs were eventually studied by a geoscientist in the late 1970s.

South of the Canada–United States border in Washington state, some chimneys fell at Eastsound on Orcas Island and a concrete mill was damaged at Port Angeles. In Seattle, some damage occurred on upper floors of tall buildings that had visibly swayed. The expansion joints on a bridge on U.S. Highway 10 near Mercer Island were also damaged by the earthquake. The shock was strongly felt at Bellingham, Everett, Olympia, Raymond, and Tacoma. A 6.1-metre-wide (20 ft), 24-metre-long (80 ft) crack in the glacier covering Big Four Mountain in Snohomish County, Washington, was created by the earthquake. The earthquake was powerful enough to knock the needle off a seismograph at the University of Washington and was sustained for about a minute even in Seattle.

The earthquake caused significant movement among structures, moving one 91-metre (300 ft) wall about 11 metres (35 ft) and caused one home to shift for 1.5 metres (5 ft) off its foundation. The total affected area in Canada and the United States was about 260,000 km^{2} (100,000 mi^{2}).

== See also ==
- List of deadly earthquakes since 1900
- List of earthquakes in 1946
- List of earthquakes in Canada
- List of earthquakes in the United States
