= 1946 Valais earthquake =

Earthquake in Switzerland

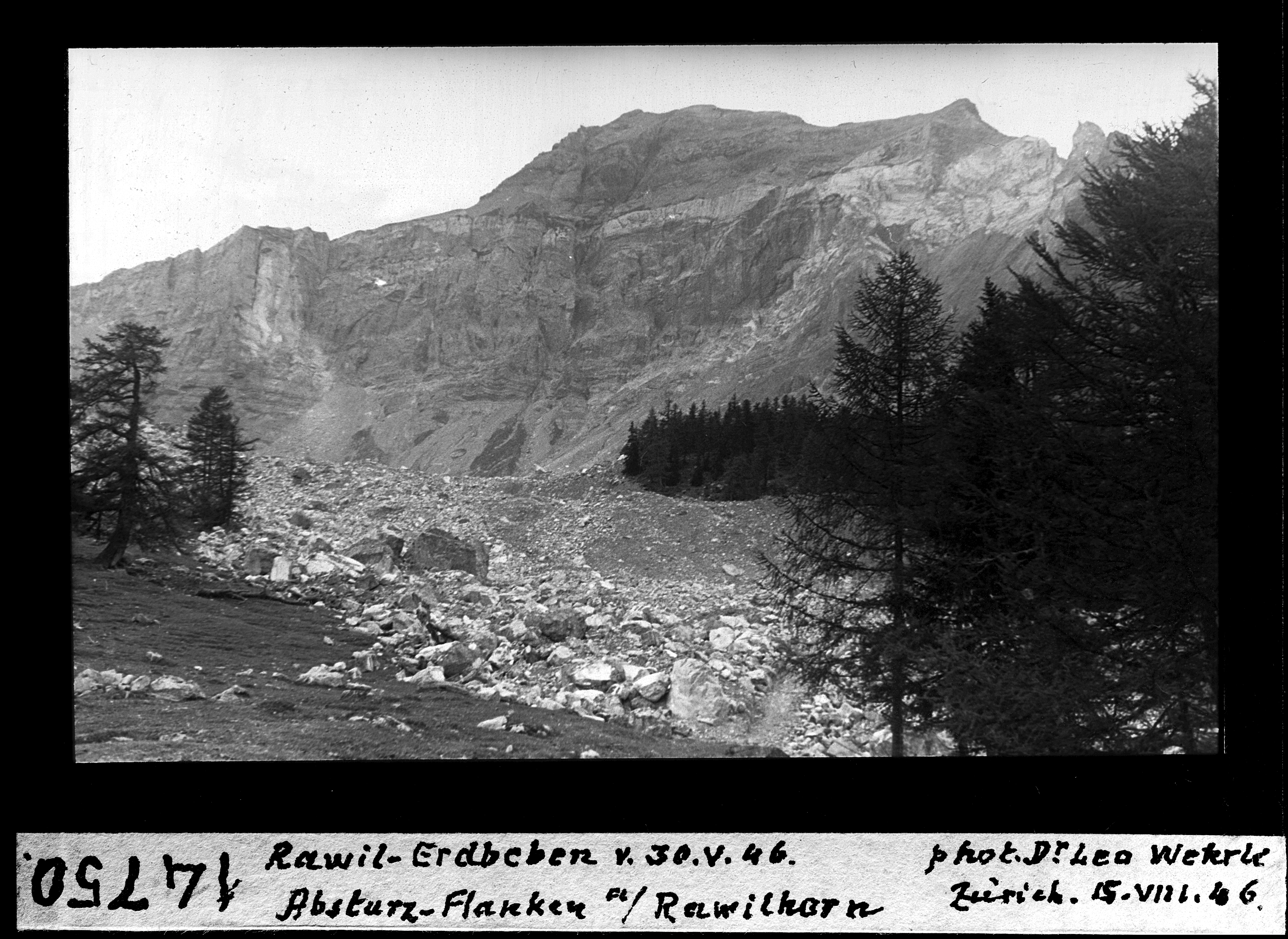
- Rockslide at the Combe des Andins

- Location within Switzerland
- UTC time: 1946-01-25 17:31:50
- ISC event: 898227
- USGS-ANSS: ComCat
- Local date: 25 January 1946
- Local time: 17:32 CET
- Magnitude: 6.2 M_{w}
- Epicenter: 46.4°N 7.5°E
- Areas affected: Switzerland and France
- Max. intensity: MMI VIII (Severe)
- Aftershocks: Three recorded. The largest was a 5.9 M_{w}
- Casualties: 3 dead in Switzerland; 1 dead in France

The 1946 Valais earthquake struck on 25 January at 17:32 local time with an epicenter region in Sierre, near the capital city of Sion in Valais, a canton in Switzerland. The earthquake had an estimated moment magnitude (M_{w}) of 6.2 and a maximum Modified Mercalli intensity of VIII (Severe).

== Earthquake ==
The earthquake immediately disrupted the supply of power in Sierre, and other nearby populated centers in the Valais canton. The tremors caused panic and drove residents out of their homes. Many homes suffered damage to their structure, with chimneys destroyed, detached roof tiles, and broken facades. A newly constructed church in Chippis partially collapsed and had some of the remaining structures severely damaged and unstable. Despite the severity of damage, with 3,500 buildings damaged, there were very few injuries or deaths reported; three persons suffered fatal shocks and another was crushed to death by a car in Aix-les-Bains, France. Twenty-one rockfalls, one major, occurred. The earthquake also triggered 11 landslides, four avalanches, and a number of ground effects along the Rhône river valley. The landslides and rockfalls reportedly destroyed huts and barns near the mountainside. Damage was also reported in the district of Vaud in Villeneuve. In Château-d'Œx, the quake knocked display items onto the ground at an art exhibition. The total damage is estimated at 5.265 million Swiss francs in 1946, or 25.7 million in 2021.

== Foreshocks and aftershocks ==
Three large aftershocks were recorded up till May 1946. The first two measured 5.2 and 5.1 on 26 January and 4 February were assigned maximum intensities VI to V. The largest occurred on May 30 with a magnitude of M_{w} 5.9 and maximum intensity of VII. The aftershock on May 30 triggered 22 rockfalls and three landslides.

Prior to the mainshock, two notable foreshocks occurred on November 10 and 13 with respective intensities V and IV on the Rossi-Forel scale.

== See also ==
- List of earthquakes in 1946
- List of earthquakes in Switzerland
- List of earthquakes in France
