= 1946 Varto–Hınıs earthquake =

Earthquake in Turkey

- Location within Turkey
- UTC time: 1946-05-31 03:12:46
- ISC event: 898413
- USGS-ANSS: ComCat
- Local date: May 31, 1946
- Local time: 05:12
- Magnitude: M_{w} 5.9
- Depth: 15 km (9.3 mi)
- Epicenter: 39.23°N 41.37°E
- Areas affected: Turkey
- Max. intensity: MMI VIII (Severe)
- Casualties: 800–1,300

The 1946 Varto–Hınıs earthquake occurred at 05:12:46 local time on 31 May. The earthquake had an estimated moment magnitude of 5.9 and a maximum felt intensity of VIII (Severe) on the Mercalli intensity scale, causing between 800 and 1,300 casualties.

== See also ==
- List of earthquakes in 1946
- List of earthquakes in Turkey
