= 1946 Aleutian Islands earthquake =

Earthquake near the Aleutian Islands, Alaska

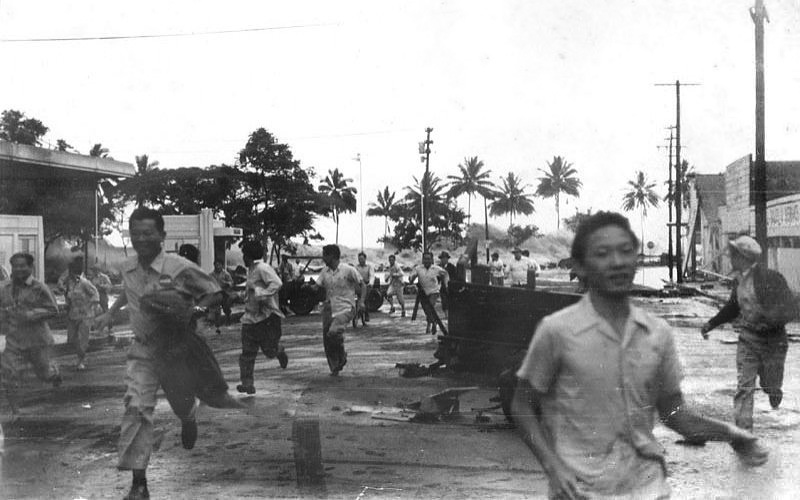
- People fleeing the approaching tsunami in Hilo, Hawaii

- Location within Alaska
- UTC time: 1946-04-01 12:29:01
- ISC event: 898313
- USGS-ANSS: ComCat
- Local date: April 1, 1946
- Local time: 02:29
- Magnitude: 7.4 M_{s}, 8.6 M_{w}, 9.3 M_{t}
- Depth: 15 km (9.3 mi)
- Epicenter: 53.49°N 162.83°W
- Type: Megathrust
- Areas affected: Hawaii, Alaska; United States
- Max. intensity: MMI VI (Strong)
- Tsunami: Up to 42 m (138 ft) at Unimak Island
- Casualties: 165–173

The 1946 Aleutian Islands earthquake occurred near the Aleutian Islands, Alaska on April 1, 1946. The shock measured (M_{w}) 8.6, M_{t} 9.3 or (M_{s}) 7.4. It had a maximum Mercalli intensity of VI (Strong). The seafloor along the fault was elevated, triggering a Pacific-wide tsunami with multiple destructive waves at heights ranging from 45–138 ft (14–42 m), resulting in 165–173 casualties and over US$26 million (equivalent to $429,000,000 in 2025) in damage. The tsunami obliterated the Scotch Cap Lighthouse on Unimak Island, Alaska among others, and killed all five lighthouse keepers. Despite the damage to the Aleutian Island Unimak, the tsunami had an almost imperceptible effect on the Alaskan mainland.

== Tectonic setting ==
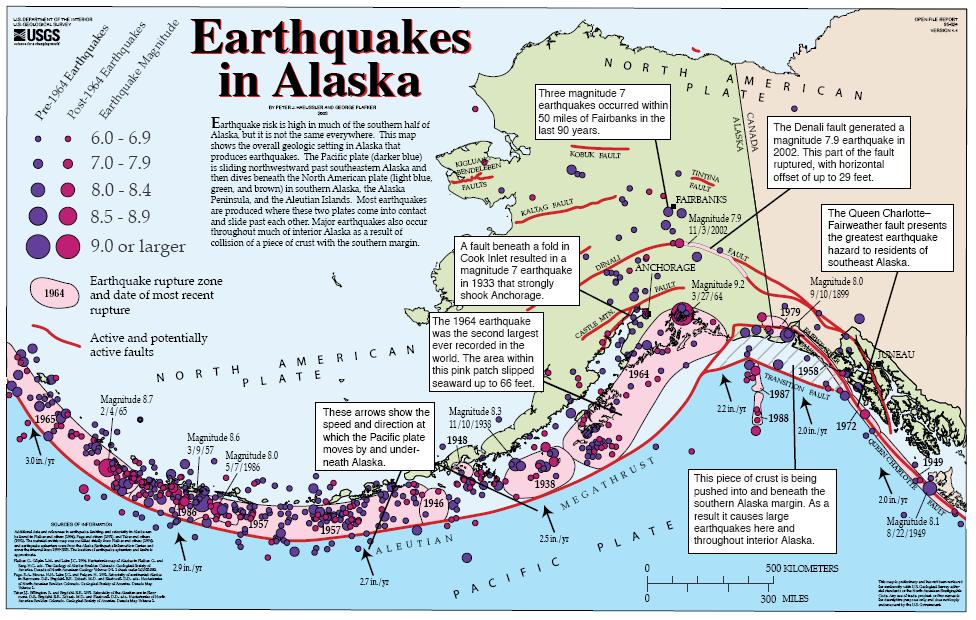
Map showing the tectonics and seismicity of Alaska

The Aleutian Islands are a group of 14 large and 55 smaller volcanic islands situated between mainland Alaska and Kamchatka. They are situated along the Aleutian Trench as they were formed by the active subduction of the oceanic Pacific plate underneath the continental crust of the North American plate. The western portion of the trench becomes more and more oblique until near the Commander Islands where faulting becomes nearly exclusively strike-slip and causes earthquakes such as the 2017 Komandorski Islands earthquake. The trench ends where the Kuril-Kamchatka Trench begins in the west. In the east, the trench extends for a couple of thousand miles before reaching the transition zone near Yakataga responsible for creating earthquakes such as the 1899 Yakutat Bay earthquakes. The collision ends slightly further east, where the Queen Charlotte Fault becomes the dominant fault of the tectonic regime. This specific area of the Aleutian Islands is thought to have ruptured in the 1585 Aleutian Islands earthquake.

== Earthquake ==
The earthquake struck at 02:29 local time on April 1, 1946, at a shallow depth of 15 km (9.3 mi). The earthquake was very large, but the maximum felt intensity was only a VI. The earthquake was originally thought to be a rather smaller earthquake of M_{s} 7.4, however further research uncovered that this was truly a much larger event, but with a hidden seismic signature. A size of M_{w} 8.6 fits this event best, with an estimated slip between 9 m (30 ft) and 12.7 m (42 ft). This event shows the classic signs of a tsunami earthquake as the surface-wave magnitude was very low compared to the moment and tsunami magnitudes, and the tsunami height was far larger than expected for the surface wave magnitude. The very high tsunami magnitude value is due to the sheer strength of the waves. It was calculated by using tsunami run up from Honolulu, Hilo, and the average of stations in California. Even excluding the values given by Hilo (the highest M_{t}), the tsunami magnitude is at least 9.1. The earthquake was originally thought to be a strike-slip earthquake, and later a strike slip earthquake with a normal faulting component. These erroneous focal mechanisms were due to a lack of stations recording the earthquake. However, modeling of the S wave, rather than the P wave helped to uncover both the true magnitude of the earthquake, as well as the widely accepted thrusting mechanism. This thrust mechanism is consistent with a subduction earthquake helping to relieve stress on the Aleutian Trench.

== Tsunami ==
At Unimak Island, tsunami run-up reached 42 m (138 ft). The tsunami earthquake aspect of this event helps to explain a portion of this massive height; however, the rest must be attributed to a local submarine landslide. Waves reportedly traveled across the ocean at 500 miles per hour (430 kn; 800 km/h) and measured 55 feet (17 m) high, crest to trough. The wave reached Kauai, Hawaii 4.5 hours after the quake, and Hilo, Hawaii 4.9 hours after the event. In the Hawaiian Islands 159 people died. In Hilo alone, 96 people died, 163 were injured, 488 buildings were demolished and 936 more were damaged. On Kauai the McKee sugar mill and buildings were demolished, and the archives of the Kauai newspaper were a loss. Witnesses told of waves inundating streets, homes, and storefronts. Many victims were swept out to sea by receding water. The tsunami caused much damage in Maui as well. Waves there demolished 77 homes and many other buildings. The residents of these islands were caught off-guard by the onset of the tsunami due to the inability to transmit warnings from the destroyed posts at Scotch Cap, and the tsunami is known as the April Fools' Day Tsunami in Hawaii because it happened on April 1. The effects of the tsunami also reached Washington, Oregon, and California.

The tsunami was unusually powerful for the size of the earthquake. The event was classified as a tsunami earthquake due to the discrepancy between the size of the tsunami and the relatively low surface-wave magnitude. The large-scale destruction prompted the creation of the Seismic Sea Wave Warning System, which became known as the Pacific Tsunami Warning Center in 1965.

== See also ==
- List of earthquakes in 1946
- List of earthquakes in Alaska
- List of earthquakes in the United States
