= Cashapampa District =

Coordinates: 8°57′10″S 78°02′11″W

Cashapampa
- District
- Interactive map of Cashapampa
- Country: Peru
- Region: Ancash
- Province: Sihuas
- Founded: January 23, 1964
- Capital: Cashapampa

Area
  - Total: 66.96 km^{2} (25.85 sq mi)
- Elevation: 3,425 m (11,237 ft)

Population (2005 census)
  - Total: 3,058
  - Density: 45.67/km^{2} (118.3/sq mi)
- Time zone: UTC-5 (PET)
- UBIGEO: 021904

Cashapampa District is one of ten districts of the Sihuas Province in the Ancash Region of northern Peru.
