= List of earthquakes in France =

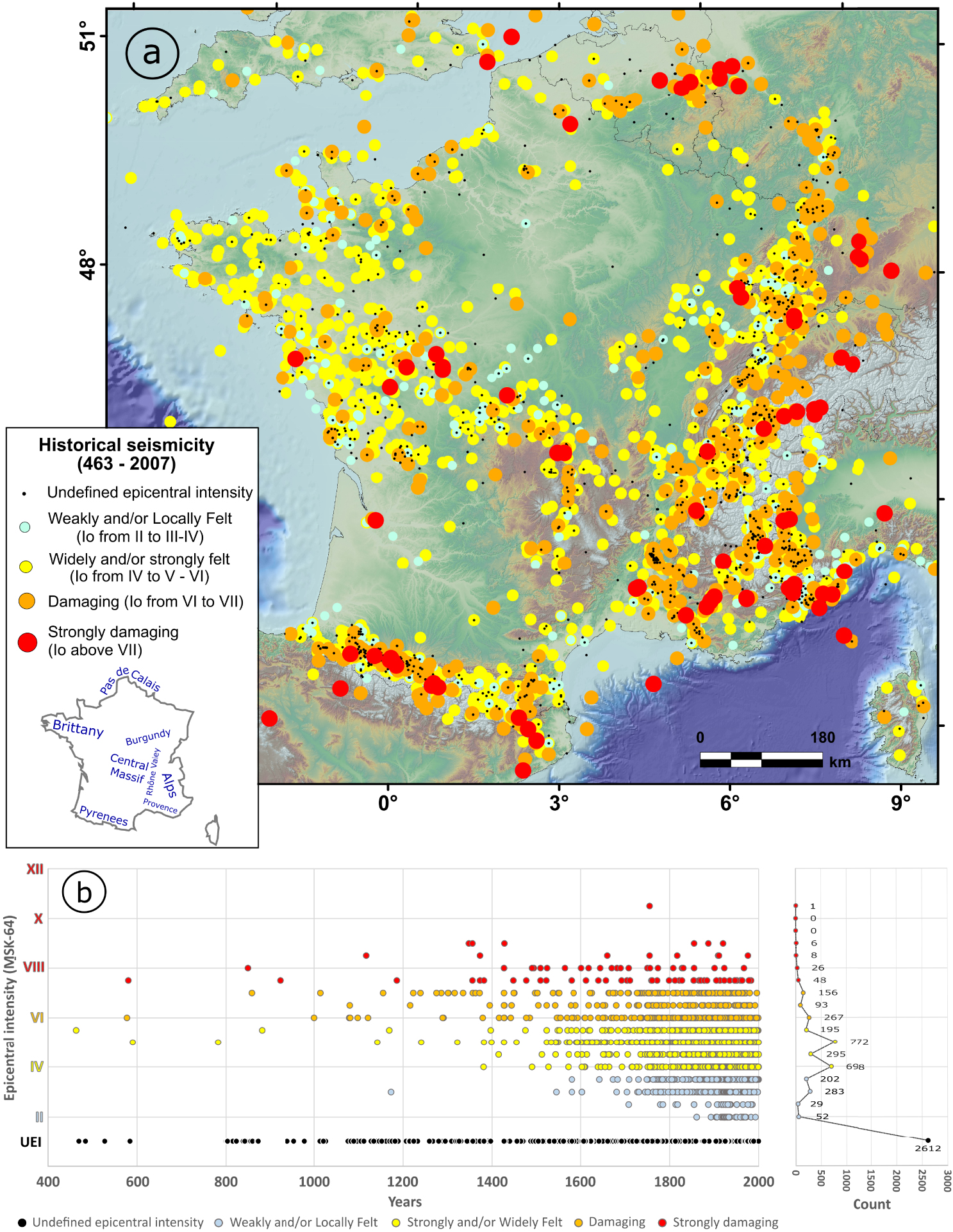
Map of historical earthquake in mainland France, from 463 to 2017

This is a list of earthquakes in France and its overseas territories which directly impacted the country. Earthquakes are rare in mainland France but do occur. Within mainland France, the east of the country Alsace, Jura, Alps, the South-East Alpes-Maritimes, Provence and the Pyrenees are the most concerned, but the most seismically active French regions are parts of Overseas France (such as New Caledonia, Martinique, Guadeloupe, Wallis and Futuna and Réunion). Buildings there are often vulnerable, and much of the population lives at low elevations close to the coast and is exposed to tsunamis.

== Earthquakes ==
Date	Location	Mag.	MMI	Deaths	Injuries	Damage / notes	Ref
2023-06-16	Western France	4.8 M_{w} 5.3–6.0 M_{l}			1	Some buildings damaged	
2022-03-31	New Caledonia	7.0 M_{w}	IV			Small tsunami	
2022-03-12	Auvergne-Rhône-Alpes	4.5 M_{w}	VI			Some buildings damaged	
2021-06-12	Mauritius-Réunion region	6.7 M_{w}	III			No damage, but significantly large.	
2021-02-10	New Caledonia	7.7 M_{w}	IV			Tsunami	
2019-11-11	Auvergne-Rhône-Alpes	4.8 M_{w}	VI		4	Some houses damaged	
2018-12-05	New Caledonia	7.5 M_{w}	VI			Moderate damage/tsunami	
2018-08-29	New Caledonia	7.1 M_{w}	V			Small tsunami	
2018-06-01	Mayotte	4.7 M_{w}	V		6	Part of an earthquake swarm	
2018-05-15	Mayotte	5.9 M_{w}	V		3	Part of an earthquake swarm/Largest ever recorded in the area	
2017-11-19	New Caledonia	7.0 M_{w}	VI			Small tsunami	
2017-02-03	Martinique	5.8 M_{w}	V		1	Some damage	
2016-04-28	Nouvelle-Aquitaine	3.9 M_{w}	IV			Minor damage	
2007-11-29	Martinique	7.4 M_{w}	VII	6	402	Intermediate depth	
2006-11-17	Midi-Pyrénées	4.7 M_{w}	V			Minor damage	
2004-11-21	Guadeloupe	6.3 M_{w}	VIII	1	13		
2003-02-22	Grand Est	5.0 M_{w}	VI				
1996-07-15	Haute-Savoie	5.3 M_{w}			1	Chimney damage	
1993-03-12	Wallis and Futuna	6.4 M_{w}	VII	5	20	Severe damage in Futuna	
1991-02-13	Provence-Alpes-Côte d'Azur	3.8 M_{w}	IV	9		Deaths from avalanche	
1982-01-06	Nouvelle-Aquitaine	4.4 M_{w}	IV			Minor damage	
1972-09-07	Nouvelle-Aquitaine	5.7 M_{w}	VII				
1967-08-13	Pyrénées-Atlantiques	5.1 M_{w}	VI	1	80	Severe damage	
1946-06-25	Valais	6.1 M_{w}	VIII	1		3 deaths in Switzerland/Severe damage	
1909-06-11	Provence	6.0 M_{w}	X	46	250	Severe damage	
1887-02-23	Liguria	6.8–6.9 M_{w}	IX	600–3,000		Destructive tsunami	
1843-02-08	Guadeloupe	8.5 M_{w}	IX	1,500–5,000			
1839-01-11	Martinique	7.5–8.0 M_{w}	IX	390–4,000	28,975	Extreme damage	
1799-01-25	Vendée	6.4–6.5	VIII				
1682-05-12	Savoie		VIII				
1678-09-02	Bouches-du-Rhône	6.0 M_{w}				Severe	
1660-06-21	Hautes-Pyrénées	6.2 M_{L}	VIII–IX	30			
1580-04-06	Dover Straits	5.3–5.9 M_{L}		Many			
1428-02-02	Catalonia	6.7		Hundreds			
1248-11-25	Savoie, Mont Granier			9,000		Deaths caused by landslide.	
1227 February	Provence		X	5,000			
Note: The inclusion criteria for adding events are based on WikiProject Earthquakes' notability guideline that was developed for stand alone articles. The principles described also apply to lists. In summary, only damaging, injurious, or deadly events should be recorded.
