= Hatun Luychu =

Mountain in Peru

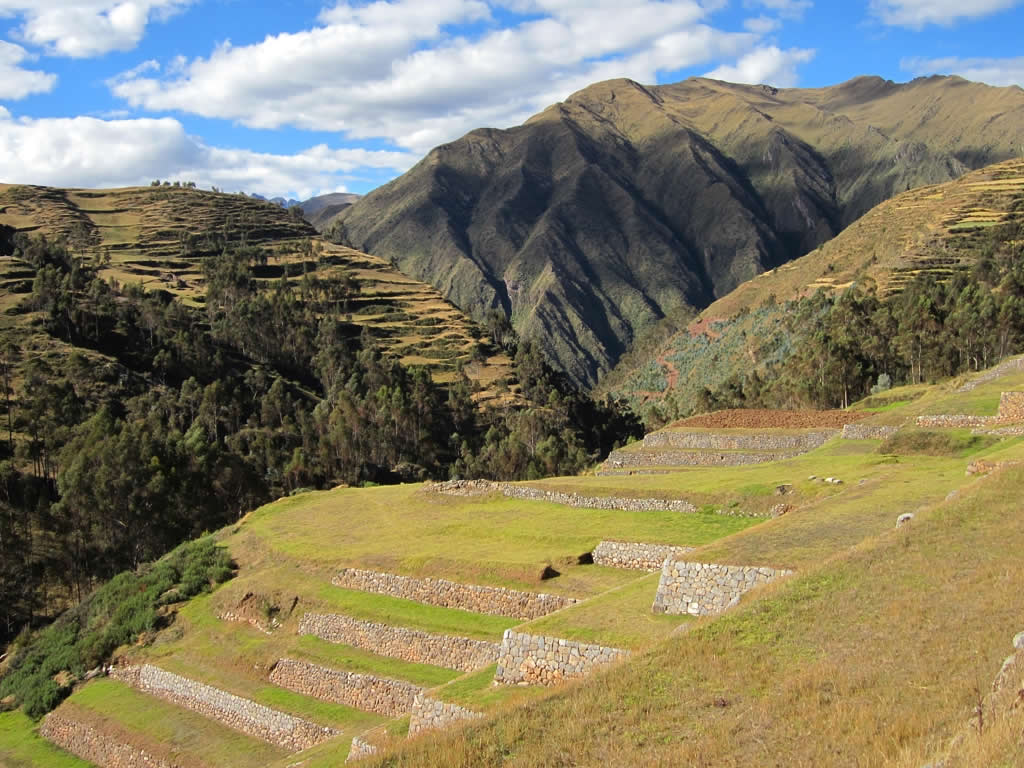
- Hatun Luychu as seen from Chinchero

Highest point
- Elevation: 4,400 m (14,400 ft)
- Coordinates: 13°22′32″S 72°00′26″W

Geography
- Location within Peru
- Location: Cusco, Peru
- Parent range: Andes, Urupampa mountain range

Hatun Luychu (Quechua hatun big, luychu deer, "big deer (mountain)", Hispanicized names Jatumiuicho, Jatumluicho) is a mountain in the Andes of Peru, about 4,400 metres (14,436 ft) high. It lies in the Cusco Region, Urubamba Province, on the border of the districts of Chinchero and Hayllabamba, northeast of Chinchero. The mountain southeast of Hatun Luychu is named Wallata Wachana ("where the Andean goose is born", Hispanicized Huallata Huachana)
