= List of earthquakes in 1946 =

Earthquakes in 1946
Approximate epicenters of the earthquakes in 1946
- 4.0–5.9 magnitude
- 6.0–6.9 magnitude
- 7.0–7.9 magnitude
- 8.0+ magnitude
- Strongest magnitude: United States, south of Unimak Island, Alaska (Magnitude 8.6) April 1
- Deadliest: Dominican Republic, Samaná Bay (Magnitude 7.5) August 4 1,790 deaths
- Total fatalities: 6,373

Number by magnitude
- 9.0+: 0

This is a list of earthquakes in 1946. Only magnitude 6.0 or greater earthquakes appear on the list. Lower magnitude events are included if they have caused death, injury or damage. Events which occurred in remote areas will be excluded from the list as they wouldn't have generated significant media interest. All dates are listed according to UTC time. Several great shocks affected the planet in 1946. The largest was one of the most significant in human terms. The quake itself was a magnitude 8.6 striking on April 1 in Alaska resulting in a tsunami mainly affecting Hawaii. The consequence of this apart from many deaths was the foundation of the Pacific Tsunami Warning Center. This organisation has helped to substantially reduce the death toll of tsunamis in the Pacific, although there have been a few exceptions, including the 2011 Japan event. Japan itself was heavily affected in 1946 by a large quake hitting in December, causing 1,362 deaths. The Dominican Republic was another nation that suffered great destruction in August. Turkey, Peru, and Turkmenistan all saw earthquakes causing many deaths. There were 21 events measuring above 7.0 and three exceeding a magnitude of 8.0.

== Overall ==
=== By death toll ===
Rank	Death toll	Magnitude	Location	MMI	Depth (km)	Date
1	1,790	7.5	Dominican Republic, Samaná Bay	VII (Very strong)	15.0	August 4
2	1,400	6.8	Peru, Ancash Region	XI (Extreme)	15.0	November 10
3	1,362	8.3	Japan, off the south coast of Honshu	VII (Very strong)	15.0	December 20
4	840	6.0	Turkey, Erzurum Province	VIII (Severe)	35.0	May 31
5	400	6.9	Soviet Union, Balkan Region, Turkmenistan	VII (Very strong)	37.9	November 4
6	264	6.0	France, Bordj Bou Arréridj Province, Algeria	IX (Violent)	35.0	February 12
7	167	8.6	United States, south of Unimak Island, Alaska	VII (Very strong)	15.0	April 1
8	75	7.0	Dominican Republic, off the northern coast	VII (Very strong)	15.0	August 8
9	58	6.6	Taiwan, north of Taiwan	IX (Violent)	25.0	December 4
10	12	5.6	Turkey, Konya Province	VIII (Severe)	60.0	February 21

- Note: At least 10 casualties

=== By magnitude ===
Rank	Magnitude	Death toll	Location	MMI	Depth (km)	Date
1	8.6	167	United States, south of Unimak Island, Alaska	VII (Very strong)	15.0	April 1
2	8.3	1,362	Japan, off the south coast of Honshu	VII (Very strong)	15.0	December 20
3	8.0	0	Burma, Sagaing Region	VII (Very strong)	15.0	September 12
= 4	7.8	0	Burma, Sagaing Region	( )	15.0	September 12
= 4	7.8	0	Australia, southeast of New Ireland (island), New Guinea	VI (Strong)	50.0	September 29
= 5	7.5	1,790	Dominican Republic, Samaná Bay	VII (Very strong)	15.0	August 4
= 5	7.5	0	Soviet Union, Jalal-Abad Region, Kyrgyzstan	X (Extreme)	25.0	November 2
= 6	7.3	0	Indonesia, Mentawai Islands	VII (Very strong)	35.0	May 8
= 6	7.3	0	Canada, Vancouver Island	VII (Very strong)	30.0	June 23
= 7	7.2	0	Australia, Morobe Province, Papua New Guinea	( )	95.0	January 17
= 7	7.2	0	Argentina, Santiago del Estero Province	( )	573.6	August 28
= 7	7.2	0	Australia, Morobe Province, Papua New Guinea	( )	110.0	September 23
= 8	7.1	0	Mexico, Oaxaca	( )	109.9	June 7
= 8	7.1	0	Mexico, Veracruz	( )	117.8	July 11
= 9	7.0	0	New Hebrides, Vanuatu	( )	35.0	January 20
= 9	7.0	0	New Hebrides, Vanuatu	( )	175.4	July 9
= 9	7.0	75	Dominican Republic, off the northern coast	VII (Very strong)	15.0	August 8
= 9	7.0	0	Fiji, south of	( )	84.1	August 21
= 9	7.0	0	Fiji, south of	( )	588.4	September 26
= 9	7.0	0	Dominican Republic, La Altagracia Province	( )	50.0	October 4
= 9	7.0	0	United States, Andreanof Islands, Alaska	VI (Strong)	25.0	November 1

- Note: At least 7.0 magnitude

== Notable events ==
=== January ===
January
- Strongest magnitude: 7.2 M_{w} Australia
- Deadliest: 6.0 M_{w} Switzerland; 4 deaths
- Total fatalities: 4

Number by magnitude
- 8.0–8.9: 0
- 7.0–7.9: 2
- 6.0–6.9: 5

Date	Country and location	M_{w}	Depth (km)	MMI	Notes	Casualties	
Date	Country and location	M_{w}	Depth (km)	MMI	Notes	Dead	Injured
5	Guatemala, Quiche Department	6.0	210.0				
5	New Hebrides, Vanuatu	6.9	35.0	VI			
11	Republic of China (1912-1949), Heilongjiang Province	6.8	581.2	II			
12	United States, Gulf of Alaska	6.6	20.0	IV			
17	Australia, Morobe Province, New Guinea	7.2	95.0				
20	New Hebrides, Vanuatu	7.0	35.0				
25	Switzerland, Canton of Bern	6.0	35.0	VIII	The 1946 Valais earthquake killed three people in Switzerland, and one in France.	4	

=== February ===
February
- Strongest magnitude: 6.8 M_{w} United States
- Deadliest: 6.0 M_{w} France; 264 deaths
- Total fatalities: 279

Number by magnitude
- 8.0–8.9: 0
- 7.0–7.9: 0
- 6.0–6.9: 4
- 5.0–5.9: 1

Date	Country and location	M_{w}	Depth (km)	MMI	Notes	Casualties	
Date	Country and location	M_{w}	Depth (km)	MMI	Notes	Dead	Injured
4	United States, Andreanof Islands, Alaska	6.8	160.0				
10	Iran, South Khorasan Province	0.0	0.0	VIII	3 people were killed and some damage was caused. Magnitude and depth unknown.	3	
12	France, Bordj Bou Arreridj Province, Algeria	6.0	35.0	IX	264 deaths were reported as well as major damage.	264	
21	Turkey, Konya Province	5.6	60.0	VIII	12 people were killed.	12	
22	Mexico, Chiapas	6.0	170.0				
27	Argentina, Jujuy Province	6.0	270.0				

=== March ===
March
- Strongest magnitude: 6.8 M_{w} Indonesia
- Total fatalities: 0

Number by magnitude
- 8.0–8.9: 0
- 7.0–7.9: 0
- 6.0–6.9: 3

Date	Country and location	M_{w}	Depth (km)	MMI	Notes	Casualties	
Date	Country and location	M_{w}	Depth (km)	MMI	Notes	Dead	Injured
15	United States, central California	6.3	6.0	VIII			
25	Cuba, southeast of	6.0	35.0				
26	Indonesia, off the west coast of southern Sumatra	6.8	45.0	VI			

=== April ===
April
- Strongest magnitude: 8.6 M_{w} United States
- Deadliest: 8.6 M_{w} United States; 167 deaths
- Total fatalities: 167

Number by magnitude
- 8.0–8.9: 1
- 7.0–7.9: 0
- 6.0–6.9: 1

Date	Country and location	M_{w}	Depth (km)	MMI	Notes	Casualties	
Date	Country and location	M_{w}	Depth (km)	MMI	Notes	Dead	Injured
1	United States, south of Unimak Island, Alaska	8.6	15.0	VII	This was one of the largest events of all time. The 1946 Aleutian Islands earthquake caused a large tsunami that resulted in major destruction on Hawaii. 167 people were killed and property damage was $26 million (1946 rate). The disaster prompted the formation of the Pacific Tsunami Warning Center.	167	
5	Greece, southwest of Crete	6.0	100.0				

=== May ===
May
- Strongest magnitude: 7.3 M_{w} Indonesia
- Deadliest: 6.0 M_{w} Turkey; 840 deaths
- Total fatalities: 840

Number by magnitude
- 8.0–8.9: 0
- 7.0–7.9: 1
- 6.0–6.9: 3

Date	Country and location	M_{w}	Depth (km)	MMI	Notes	Casualties	
Date	Country and location	M_{w}	Depth (km)	MMI	Notes	Dead	Injured
3	Australia, New Ireland (island), New Guinea	6.9	35.0	VII			
8	Indonesia, Mentawai Islands	7.3	35.0	VII			
21	France, east of Martinique	6.3	30.0	V			
31	Turkey, Erzurum Province	6.0	35.0	VIII	840 people were killed.	840	

=== June ===
June
- Strongest magnitude: 7.3 M_{w} Canada
- Total fatalities: 0

Number by magnitude
- 8.0–8.9: 0
- 7.0–7.9: 2
- 6.0–6.9: 7

Date	Country and location	M_{w}	Depth (km)	MMI	Notes	Casualties	
Date	Country and location	M_{w}	Depth (km)	MMI	Notes	Dead	Injured
2	Taiwan, east of	6.3	15.0	V			
7	Mexico, Oaxaca	7.1	109.9				
15	Indonesia, Ceram Sea	6.4	15.0	V			
23	Canada, Vancouver Island	7.3	30.0	VII	1946 Vancouver Island earthquake. Some property damage was caused.		
24	Honduras, Copan Department	6.0	260.0				
24	Indonesia, Banda Sea	6.5	160.0				
26	Guatemala, Sacatepequez Department	6.5	90.0				
26	New Zealand, Canterbury, New Zealand	6.5	15.0	VII			
28	New Zealand, Canterbury, New Zealand	6.0	35.0		Aftershock.		

=== July ===
July
- Strongest magnitude: 7.1 M_{w} Mexico
- Total fatalities: 0

Number by magnitude
- 8.0–8.9: 0
- 7.0–7.9: 2
- 6.0–6.9: 2

Date	Country and location	M_{w}	Depth (km)	MMI	Notes	Casualties	
Date	Country and location	M_{w}	Depth (km)	MMI	Notes	Dead	Injured
9	New Hebrides, Vanuatu	7.0	175.4				
11	Mexico, Veracruz	7.1	117.8				
12	United States, Fox Islands (Alaska)	6.8	100.0				
26	Chile, off coast of Tarapaca Region	6.3	63.5	VI			

=== August ===
August
- Strongest magnitude: 7.5 M_{w} Dominican Republic
- Deadliest: 7.5 M_{w} Dominican Republic; 1,790 deaths
- Total fatalities: 1,867

Number by magnitude
- 8.0–8.9: 0
- 7.0–7.9: 4
- 6.0–6.9: 2

Date	Country and location	M_{w}	Depth (km)	MMI	Notes	Casualties	
Date	Country and location	M_{w}	Depth (km)	MMI	Notes	Dead	Injured
2	Chile, Atacama Region	6.9	39.2	VII	2 people were killed and major damage was caused.	2	
4	Dominican Republic, Samana Bay	7.5	15.0	VII	The 1946 Dominican Republic earthquake was one of the worst disasters to hit the country. The earthquake caused few deaths however a major tsunami left 1,790 people dead. Many homes were destroyed.	1,790	
8	Dominican Republic, north coast	7.0	15.0	VII	This was a large aftershock of the previous event. 75 further deaths were caused by a tsunami.	75	
11	United Kingdom, Solomon Islands	6.5	20.0				
21	Fiji, south of	7.0	84.1				
28	Argentina, Santiago del Estero Province	7.2	573.6				

=== September ===
September
- Strongest magnitude: 8.0 M_{w} Burma
- Total fatalities: 0

Number by magnitude
- 8.0–8.9: 1
- 7.0–7.9: 4
- 6.0–6.9: 1

Date	Country and location	M_{w}	Depth (km)	MMI	Notes	Casualties	
Date	Country and location	M_{w}	Depth (km)	MMI	Notes	Dead	Injured
12	Burma, Sagaing Region	8.0	15.0	VII	1946 Sagaing Earthquake		
12	Burma, Sagaing Region	7.8	15.0		Aftershock.		
23	Australia, Morobe Province, New Guinea	7.2	110.0				
26	Fiji, south of	7.0	588.4				
29	Australia, southeast of New Ireland (island), New Guinea	7.8	50.0	VI			
30	Peru, Ica Region	6.1	53.0	VII	Many homes were damaged.		

=== October ===
October
- Strongest magnitude: 7.0 M_{w} Dominican Republic
- Total fatalities: 0

Number by magnitude
- 8.0–8.9: 0
- 7.0–7.9: 1
- 6.0–6.9: 7

Date	Country and location	M_{w}	Depth (km)	MMI	Notes	Casualties	
Date	Country and location	M_{w}	Depth (km)	MMI	Notes	Dead	Injured
2	Soviet Union, southern Kamchatka Krai, Russia	6.5	38.2	VI			
2	Soviet Union, southern Kamchatka Krai, Russia	6.3	34.3		Aftershock.		
4	Dominican Republic, La Altagracia Province	7.0	50.0				
8	Fiji, south of	6.8	620.0				
13	Bolivia, Potosi Department	6.0	200.0				
22	New Hebrides, Vanuatu	6.8	200.7				
25	Soviet Union, eastern Kamchatka Krai, Russia	6.5	140.0				
30	United States, south of Unimak Island, Alaska	6.5	30.0				

=== November ===
November
- Strongest magnitude: 7.5 M_{w} Soviet Union
- Deadliest: 6.8 M_{w} Peru; 1,400 deaths
- Total fatalities: 1,800

Number by magnitude
- 8.0–8.9: 0
- 7.0–7.9: 2
- 6.0–6.9: 7

Date	Country and location	M_{w}	Depth (km)	MMI	Notes	Casualties	
Date	Country and location	M_{w}	Depth (km)	MMI	Notes	Dead	Injured
1	United States, Andreanof Islands, Alaska	7.0	25.0	VI			
2	Soviet Union, Jalal-Abad Region, Kyrgyzstan	7.5	25.0	X	The 1946 Chatkal earthquake caused some damages to Central Asia.		
4	Soviet Union, Balkan Region, Turkmenistan	6.9	37.9	VII	400 people were killed and major damage was caused.	400	
6	India, Leh	6.4	25.0	VII			
10	Argentina, San Juan Province, Argentina	6.2	120.0				
10	Peru, Ancash Region	6.8	15.0	XI	1,400 people were killed and major damage was caused by the 1946 Ancash earthquake.	1,400	
12	Tonga	6.9	15.0				
17	Indonesia, Banda Sea	6.5	100.0				
28	Tonga	6.9	265.0				

=== December ===
December
- Strongest magnitude: 8.3 M_{w} Japan
- Deadliest: 8.3 M_{w} Japan; 1,362 deaths
- Total fatalities: 1,420

Number by magnitude
- 8.0–8.9: 1
- 7.0–7.9: 0
- 6.0–6.9: 5

Date	Country and location	M_{w}	Depth (km)	MMI	Notes	Casualties	
Date	Country and location	M_{w}	Depth (km)	MMI	Notes	Dead	Injured
4	Taiwan, north of	6.6	25.0	IX	The 1946 Hsinhua earthquake left 58 people dead and 384 injured. 700 homes were destroyed.	58	384
17	Fiji	6.5	580.0				
19	Taiwan, east of	6.8	98.0				
20	Japan, off the south coast of Honshu	8.3	15.0	VII	The 1946 Nankai earthquake was one of the largest quakes to hit Japan. The south coast is vulnerable to Nankai megathrust earthquakes. 1,362 people were killed and 2,600 were injured. 36,000 homes were destroyed. A tsunami washed the shoreline contributing to the devastation with wave heights around 20 feet.	1,362	2,600
21	Soviet Union, east of Kuril Islands, Russia	6.9	20.0				
25	United States, Rat Islands, Alaska	6.5	90.0				
