= Yanacocha (Urubamba) =

Lake in Cusco, Peru

- Location within Peru
- Location: Peru; Cusco Region, Urubamba Province
- Coordinates: 13°17′06″S 72°03′01″W
- Max. length: 240 m (790 ft)
- Average depth: 14 m (46 ft)
- Surface elevation: 3,951 metres (12,963 ft)

Yanacocha (possibly from Quechua yana black, very dark, qucha lake, lagoon, "black lake") is a lake in Peru located in Huaylllabamba District, Urubamba Province, Cusco Region. It is about 14 m (46 ft) deep and 240 m (790 ft) long and it is situated at a height of about 3,951 metres (12,963 ft). Yanacocha as well as the nearby lakes named Chaquicocha and Kellococha (Quechua for "yellow lake") is known for its woods of polylepis. It is situated high up on the mountain named Chaquicocha.

== See also ==
- Machu Qullqa
