= Machu Colca =

Archaeological site in Peru

- Machu Qollqa
- Machu Qolqa
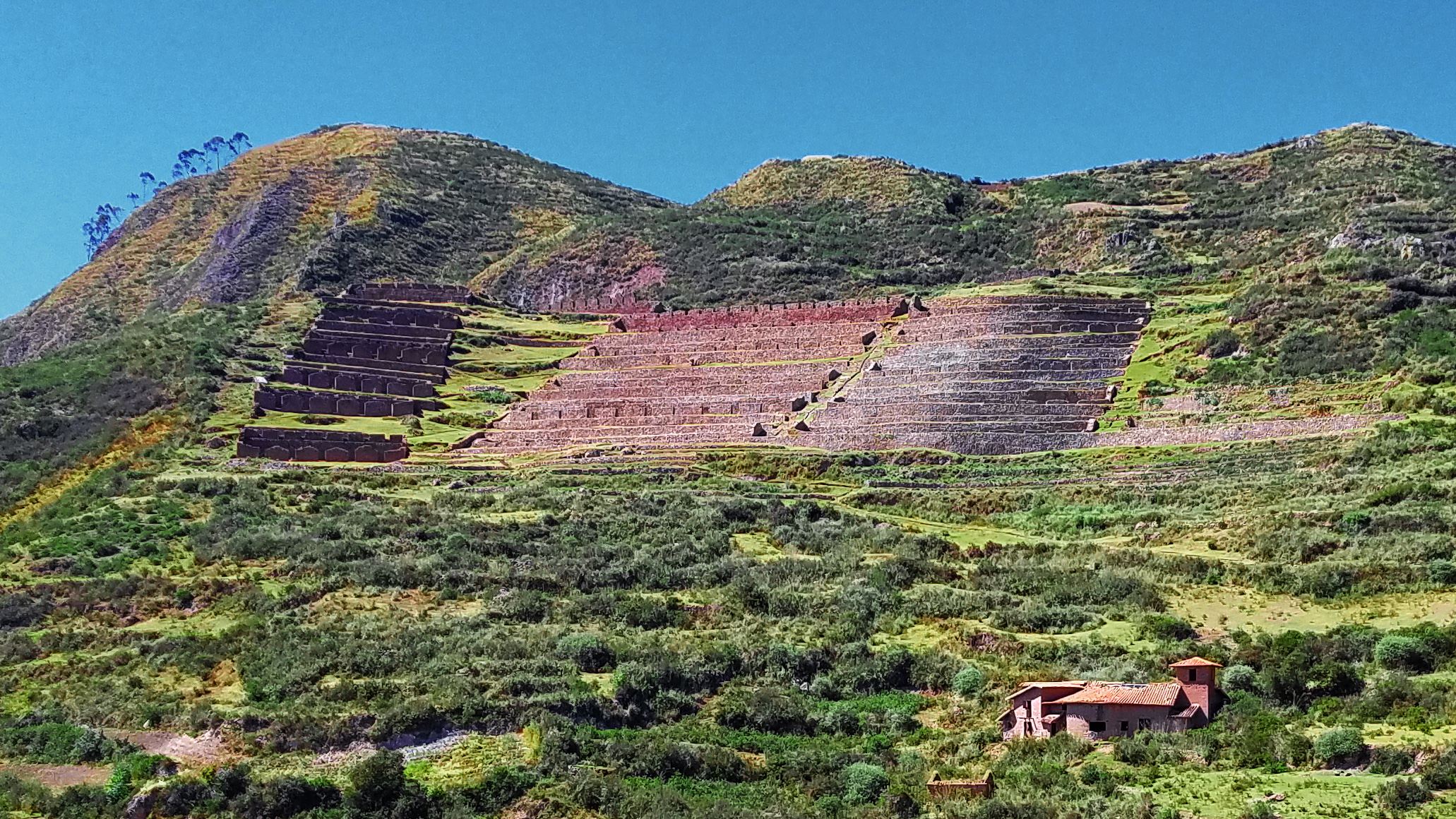
- Machu Colca in 2019
- Interactive map of Machu Colca
- 13°21′48″S 72°03′49″W
- Cultures: Inca Civilization
- Location: Urubamba Province, Cusco

Machu Colca, Machuqolqa or Machu Qollqa (from Quechua machu old, old person, qullqa, qulqa deposit, storehouse) is an archeological site in Peru. It lies in the Cusco Region, Urubamba Province, Huayllabamba District, a few minutes outside of Chinchero. Machu Colca is situated at about 3,850 metres (12,631 ft) of elevation, above the left bank of the Urubamba River, near the village of Raqch'i (Raqchi).

The archeological site features 14 terraces with partial buildings, while the adjacent parking lot is lined with small handicraft stores and a Zip line park.

== See also ==
- List of archaeological sites in Peru
- Chinchero District
- Kellococha
- Yanacocha
