= Sicsibamba District =

Coordinates: 8°37′59″S 77°36′00″W

Sicsibamba
- District
- Interactive map of Sicsibamba
- Country: Peru
- Region: Ancash
- Province: Sihuas
- Founded: November 6, 1909
- Capital: Umbe

Area
  - Total: 86 km^{2} (33 sq mi)
- Elevation: 3,120 m (10,240 ft)

Population (2005 census)
  - Total: 2,044
  - Density: 24/km^{2} (62/sq mi)
- Time zone: UTC-5 (PET)
- UBIGEO: 021910

Sicsibamba District is one of ten districts of the Sihuas Province in Peru.
