= Ragash District =

Coordinates: 8°32′43″S 77°39′50″W

Ragash
- District
- Interactive map of Ragash
- Country: Peru
- Region: Ancash
- Province: Sihuas
- Founded: December 12, 1963
- Capital: Ragash

Area
  - Total: 208.45 km^{2} (80.48 sq mi)
- Elevation: 3,500 m (11,500 ft)

Population (2005 census)
  - Total: 2,745
  - Density: 13.17/km^{2} (34.11/sq mi)
- Time zone: UTC-5 (PET)
- UBIGEO: 021908

Ragash District is one of ten districts of the Sihuas Province in Peru.

== Geography ==
One of the highest peaks of the district is Parya Chuku at approximately 4,400 m (14,400 ft). Other mountains are listed below:

- Chawpi Qaqa
- Chunta Pampa
- Ch'uru Pampa
- Kushuru Pampa
- Kushuru Pata
- Minas
- Misa Pata
- Pistaq
- Qantu Hirka
- Quyllur Qucha Pampa
- Q'illa Hirka
- Rima Pampa
- Rima Rima
- Tampu
- Wiru Kancha
- Wisk'acha Ranra

Some of the small lakes in the district are Asul Qucha, Ch'aki Qucha, Ch'ampa Qucha, Muru Qucha, Rima Qucha, Utkhu Qucha, Waka Qucha, Waswa Qucha and Wathiya Qucha.
