= Chingalpo District =

Coordinates: 8°20′41″S 77°32′15″W

Chingalpo
- District
- Interactive map of Chingalpo
- Country: Peru
- Region: Ancash
- Province: Sihuas
- Founded: June 14, 1958
- Capital: Chingalpo

Area
  - Total: 173.2 km^{2} (66.9 sq mi)
- Elevation: 3,128 m (10,262 ft)

Population (2005 census)
  - Total: 1,140
  - Density: 6.58/km^{2} (17.0/sq mi)
- Time zone: UTC-5 (PET)
- UBIGEO: 021905

Chingalpo District is one of ten districts of the Sihuas Province in the Ancash Region of northern Peru.
