= Kellococha (Cusco) =

Lake in Peru

- Laguna Chaquicocha
- Location within Peru Location within South America
- Location: Peru; Cusco Region, Urubamba Province
- Coordinates: 13°16′40″S 72°02′59″W

Kellococha (possibly from Quechua q'illu yellow, qucha lake, lagoon, "yellow lake"), also spelled Kellococha, Kelloccocha, Quellococha, also Qellococha, Qelloqocha, Q'elloqocha, is a lake in Peru located in the Cusco Region, Urubamba Province, Huaylllabamba District. Kellococha is known for its woods of polylepis which also occur at the neighboring lake named Yanacocha.

== See also ==
- Machu Qullqa
