= 1584 Aigle earthquake =

Earthquake in Switzerland

- Location within Switzerland
- Local date: 11 March 1584
- Local time: 23:00–23:30
- Magnitude: 5.9–6.4 M_{w}
- Epicenter: 46.33°N 6.97°E
- Areas affected: Switzerland
- Max. intensity: MMI VIII (Severe)
- Tsunami: Yes
- Landslides: Yes
- Casualties: 320 fatalities

The 1584 Aigle earthquake occurred on 11 March at 23:00–23:30 local time in Switzerland. The earthquake had a moment magnitude of 5.9–6.4 and maximum Modified Mercalli intensity of VIII (Severe). The shock generated a tsunami in Lake Geneva. It was followed by 25 aftershocks in the following days. An aftershock on 14 March triggered a large rockslide that killed 320 people.

== Geology ==
The Swiss Plateau which encompasses the cantons of Bern, Valais, Zurich, Vaud and Basel-Stadt lies in one of the most earthquake-prone regions of Switzerland. Seismicity in Switzerland is related to the formation of the Alps caused by the collision between the European and African plates.

== Earthquake ==
The moment magnitude (M_{w}) was estimated at between 5.9 and 6.4. Aftershocks occurred on 11, 12, 13, and 14 March. The strong aftershock on 14 March had an estimated M_{w} of 5.4.

== Damage and casualties ==
Damage was mostly documented in localities along the northeastern shore of Lake Geneva and spanned the areas of Vevey, Villeneuve, Aigle, and Montreux. Damage occurred in towns, castles, hamlets, villages and cottages. Most building damage consisted cracked walls and toppled chimneys. A clergy house and church collapsed. The Chillon Castle's interior walls were extensively cracked, towers split and outer retaining walls at the waterside toppled. Damage to the castle required immediate repairs. The roof of a tower, battlements and portions of its façade were repaired. In villages near the castle, several old buildings collapsed.

The vault in the Church of Glion near Montreux collapsed and killed one and injuring wounding several. This description documented the only shaking-related casualties in the earthquake. Buildings also collapsed in Lausanne, Geneva, Saanen, Rougemont and Les Ormonts. In Aigle, close to the epicenter, 50–60 chimneys were destroyed but no major damage occurred. About 10 km (6.2 mi) to the south in Bex, the spiral staircase in an asylum was unsuitable for use. In Canton Valais, a rockfall seriously damaged the Church of Saint Maurice.

At least 320 people and hundreds of livestock died on 14 March during a rockfall triggered on Tour d'Aï. An aftershock is thought to have triggered the rockfall. It nearly completely buried the villages of Corbeyrier and Yvorne. At least 69 homes were destroyed, 126 barns and 5 mills. The landslide had initially been triggered by the mainshock from the mountain and came to a rest on the plateau. It was reactivated by the aftershock.

== Tsunami ==
A tsunami and seiche occurred in the eastern portion of Lake Geneva. Waves damaged vineyards at the lakeshore. Parts of Villeneuve, Lausanne and Geneva near the lakeshore were flooded. The Rhône River was drained. Historical documentation described "stormy waters" and difference between highest and lowest water level at "more than five feet". The tsunami may have been the result of an underwater slump at the Rhone River delta. About 3,000–7,000 m^{2} (32,000–75,000 sq ft) of vineyard was lost near Montreux. The slump had estimated dimensions of 2,500 m (8,200 ft) long × 900 m (3,000 ft) wide × 15 m (49 ft) thick (30,000,000 m^{3} (1.1×10^{9} cu ft)).

== See also ==
- List of earthquakes in Switzerland
