= Quiches District =

Coordinates: 8°25′01″S 77°27′00″W

- District
- Interactive map of Quiches District
- Country: Peru
- Region: Ancash
- Province: Sihuas
- Founded: October 7, 1914
- Capital: Quiches

Area
  - Total: 146.98 km^{2} (56.75 sq mi)
- Elevation: 3,012 m (9,882 ft)

Population (2005 census)
  - Total: 2,809
  - Density: 19.11/km^{2} (49.50/sq mi)
- Time zone: UTC-5 (PET)
- UBIGEO: 021907

Quiches District is one of ten districts of the Sihuas Province in the Ancash Region of northern Peru.
