= Alfonso Ugarte District =

Coordinates: 8°34′35″S 77°37′51″W

Alfonso Ugarte Ullulluku
- District
- Interactive map of Alfonso Ugarte
- Country: Peru
- Region: Ancash
- Province: Sihuas
- Founded: March 27, 1953
- Capital: Ullulluco

Area
  - Total: 80.71 km^{2} (31.16 sq mi)
- Elevation: 3,205 m (10,515 ft)

Population (2005 census)
  - Total: 905
  - Density: 11.2/km^{2} (29.0/sq mi)
- Time zone: UTC-5 (PET)
- UBIGEO: 021903

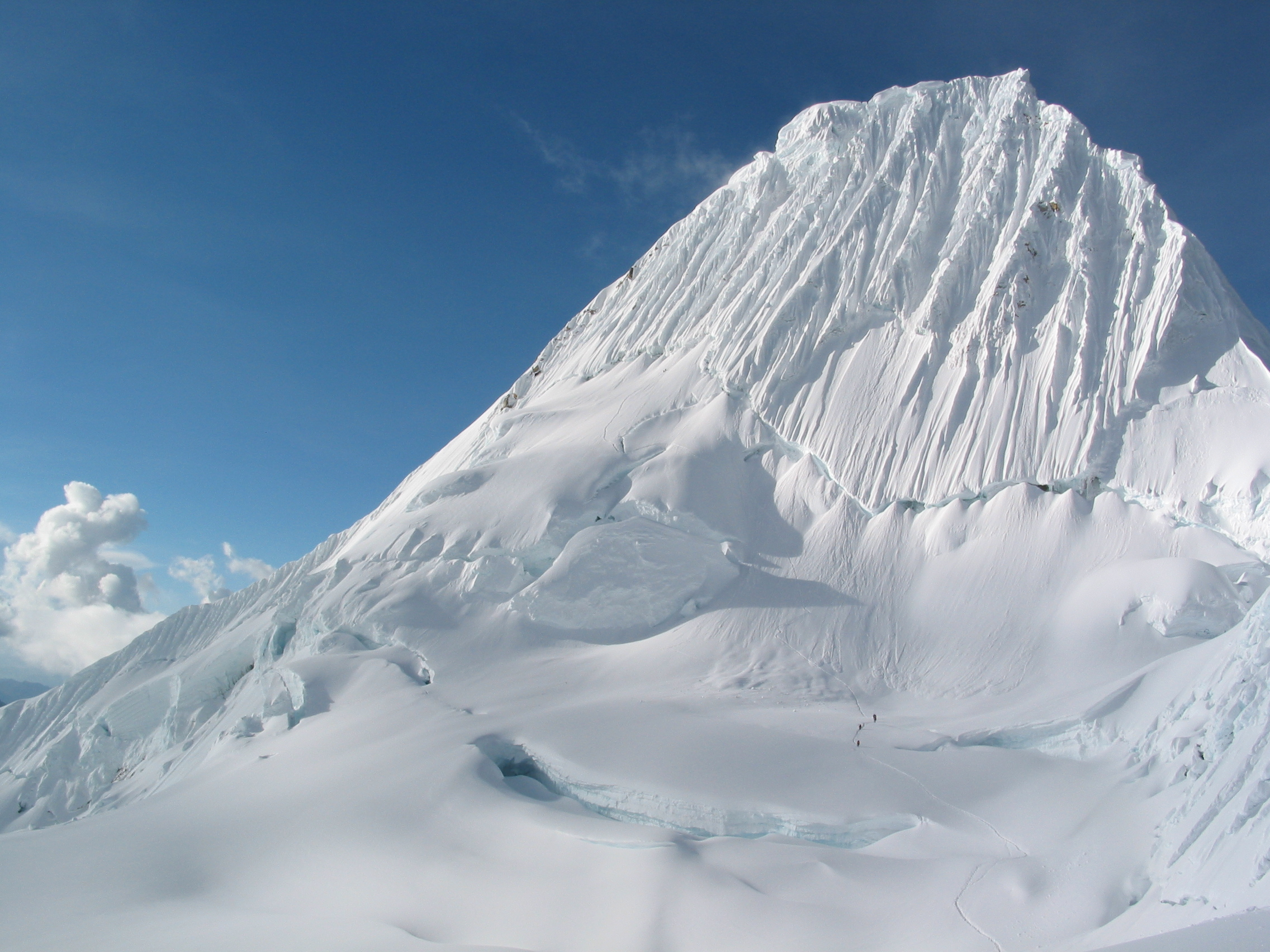
Climbers on Alpamayo mountain in Peru

Alfonso Ugarte District is one of ten districts of the Sihuas Province in the Ancash Region of northern Peru.

== See also ==
- Pilanku
- Qulluta
