= 1946 Hsinhua earthquake =

Earthquake in Taiwan

- Location within Taiwan
- UTC time: 1946-12-04 22:46:53
- ISC event: 898682
- USGS-ANSS: ComCat
- Local date: December 5, 1946
- Local time: 06:47
- Magnitude: 6.1 M_{L}
- Depth: 5 km (3.1 mi)
- Epicenter: 23.1°N 120.3°E
- Areas affected: Taiwan, Republic of China
- Max. intensity: MMI IX (Violent)
- Casualties: 74 dead

The 1946 Hsinhua earthquake (Chinese: 1946年新化大地震; pinyin: 1946 nián Xīnhuà dà dìzhèn), also referred to as the 1946 Tainan earthquake (Chinese: 1946年台南大地震; pinyin: 1946 nián Táinán dà dìzhèn) was a magnitude 6.1 earthquake which hit Tainan County (now part of Tainan City), Taiwan, on 5 December 1946, at 06:47. The quake claimed 74 lives and was the eighth deadliest earthquake in twentieth century Taiwan.

== Earthquake ==
The 6.1 M_{L} earthquake struck at 06:47 CST on Thursday 5 December 1946, as people in the area were waking up and preparing breakfast. The epicentre was in Hsinhua in the centre of Tainan County at a relatively shallow depth of 5 kilometres (3 mi); the rupture responsible was the Hsinhua fault (Chinese: 新化斷層; pinyin: Xīnhuà duàncéng). Government geologists in Taiwan believe this fault may have been active a number of times during the (current) Holocene era. There was one major aftershock, on December 17, which measured 5.7 on the Richter scale but caused no additional casualties.

== Damage ==
According to Taiwan's Central Weather Bureau, there were 74 people killed by the quake, with 200 people seriously injured and 274 lightly injured. 1,971 dwellings were completely destroyed, while a further 2,084 dwellings were partially destroyed. Soil liquefaction and sand boils were observed in central Tainan County, and there was widespread damage to railways, roads, farmland, water pipes and bridges. As the disaster came just a year into the new Kuomintang rule in Taiwan, it served as a test for the new government. It was the most serious earthquake in Tainan County in 84 years.

== See also ==
- List of earthquakes in 1946
- List of earthquakes in Taiwan
