= List of earthquakes in Switzerland =

This is a list of earthquakes in Switzerland:

== Earthquakes ==
Date (UTC)	Location	Mag.	MMI	Deaths	Injuries	Comments
1295	Churwalden	6.5±0.5	VIII			M_{w}
1356	Basel	6.7–7.1	X	300		M_{w}
1524	Ardon	5.8	VIII			Damaging
1584	Aigle	5.9	VIII	320		Triggered a tsunami in Lake Geneva. Most deaths associated with a M_{w} 5.4 aftershock which triggered a rockfall.
1601	Unterwalden	6.2	VIII	9		Triggered a tsunami in Lake Lucerne.
1755	Sierre	6.1	VIII			M_{w}
1855	Visp	6.4	VIII	1		M_{w} Only casualty was a person killed by rockfall.
1946	Sierre	6.2	VIII	4		Destructive and one death in France. Rockslides.
Note: Only damaging, injurious, or deadly events should be recorded.
