= 1356 Basel earthquake =

6.0–7.1 MW earthquake in Switzerland

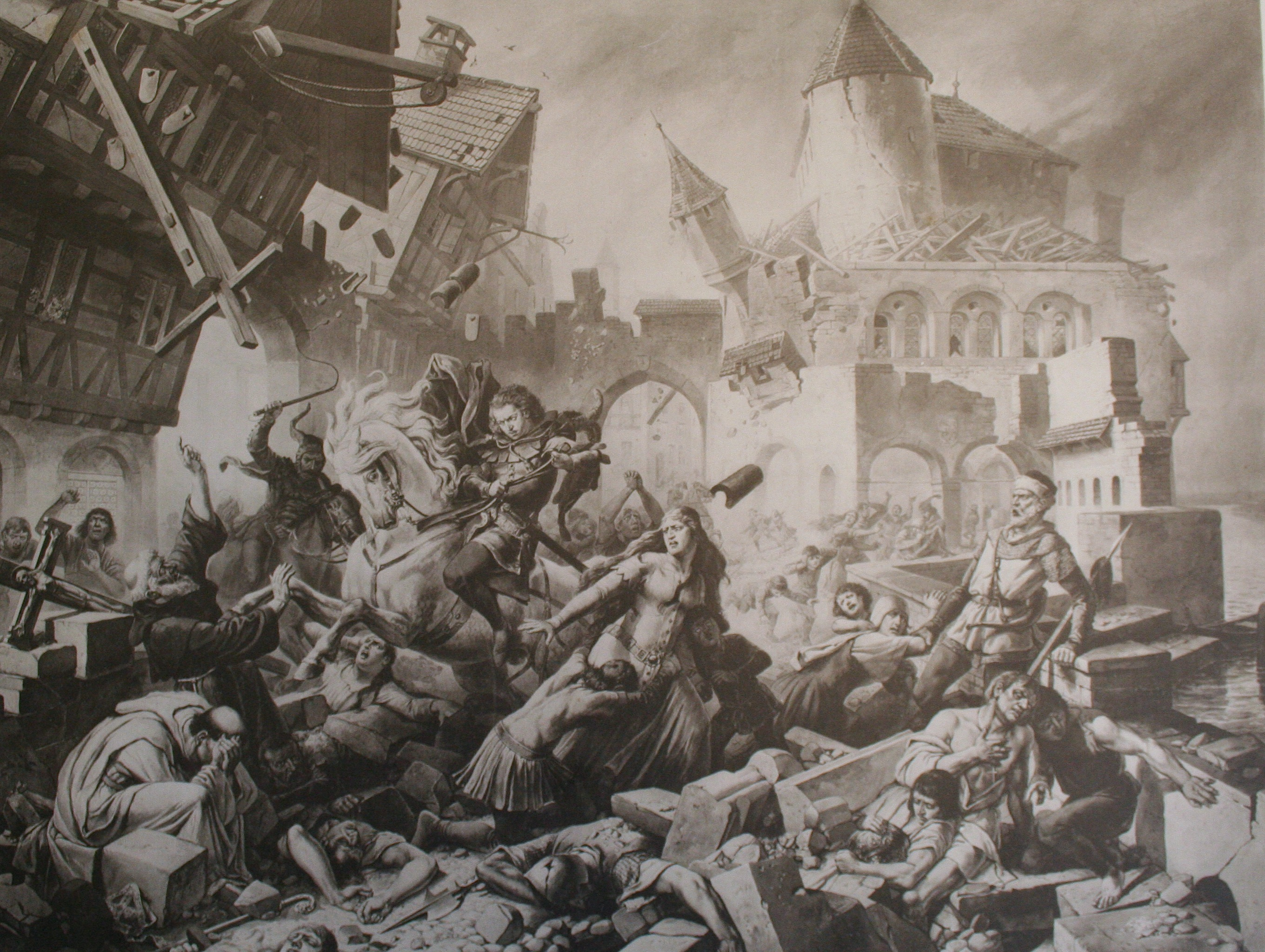
- Basel earthquake as envisioned by Karl Jauslin

- Location within Switzerland
- Local date: 18 October 1356
- Local time: 22:00
- Magnitude: 6.0–7.1 M_{w}
- Epicenter: 47.5°N 7.6°E
- Areas affected: Basel, Prince-Bishopric of Basel
- Max. intensity: MSK-64 IX (Destructive) – MSK-64 X (Devastating)

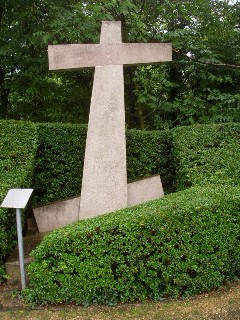
Erdbebenkreuz ("Earthquake cross") in Reinach

The 1356 Basel earthquake is the most significant seismological event to have occurred in Central Europe in recorded history and had a moment magnitude in the range of 6.0–7.1. This earthquake, which occurred on 18 October 1356, is also known as the Sankt-Lukas-Tag Erdbeben (English: Saint Luke's Day Earthquake), as 18 October is the feast day of Saint Luke the Evangelist.

== Earthquake ==
After a foreshock between 19:00 and 20:00 local time, the main earthquake struck at around 22:00, and numerous aftershocks followed through that night. Basel experienced a second, very violent shock in the middle of the night. The town within the ramparts was destroyed by a fire when torches and candles falling to the floor set the wooden houses ablaze. The number of deaths within the town of Basel is estimated at 300. All major churches and castles within a 30 km (19 mi) radius of Basel were destroyed.

The seismic crisis lasted a year. The modeling of the macroseismic data suggests that the earthquake's source had an east–west orientation, a direction corresponding with the overlapping faults in the Jura Mountains. On the other hand, recent paleoseismic studies attribute the cause of this earthquake to a normal fault, oriented NNE-SSW and south of the town. The significant magnitude of the event suggests a possible extension of this fault under the town.

=== Location ===
Due to the limited records of the event, a variety of epicenters have been proposed for the earthquake. Some of the proposed locations include faults beneath the Jura Mountains or along the Basel-Reinach escarpment. Another study placed the epicenter 10 km (6.2 mi) south of Basel.

=== Intensity ===
The earthquake was felt as far away as Zurich, Konstanz, and even in Île-de-France. The maximum intensity registered on the Medvedev–Sponheuer–Karnik scale was IX–X (Destructive–Devastating). The macroseismic map was established on the basis of damage reported by the region's 30 to 40 castles.

From this macroseismic data, various studies have been conducted to estimate the moment magnitude of the earthquake, which have resulted in various values of 6.2 (BRGM 1998); 6.0 (GEO-TER 2002); 6.9 (SED 2004) with a follow-up report suggesting a range of between 6.7 and 7.1; 6.6 (GFZ 2006); and a major Swiss study by 21 European experts, with American involvement, in which four sub-groups estimated values of 6.9, 6.9, 6.5 to 6.9, and 6.5 ± 0.5 (PEGASOS 2002–2004). There are also different opinions about where the fault lies.

=== Damage ===
The earthquake destroyed the city of Basel, Switzerland, near the southern end of the Upper Rhine Graben, and caused much destruction in a vast region extending from Paris to Prague. Though major earthquakes are common at the seismically active edges of tectonic plates in Turkey, Greece, and Italy, intraplate earthquakes are rare events in Central Europe. According to the Swiss Seismological Service, of more than 10,000 earthquakes in Switzerland over the past 800 years, only half a dozen of them have registered more than 6.0 on the Richter scale.

== See also ==
- 1356 Lisbon earthquake
- Fessenheim Nuclear Power Plant
- Induced seismicity in Basel
- List of earthquakes in Switzerland
- List of historical earthquakes
