= Sihuas province =

Coordinates: 8.567°S 77.617°W

Sihuas
- Province
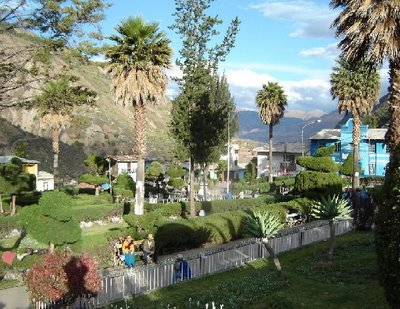
- The town Sihuas, seat of the province

- Coat of arms

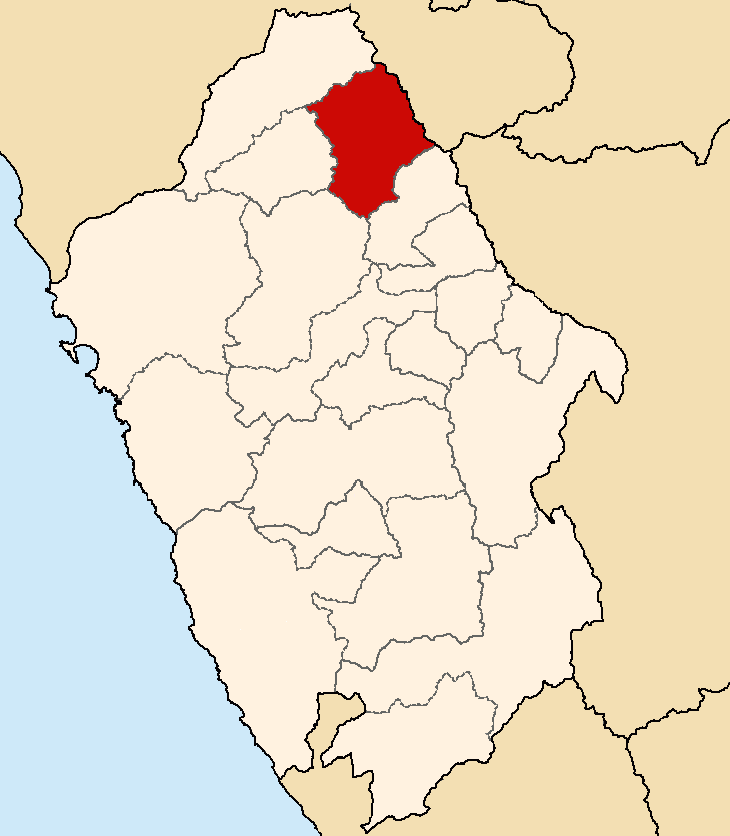
- Location of Sihuas in the Ancash Region
- Country: Peru
- Region: Ancash
- Capital: Sihuas

Area
  - Total: 1,455.97 km^{2} (562.15 sq mi)

Population
  - Total: 30,849
  - Density: 21.188/km^{2} (54.877/sq mi)
- UBIGEO: 0219
- Website: www.munisihuas.gob.pe

Sihuas (Quechua Siwas) is one of twenty provinces of the Ancash Region in Peru.This province was created by Law nº 13485, dated at January 9, 1961, when Manuel Prado was president of Peru. It is bordered by provinces of Huaylas and Corongo on the west, Pallasca on the north, La Libertad Region on the east, and Pomabamba on the south.

== Geography ==
One of the highest peaks of the district is Puka Qaqa at approximately 4,400 m (14,400 ft). Other mountains are listed below:

- Aya K'uchu
- Chawpi Qaqa
- Hatun Anqas
- Hatun Hirka
- Kiswar
- Kuntur Wasi
- Kushuru Pampa
- Kushuru Pata
- Mach'ay Wayi
- Minas Hirka
- Minas Pampa
- Misa Pata
- Ñawin Qucha
- Pilanku
- Pukara
- Punta Hirka
- Putaqa
- Q'ala Marka
- Qulluta
- Raqay Qucha
- Rima Pampa
- Silla Hirka
- Sumaq Pampa
- Suyru Pampa
- Tuku Mach'ay
- Uqa Chakra
- Waraqayuq
- Wathiyana Hirka
- Wathiyayuq
- Wayanay
- Waychu Mach'ay
- Wiru Kancha
- Yawar Qucha

== Political division ==
Sihuas is divided into ten districts, which are:

- Acobamba
- Alfonso Ugarte
- Cashapampa
- Chingalpo
- Huayllabamba
- Quiches
- Ragash
- San Juan
- Sicsibamba
- Sihuas

== Ethnic groups ==
The province is inhabited by indigenous citizens of Quechua descent. Spanish is the language which the majority of the population (62.89%) learnt to speak in childhood, 36.83% of the residents started speaking using the Quechua language (2007 Peru Census).

== Earthquake of November 10, 1946 ==
On November 10, 1946, a magnitude 7.3 earthquake struck the province. The epicenter is estimated to have occurred at 8°20' S. 77°50' W. at a depth of 30 – 40 km. The surface fault was observed to run about 18 km northwest from Quiches toward Conchucos. The quake was "the first well-observed instance of major faulting." The fault was purely slip-dip (vertical), with an offset of as much as 3.5 meters (11 feet). The quake and resulting landslides resulted in a death toll estimated at 1400 - 1700, a substantial number given the sparse population in the area. The village of Acobamba was buried by one landslide, killing 217.

== Main events ==
- January: Anniversary Province
- August: Our Lady of the Snow
- October: Lord of Miracles

== Sources ==
- Historic Earthquakes
- Alexander E. Gates and David Ritchie, Encyclopedia of Earthquakes and Volcanoes, Third Ed. (New York, Facts on File, Inc. 2007) p. 10 available at Scribd
