= Rockslide of Elm =

1881 mining disaster in Elm, Canton of Glarus, Switzerland

Coordinates: 46.9132°N 9.1814°E

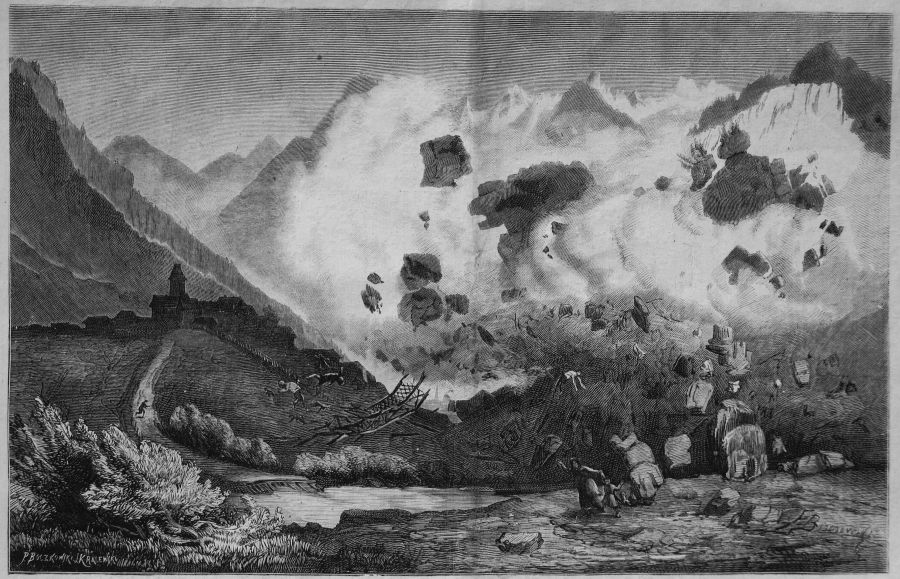
The rockslide of Elm. Wood engraving by Paweł Boczkowski, 1881

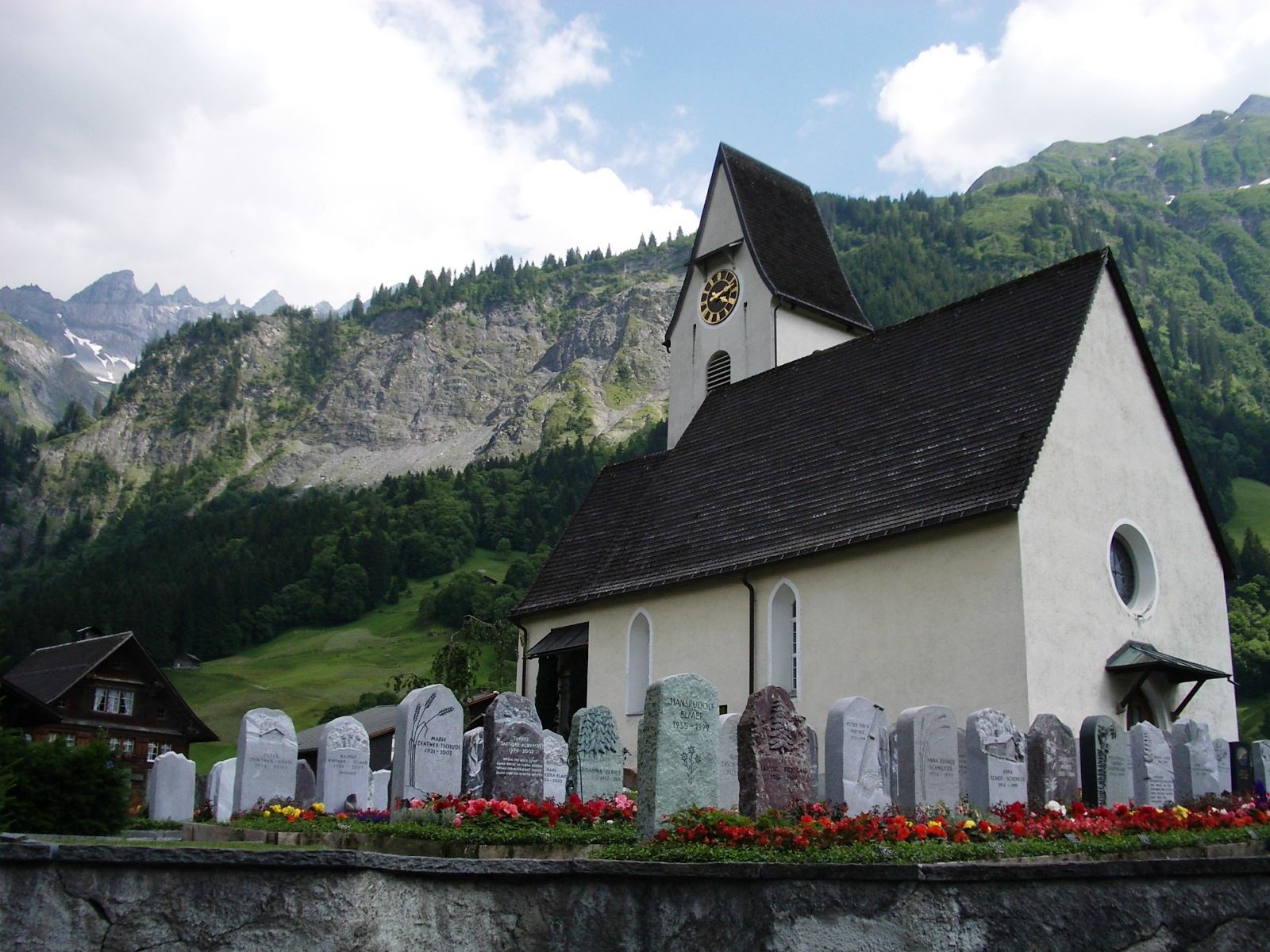
Church of Elm, with the site of the rock slide at the left

The rockslide of Elm (German: Der Bergsturz von Elm) was a mining disaster in Elm, Canton of Glarus, Switzerland which killed 115 people and destroyed 83 buildings on 11 September 1881. The catastrophe was partially caused by the mining of slate, beginning after 1870, by impoverished farmers who sought an additional source of income. Being inexperienced with proper mining techniques, they destabilized the rock face until the final catastrophe.

The miners undercut the mountain face to a breadth of 180 m, and already in 1878 first rock movements occurred. A geological commission to examine the increasing number of rockfalls visited the scene shortly before the catastrophe, but did not find any indications of an impending disaster.

The loud noise of the rockfalls, break-offs and fractures were already heard during the Sunday service on the morning of 11 September 1881. In spite of this, next to nobody left the dangerous area – in fact, many spectators went to the affected area or climbed to the nearby hamlet Düniberg on the opposing face of the valley in the hope of enjoying a better view of the spectacle.

In the late afternoon, after two smaller rock slides, 10 million cubic meters (353 million cubic feet) of slate broke off, travelled 2 km (1.2 mi), and destroyed 90 hectares (220 acres) of land. The slate mine was also completely destroyed.

The event and its causes were chronicled in the same year by the local priest Ernst Buss and the geologist Albert Heim in their publication "Der Bergsturz von Elm".

== Literature ==
- A novel surrounding these events was written by Franz Hohler (2000): Die Steinflut. ISBN 978-3-42312-735-6.
