= Acobamba District, Sihuas =

Coordinates: 9°08′34″S 77°44′13″W

Acobamba Aqupampa
- District
- Interactive map of Acobamba
- Country: Peru
- Region: Ancash
- Province: Sihuas
- Founded: June 22, 1962
- Capital: Acobamba

Area
  - Total: 153.04 km^{2} (59.09 sq mi)
- Elevation: 3,140 m (10,300 ft)

Population (2005 census)
  - Total: 1,773
  - Density: 11.59/km^{2} (30.01/sq mi)
- Time zone: UTC-5 (PET)
- UBIGEO: 021902

Acobamba is a district of the Sihuas Province in the Ancash Region of northern Peru.
