= Huayllabamba District, Urubamba =

Coordinates: 13.3372°S 72.0644°W

Huayllabamba Wayllapampa
- District
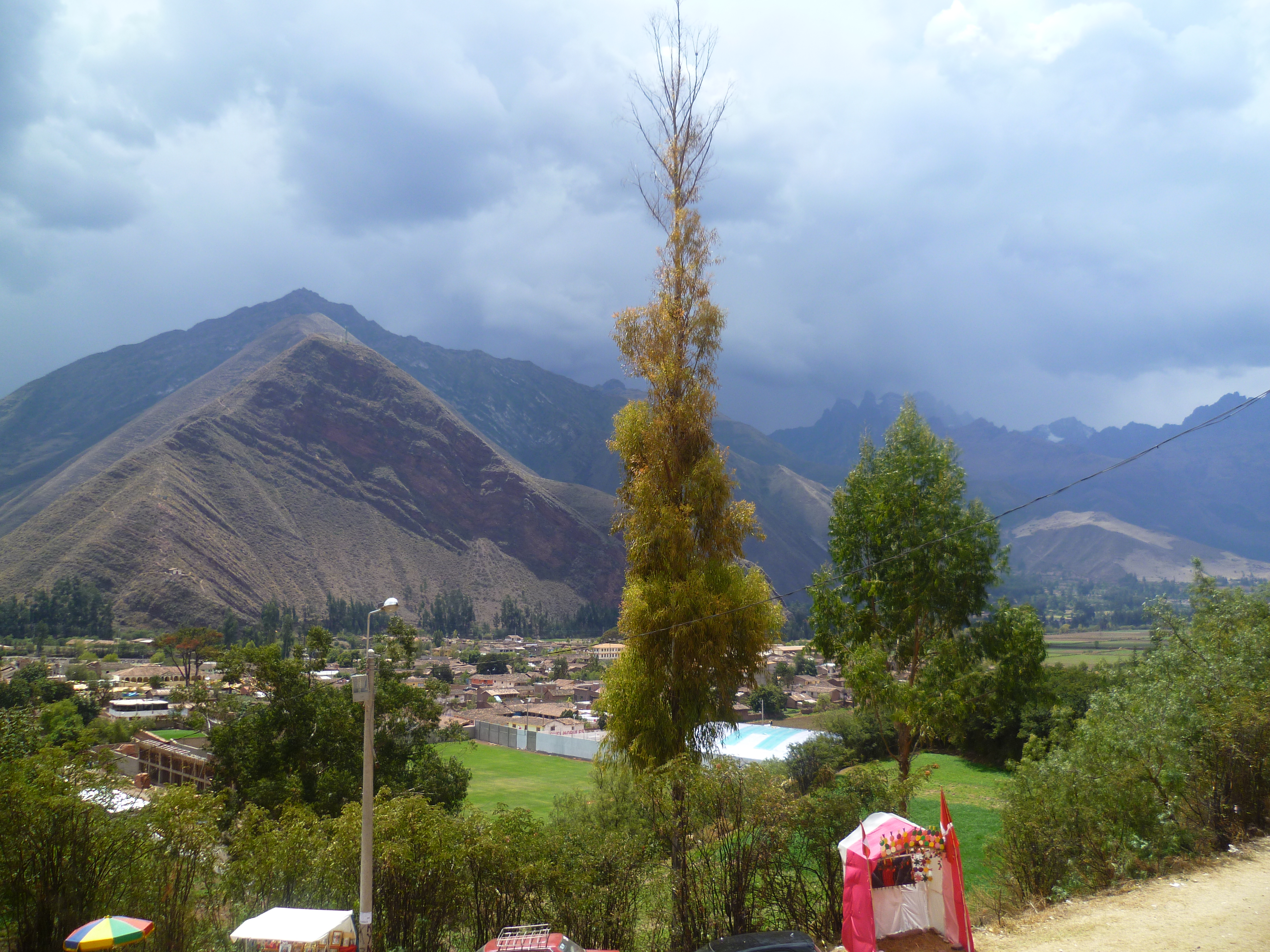
- Huayllabamba
- Interactive map of Huayllabamba
- Country: Peru
- Region: Cusco
- Province: Urubamba
- Founded: January 2, 1857
- Capital: Huayllabamba

Government
  - Mayor: Segundo Fortunato Lopez Quispe

Area
  - Total: 102.47 km^{2} (39.56 sq mi)
- Elevation: 2,866 m (9,403 ft)

Population (2025)
  - Total: 5,823
  - Density: 56.83/km^{2} (147.2/sq mi)
- Time zone: UTC-5 (PET)
- UBIGEO: 081303

Huayllabamba District is one of seven districts of the province Urubamba in Peru. The town of Huayllabamba is the capital of the district. In Quechua, "huaylla" means grassy and "bamba" means plain, e.g. "grassy plain." "Bamba" is a variation of the word "pampa."

== See also ==
- Ch'akiqucha
- Hatun Luychu
- Machu Qullqa
- Q'illuqucha
- Yanaqucha
