= Huayllabamba, Urubamba =

Huayllabamba Wayllapampa
- Village
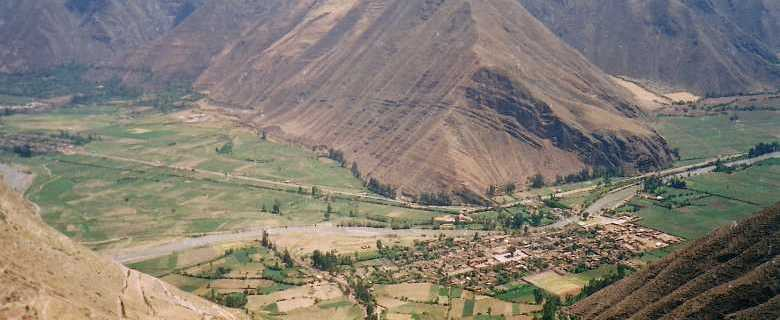
- Yukay (on the left) and Huayllabamba (on the right)

- Location within Peru
- Coordinates: 13°20′47″S 72°04′02″W
- Country: Peru
- Region: Cusco
- Province: Urubamba
- District: Huayllabamba

Government
  - Mayor: Segundo Fortunato Lopez Quispe
- Elevation: 2,866 m (9,403 ft)
- Time zone: UTC-5 (PET)

Huayllabamba is a town in Southern Peru, in the province Urubamba in the Cusco region. The town is capital of Huayllabamba District. It is located in what is known as the Sacred valley of the Incas. In Quechua, "huaylla" means grassy and "bamba" means plain, e.g. "grassy plain." "Bamba" is a variation of the word "pampa."
