= Huayllabamba District, Sihuas =

Coordinates: 8°31′59″S 77°31′59″W

Huayllabamba Waylla Pampa
- District
- Interactive map of Huayllabamba
- Country: Peru
- Region: Ancash
- Province: Sihuas
- Founded: January 26, 1956
- Capital: Huayllabamba

Area
  - Total: 287.58 km^{2} (111.04 sq mi)
- Elevation: 3,318 m (10,886 ft)

Population (2005 census)
  - Total: 4,586
  - Density: 15.95/km^{2} (41.30/sq mi)
- Time zone: UTC-5 (PET)
- UBIGEO: 021906

Huayllabamba District is one of ten districts of the Sihuas Province in the Ancash Region of northern Peru. In Quechua, "huaylla" means grassy and "bamba" means plain, e.g. "grassy plain." "Bamba" is a variation of the word "pampa."

== See also ==
- Pilanku
- Qulluta
