= Sihuas District =

Coordinates: 8°34′01″S 77°37′01″W

Sihuas
- District
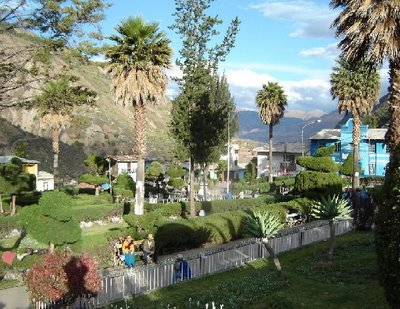
- Interactive map of Sihuas
- Country: Peru
- Region: Ancash
- Province: Sihuas
- Capital: Sihuas

Area
  - Total: 43.81 km^{2} (16.92 sq mi)
- Elevation: 2,716 m (8,911 ft)

Population (2005 census)
  - Total: 5,163
  - Density: 117.8/km^{2} (305.2/sq mi)
- Time zone: UTC-5 (PET)
- UBIGEO: 021901

Sihuas District is one of ten districts that make up the Sihuas Province in the Ancash region of Peru. It is crossed by the Rúpac river, which is a tributary of the Marañón.

This district was created prior to Peru's independence from Spain. At the time, it was part of the then department of Tarma.

The seat of government for the district is the urban center, Sihuas, which serves as the home of 72% of the district's population. The district also includes four rural centers having a population of more than 150 residents: Maraybamba Arriba, San Francisco, Saurapa, and Usamasanga. The largest of these is San Francisco, with 225 residents.

The district has an area of 43.81 km^{2}. and had a population of 5,562 as of the 2007 census.

The main economic activities (by number of workers) include agricultural pursuits (including livestock, hunting, and forestry), teaching, miscellaneous commercial businesses, construction, and manufacturing.

The literacy rate for individuals 15 and older is 89%. The district is beset by a high infant mortality rate of 53.1%.

== Climate ==
Climate data for Sihuas, elevation 2,716 m (8,911 ft), (1991–2020)
Month	Jan	Feb	Mar	Apr	May	Jun	Jul	Aug	Sep	Oct	Nov	Dec	Year
Mean daily maximum °C (°F)	24.5 (76.1)	24.3 (75.7)	23.3 (73.9)	24.3 (75.7)	24.9 (76.8)	24.8 (76.6)	25.0 (77.0)	25.3 (77.5)	25.3 (77.5)	25.1 (77.2)	25.4 (77.7)	24.2 (75.6)	24.7 (76.4)
Mean daily minimum °C (°F)	10.3 (50.5)	10.2 (50.4)	10.2 (50.4)	10.2 (50.4)	9.4 (48.9)	8.6 (47.5)	8.1 (46.6)	8.8 (47.8)	9.8 (49.6)	10.3 (50.5)	10.3 (50.5)	10.3 (50.5)	9.7 (49.5)
Average precipitation mm (inches)	126.0 (4.96)	144.0 (5.67)	195.9 (7.71)	103.9 (4.09)	33.0 (1.30)	14.9 (0.59)	9.4 (0.37)	13.9 (0.55)	44.0 (1.73)	108.2 (4.26)	107.3 (4.22)	137.5 (5.41)	1,038 (40.86)
Source: National Meteorology and Hydrology Service of Peru
