= Sihuas =

- Village
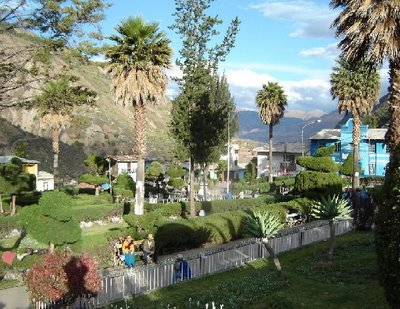
- Sihuas

- Location within Peru
- Coordinates: 8°33′28″S 77°37′33″W
- Country: Peru
- Region: Ancash Region
- Province: Sihuas Province
- District: Sihuas District

Government
  - Mayor: Jose Lopez Morillo
- Elevation: 2,730 m (8,960 ft)

Sihuas is a town in the Sihuas District of the Sihuas Province in the Ancash Region of Peru.

== Climate ==
Climate data for Sihuas, elevation 2,716 m (8,911 ft), (1991–2020)
Month	Jan	Feb	Mar	Apr	May	Jun	Jul	Aug	Sep	Oct	Nov	Dec	Year
Mean daily maximum °C (°F)	24.5 (76.1)	24.3 (75.7)	23.3 (73.9)	24.3 (75.7)	24.9 (76.8)	24.8 (76.6)	25.0 (77.0)	25.3 (77.5)	25.3 (77.5)	25.1 (77.2)	25.4 (77.7)	24.2 (75.6)	24.7 (76.4)
Mean daily minimum °C (°F)	10.3 (50.5)	10.2 (50.4)	10.2 (50.4)	10.2 (50.4)	9.4 (48.9)	8.6 (47.5)	8.1 (46.6)	8.8 (47.8)	9.8 (49.6)	10.3 (50.5)	10.3 (50.5)	10.3 (50.5)	9.7 (49.5)
Average precipitation mm (inches)	126.0 (4.96)	144.0 (5.67)	195.9 (7.71)	103.9 (4.09)	33.0 (1.30)	14.9 (0.59)	9.4 (0.37)	13.9 (0.55)	44.0 (1.73)	108.2 (4.26)	107.3 (4.22)	137.5 (5.41)	1,038 (40.86)
Source: National Meteorology and Hydrology Service of Peru
