= 1994 Mascara earthquake =

Earthquake in Algeria

- Location within Algeria
- UTC time: 1994-08-18 01:13:05
- ISC event: 160696
- USGS-ANSS: ComCat
- Local date: August 18, 1994
- Local time: 02:13 WAT
- Magnitude: 5.8 M_{w}
- Depth: 10.0 km (6.2 mi)
- Epicenter: 35.520°N 0.106°W
- Areas affected: Algeria
- Max. intensity: MSK-64 VIII (Damaging)
- Casualties: 171 dead, 654 injured

The 1994 Mascara earthquake occurred on August 18 at 02:13 local time with an epicenter in a rural part of Algeria. The earthquake measured 5.8 on the moment magnitude scale (M_{w}) and had a depth of 10 km (6.2 mi). It caused the deaths of 171 people, left up to 12,500 homeless, and destroyed thousands of homes in Mascara Province. Many homes were damaged or destroyed due to poor building quality which collapsed on the inhabitants and resulted in a majority of the casualties. The national government launched a rapid response effort in its aftermath.

== Tectonic setting ==
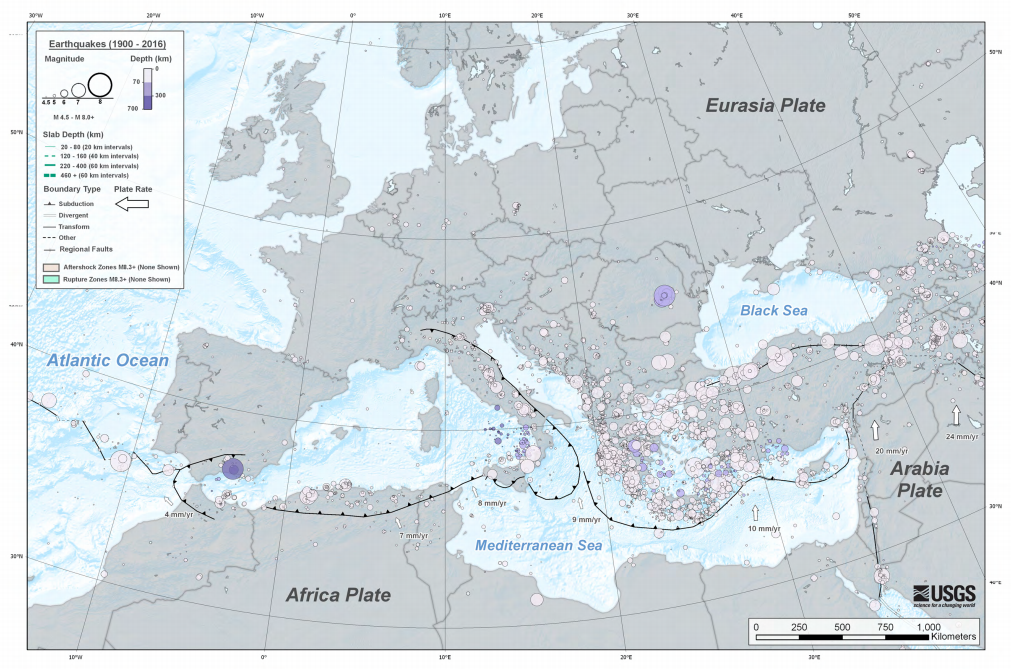
Tectonic and seismicity (1900–2016) map of the Mediterranean Sea

Northwest Africa, which also includes Algeria, is situated near a complex and poorly defined convergent plate boundary which separates the African plate from the Eurasian plate. The converging plates create a zone of compression in northern Algeria, which are accommodated by mainly thrust and strike-slip faults. Thrusting results in the formation of the Atlas Mountains. The tectonic situation of Algeria also makes the country a seismically active region, about 100 minor earthquakes are recorded on seismic instruments every month. Moderate to large earthquakes with magnitudes greater than 6.0 have resulted in human casualties and property damage. Generally, seismicity mainly occur in the Tell Atlas region, and though not as frequent, also occur off its coast. Earthquakes occurring offshore are capable of generating tsunamis, such as that in 1856. Algeria was devastated by earthquakes in 1716, 1790, 1825, 1910, 1954, 1980 and 2003. Earthquakes in the western and central area mostly display thrust mechanism caused by compression in a NNW–SSE direction. In the east, most earthquakes occur due to strike-slip faulting.

== Earthquake ==
Two fault plane solutions were obtained; either left-lateral oblique-reverse faulting on an E–W striking plane or reverse faulting on a NE–SW striking plane. The epicenter of the shock is located near the intersection of two faults; an E–W striking reverse fault that reactivated in the Quaternary as a right-lateral fault and to the west, a NE–SW striking reverse fault. The latter fault plane solution is consistent with the tectonic setting of the region because it fits the characteristics of the NE–SW striking fault. However, due to the lack of a well-established local seismic network, there are uncertainties in determining the source fault. The aftershocks were also not recorded by portable instruments to provide a detailed imaging of a fault plane. This leaves a possibility of the E–W striking fault being the source of the mainshock. No surface ruptures were observed but cliff failures and rockfalls were found during a field survey.

An aftershock sequence ensued—17 were recorded with a local magnitude (M_{L}) of 3.9 or greater. The largest aftershock measuring 5.1 M_{L} struck 30 minutes after the mainshock. These aftershocks which continued until August 28 also caused additional damage. On August 19, a 4.0 M_{L}aftershock damaged 63 homes at El Keurt, a village unaffected by the mainshock. Another aftershock on August 22 caused four injuries.

=== Damage ===
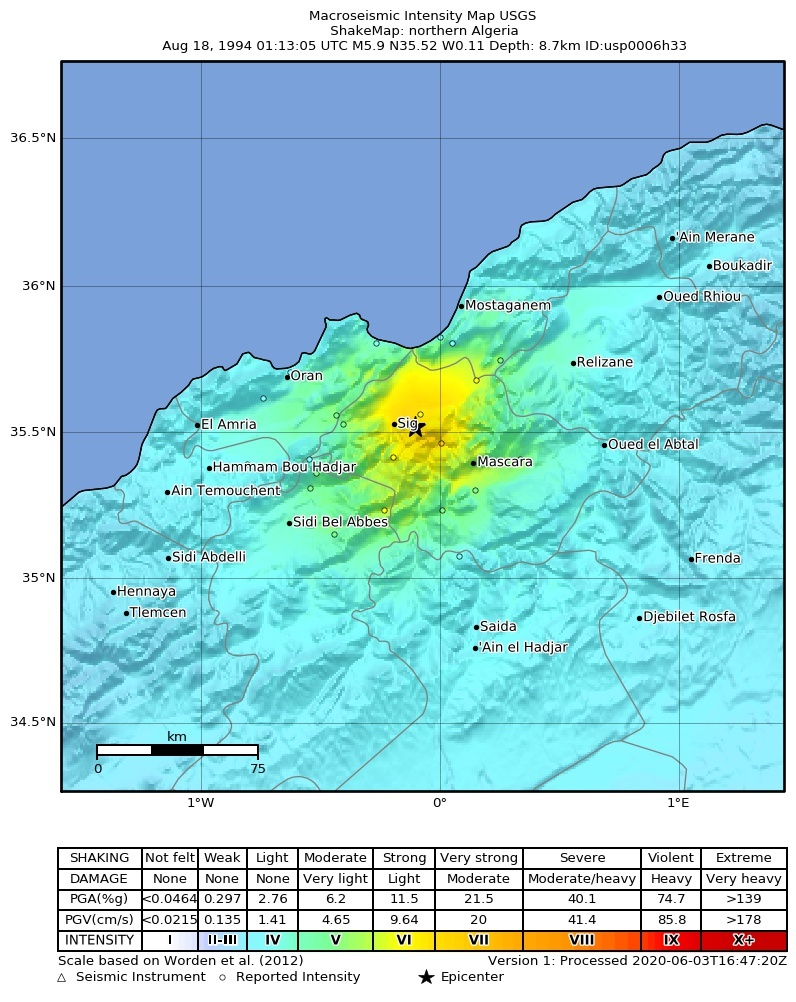
USGS ShakeMap for the earthquake

Many poorly-engineered and satisfactorily built unreinforced masonry buildings did not collapse—this insight led to the mainshock being assigned a maximum seismic intensity of VIII on the Medvedev–Sponheuer–Karnik scale. A total of 2,000 houses, farms and 10 schools were seriously damaged or collapsed. In the villages of Shadlia, Hacine and Sidi Ali Cherif, the earthquake completely destroyed all houses, a total of up to 458 houses; at least 454 homes were half-ruined, with an additional 416 ruined at 10 percent in other villages across Mascara Province. A large number of farms and their facilities were also reduced to rubble. In the city of Oran, 75 km (47 mi) NW of Hacine, some cracks appeared in buildings. The usually clear hot springs at Bou Hanifia became reddish and muddy while its flow temperature increased.

=== Casualties ===
The earthquake caused 171 fatalities and left 654 injured; 289 in critical condition; 12,500 people from over 1,300 families were made homeless. The high casualty number was attributed to poor construction practices and building materials of homes. In rural villages, many straw and mud-constructed homes collapsed, killing or injuring their inhabitants in their sleep in the early morning. The village of Shadlia alone accounted for 105 of the 171 fatalities in the earthquake. The remaining survivors have been in the streets all morning fearing that more aftershocks may collapse their already damaged dwellings.

== Aftermath ==
The Algerian Government requested international aid, to which the UN Department of Humanitarian Affairs provided US$30 thousand in emergency funds. Algerian officials urgently asked for food, dairy and blankets, and said that drinking water may be rapidly exhausted. Soldiers were sent to handle search and rescue efforts. Roads obstructed by rockfalls caused by the earthquake made relief efforts challenging and in some cases, impossible. Villages in the Beni Choughrane mountains were only accessible using military helicopters. Although the post-disaster response was rapid, it would have been more effective had the region prepared and planned for disasters prior to the earthquake. The Algerian Red Crescent established camps to accommodate survivors until prefabricated homes were ready and made an appeal for blood donation.

== See also ==
- List of earthquakes in 1994
- List of earthquakes in Algeria
