= Geology of Algeria =

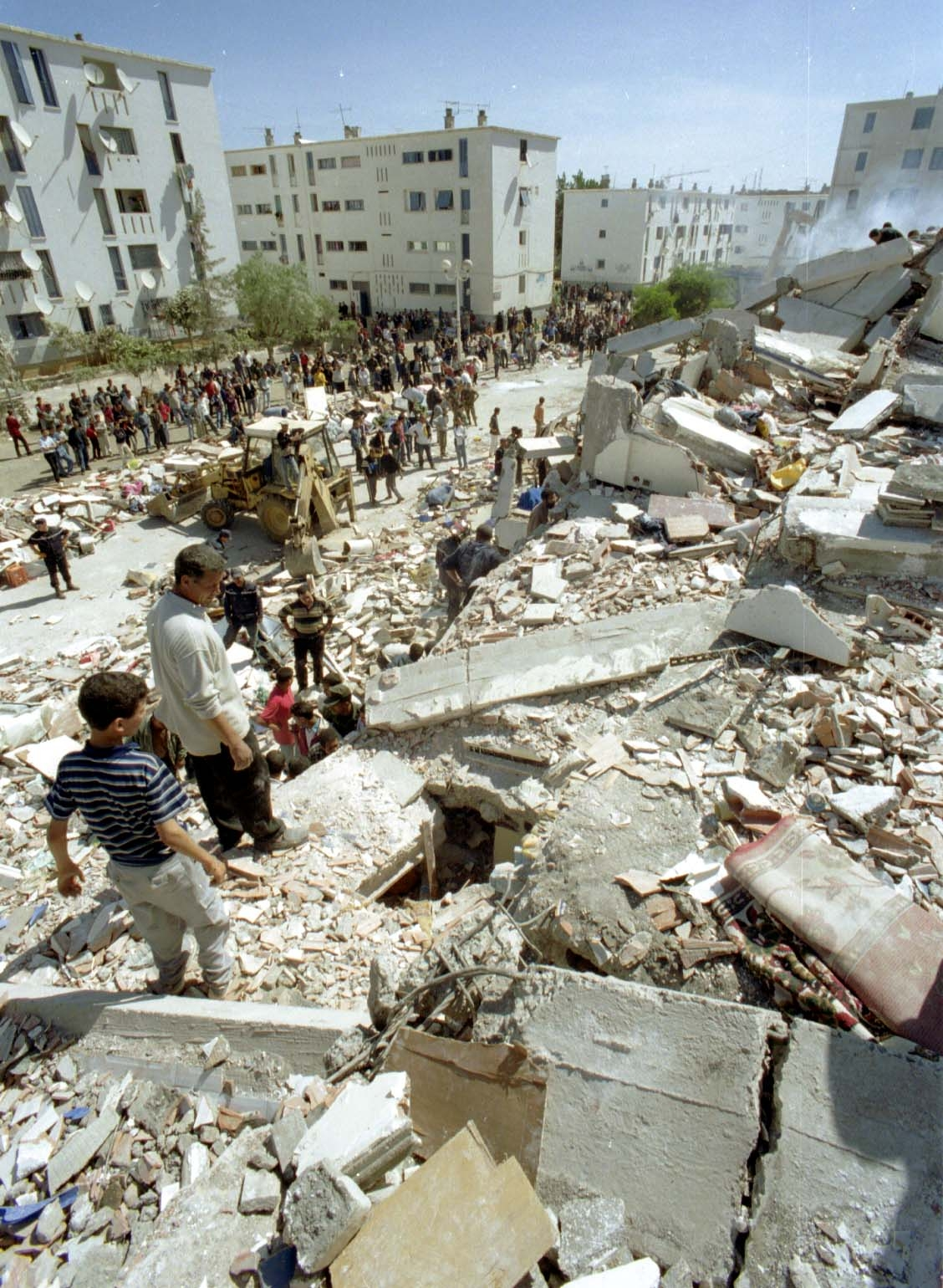
The 2003 Boumerdès earthquake

The geology of Algeria is diverse; the country divides into three different tectono-stratigraphic domains. In the south and west is the West African Craton which consists of Precambrian granitic basement and surrounding Neoproterozoic mobile belts. Further south the Tuareg Shield comprises the Hoggar, Adrar des Iforas and Air sub-shields which have each been affected by tectono-thermal events touching much of the continent. In the north are the Alpine chain mountains with a succession of folded and over-thrust strata.

== Economic geology ==
The production of oil and gas is important to Algeria's economy, being Africa's main producer of the latter. Its reserves were estimated at 4.502 trillion m^{3} at the end of 2008. Productive fields are found in anticlines, faulted anticlines or domes; the reservoirs being in Cambro-Ordovician, Triassic, Devonian, and Carboniferous sandstones. Caprocks include Triassic evaporites and Carboniferous to Devonian shales. The major source rocks for the hydrocarbons were Silurian shales rich in organic material. In 2008, Algeria was the fourth-largest oil producer in Africa accounting for about one-sixth of the continent's production. The country's proven reserves of crude petroleum are out at 1.66 billion tonnes, or about 1 percent of the global reserve.

== Geohazards ==
In Northern Algeria, earthquakes occur frequently, damaging infrastructure and property, as well as causing human loss of life. The 1980 El Asnam earthquake caused 2,600 deaths and left 300,000 homeless.

The search for hydrocarbons has also induced pollutants into aquifers and groundwater.

== See also ==
- List of earthquakes in Algeria
