= List of earthquakes in Algeria =

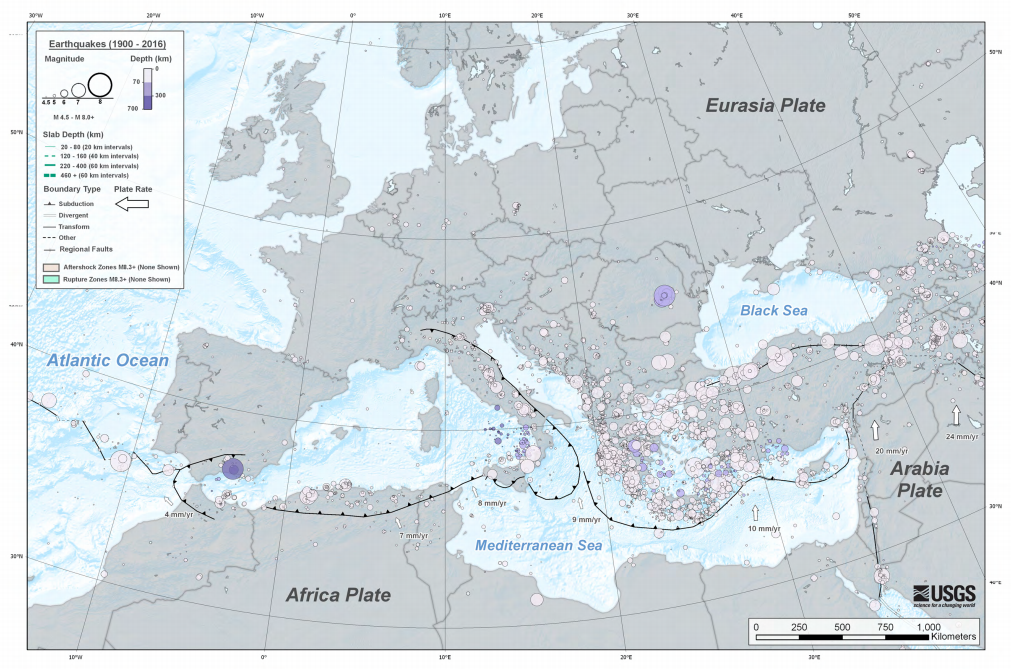
Earthquakes M 5.5+ (1900–2016) in Mediterranean Sea.

Earthquakes in Algeria occur in the north part of the country, usually north of 35° N. latitude, and occasionally as submarine earthquakes in the Mediterranean Sea. On at least one occasion, this type of event has generated a destructive tsunami.

== Earthquakes ==
Date	Region	Coords	Mag.	MMI	Deaths	Injuries	Comments
2022-06-26	Oran	35.913°N 0.363°W	4.5 mb	VII		80	Several houses damaged
2022-03-19	Béjaïa	36.856°N 5.207°E	5.2 M_{w}	VIII		30	Several homes damaged
2021-12-28	Skikda	36.738°N 6.862°E	4.3 M_{w}	III			Many buildings damaged
2021-03-18	Béjaïa	36.921°N 5.201°E	6.0 M_{w}	VII		60	2,000 buildings damaged
2020-11-22	Skikda	36.664°N 6.863°E	5.1 M_{w}	VI		Several	Buildings damaged
2020-08-07	Mila	36.550°N 6.271°E	5.0 M_{w}	VII			Severe damage
2018-01-02	Blida	36.383°N 2.547°E	4.7 M_{w}	VI		2	Some damage
2016-05-28	Bouïra	36.351°N 3.517°E	5.4 M_{w}	V		28	
2016-02-10	Blida	36.53°N 3.086°E	4.8 M_{w}	V		Several	Minor damage
2014-12-23	Blida	36.49°N 3.03°E	4.9 M_{w}	VI		Several	Severe damage
2014-08-01	Algiers	36.85°N 3.16°E	5.5 M_{w}	VII	6	420	
2013-07-17	Blida	36.534°N 3.086°E	4.8 M_{w}	VI		11	Many buildings damaged
2013-05-19	Béjaïa	36.703°N 5.261°E	5.0 M_{w}	VI		5	Some houses damaged
2010-05-14	Bouïra	35.9°N 4.12°E	5.3 M_{w}	VII	2	43	Sequence
2008-06-06	Oran	35.88°N 0.66°W	5.5 M_{w}	VI	2	30	Rockfall
2008-02-01	Boumerdès	36.83°N 3.47°E	4.6 mb	III		3	Minor damage
2008-01-09	Oran	35.62°N 0.57°W	4.6 mb	V	1		Several buildings damaged
2006-03-20	Béjaïa	36.62°N 5.33°E	5.2 M_{w}	VI	4	9	
2004-12-05	Boumerdès	36.87°N 3.42°E	4.5 M_{w}			46	
2004-12-01	Boumerdès	36.85°N 3.45°E	4.5 M_{w}			15	Aftershock / minor damage
2004-01-10	Boumerdès	36.85°N 3.42°E	4.5 M_{w}			300	Aftershock / additional damage
2003-05-27	Boumerdès	36.94°N 3.58°E	5.8 M_{w}		9	200	Tsunami
2003-05-21	Boumerdès	36.91°N 3.71°E	6.8 M_{w}	X	2,266	10,261	Tsunami
2000-11-10	Béjaïa	36.60°N 4.77°E	5.8 M_{w}	VII	2	12	Seven houses destroyed
1999-12-22	Aïn Témouchent	35.2°N 1.35°W	5.6 M_{w}	VII	22–24	175	
1994-08-18	Mascara	35.52°N 0.11°E	5.9 M_{w}		159	289	
1989-10-29		36.75°N 2.44°E	5.6 M_{s}				Additional casualties and damage
1989-10-29	Tipaza	36.77°N 2.39°E	5.9 M_{w}	VIII	22–35	184–700	
1988-10-31	Blida	36.44°N 2.76°E	5.6 M_{w}	VII		57	Severe damage
1987-01-26	Mohammadia	35.96°N 1.37°E	4.9 mb		1	7	629 homes damaged
1985-10-27	Constantine–Skikda	36.46°N 6.76°E	5.8 M_{w}		6		
1982-11-15	Tissemsilt	35.63°N 1.32°E	5.0 M_{w}	VI	6	12	Severe damage
1980-10-10	Chlef	36.2°N 1.37°E	7.1 M_{w}	X	2,633–5,000	8,369–9,000	Extreme damage / tsunami
1975-07-11		36.32°N 5.24°E	4.3 mb		1	18	Moderate damage
1968-02-25		36.08°N 5.07°W	4.9 M_{s}	VIII	1	4	Limited damage
1967-07-13		35.5°N 0.1°W	5.0 M_{s}		10	15	Limited damage
1965-01-01	M'Sila	35.7°N 4.4°E	5.5 M_{s}		4	350	Moderate damage
1960-02-21		36°N 4.1°E	5.6 M_{s}		47	88	Moderate damage
1959-11-07	Boumedfaâ	36.38°N 2.55°E	4.9 M_{s}	VIII		2	300 million Francs
1954-09-09	Chlef	36.27°N 1.59°E	6.7 M_{w}	XI	1,243–1,409	5,000	Severe damage / tsunami
1947-08-06	Annaba	37°N 8°E	5.3 M_{s}	IX	3	3	Moderate damage
1946-02-12	Hodna Mountains	35.75°N 5°E	5.6 M_{s}	IX	264		Severe damage
1924-03-16	Batna	35.10°N 5.20°E	5.6 M_{w}	IX	101		Severe damage
1910-06-24		36°N 4°E	6.4 M_{s}	XI	12		Limited damage
1891-01-15	Tipaza	36.5°N 1.8°E		X	36		Moderate damage / tsunami
1887-11-29	Kalaa	35.58°N 0.33°E		X	20		Severe damage
1885-12-03	M'Sila	36.1°N 4.6°E	5.9 M_{w}	IX	33		Severe damage
1869-11-16	Biskra	34.9°N 5.9°E		X	40		Moderate damage
1867-01-02	El Affroun	36.4°N 2.7°E		X	70	100	Moderate damage
1856-08-22		37.1°N 5.7°E		IX	3		Tsunami
1825-03-02	Blida	36.2°N 2.8°E		X	7,000		Extreme damage
1790-10-09	Oran	35.7°N 0.6°W		X	3,000		Severe damage / tsunami
May 1716	Algiers	36.8°N 3°E			20,000		Extreme damage
Note: The inclusion criteria for adding events are based on WikiProject Earthquakes' notability guideline that was developed for stand-alone articles. The principles described also apply to lists. In summary, only damaging, injurious, or deadly events should be recorded.

== See also ==
- Geology of Algeria
