= 1999 Oaxaca earthquake =

Earthquake in Mexico

- Location within Oaxaca Location within Mexico
- UTC time: 1999-09-30 16:31:15
- ISC event: 1656664
- USGS-ANSS: ComCat
- Local date: September 30, 1999
- Local time: 11:31 am
- Magnitude: 7.5 M_{w}
- Depth: 61 km (38 mi)
- Epicenter: 16.059°N 96.931°W
- Total damage: $1.472 billion Mexican pesos
- Max. intensity: MMI VIII (Severe)
- Casualties: 35-46 dead, 215 injured

The 1999 Oaxaca earthquake occurred on September 30 at 11:31 local time (16:31 UTC) in Oaxaca, Mexico, 60 km NNW of Puerto Ángel. The epicenter was located near San Agustin Loxicha. It had a magnitude of M_{w} 7.5.

== Earthquake ==
The Cocos plate subducts under Oaxaca at approximately 6.4 cm/yr. This was an intraplate earthquake in the Cocos plate, with a normal-faulting mechanism. A similar normal-faulting earthquake was observed in June of the same year. The fault plane was 90 km long and 45 km wide. The maximum slip was about 2.5 m, which was located about 20 and 40 km WNW of the hypocenter. The maximum intensity reached MM VIII in southwestern Oaxaca, and could be felt strongly in Mexico City. A total of 21 aftershocks of M_{w}4.0-4.7 were reported.

== Impact ==
The torrential rains and flooding preceding and following the temblor intensified the damage of this earthquake. Thirty-five people were reported dead, although another source states forty-six deaths with 215 injuries. Nearly 1.5 billion pesos of damage was accounted for, and over 45,000 homes were destroyed or damaged. The archeological site of the ancient Zapotec city of Monte Alban also suffered damage in this earthquake.

== See also ==
- List of earthquakes in 1999
- List of earthquakes in Mexico
- 1999 Tehuacán earthquake
