= List of earthquakes in 1999 =

Earthquakes in 1999
Approximate epicenters of notable earthquakes in 1999
- 4.0–5.9 magnitude
- 6.0–6.9 magnitude
- 7.0–7.9 magnitude
- 8.0+ magnitude
- Strongest: 7.7 M_{w}, Taiwan
- Deadliest: 7.6 M_{w}, (Turkey) Turkey; 18,373 deaths
- Total fatalities: 23,848

Number by magnitude
- 9.0+: 0
- 8.0–8.9: 0
- 7.0–7.9: 18
- 6.0–6.9: 118
- 5.0–5.9: 1055

This is a list of earthquakes in 1999. Only earthquakes of magnitude 6 or above are included, unless they result in damage and/or casualties, or are notable for some other reason. All dates are listed according to UTC (Coordinated Universal Time) time.

== Compared to other years ==
Number of earthquakes worldwide for 1999–2009 []
Magnitude	1999	2000	2001	2002	2003	2004	2005	2006	2007	2008	2009
8.0–9.9	0	1	1	0	1	2	1	2	4	1	1
7.0–7.9	18	15	14	13	14	14	10	9	14	12	16
6.0–6.9	117	145	122	126	139	141	139	142	178	167	143
5.0–5.9	1,057	1,334	1,212	1,170	1,212	1,511	1,694	1,726	2,090	1,786	1,912
4.0–4.9	7,004	7,968	7,969	8,479	8,455	10,880	13,893	12,843	12,081	12,294	6,817
Total	8,296	9,462	9,319	9,788	9,823	12,551	15,738	14,723	14,367	14,261	8,891

== Overall ==
=== By death toll ===
Rank	Death toll	Magnitude	Location	MMI	Depth (km)	Date
1	18,373	7.6	Turkey, Kocaeli	X (Extreme)	17.0	August 17
2	2,415	7.7	Taiwan, Nantou	X (Extreme)	33.0	September 20
3	1,900	6.2	Colombia, Quindío	X (Extreme)	17.0	January 25
4	845	7.2	Turkey, Düzce	IX (Violent)	10.0	November 12
5	143	6.0	Greece, Athens	IX (Violent)	10.0	September 7
6	103	6.6	India, Chamoli	VIII (Severe)	15.0	March 28
7	70	6.0	Afghanistan, Kabul	VI (Strong)	33.0	February 11
8	35	7.5	Mexico, Oaxaca	VIII (Severe)	60.6	September 30
9	22	5.6	Algeria, Aïn Témouchent	VII (Very strong)	10.0	December 22
10	14	7.0	Mexico, Puebla	VIII (Severe)	70.0	June 15
11	10	7.5	Vanuatu, Ambrym	VII (Very strong)	33.0	November 26

- Note: At least 10 dead

=== By magnitude ===
Rank	Magnitude	Death toll	Location	MMI	Depth (km)	Date
1	7.7	2,415	Taiwan, Nantou	X (Extreme)	33.0	September 20
2	7.6	18,373	Turkey, Kocaeli	X (Extreme)	17.0	August 17
3	7.5	35	Mexico, Oaxaca	VIII (Severe)	60.6	September 30
3	7.5	10	Vanuatu	VII (Very strong)	33.0	November 26
5	7.4	0	Papua New Guinea, New Britain	VII (Very strong)	150.0	April 5
6	7.3	0	Solomon Islands	VII (Very strong)	90.1	February 6
6	7.3	6	Philippines, Luzon	VIII (Severe)	33.0	December 11
8	7.2	845	Turkey, Düzce	IX (Violent)	10.0	November 12
9	7.1	0	Philippines, Mindanao	VIII (Severe)	33.0	March 4
9	7.1	0	China, Heilongjiang	III (Weak)	565.7	April 8
9	7.1	0	Papua New Guinea, New Britain	VII (Very strong)	138.0	May 10
9	7.1	0	Papua New Guinea, New Britain	VII (Very strong)	73.7	May 16
9	7.1	0	United States, California	VII (Very strong)	13.7	October 16
14	7.0	0	Papua New Guinea, New Britain	VII (Very strong)	114.1	January 19
14	7.0	14	Mexico, Puebla	VIII (Severe)	70.0	June 15
14	7.0	0	South Indian Ocean	VI (Strong)	10.0	November 15
14	7.0	0	Papua New Guinea, New Britain	VI (Strong)	33.0	November 19
14	7.0	0	United States, Alaska	VII (Very strong)	66.0	December 6

- Note: At least 7.0 magnitude

== By month ==
=== January ===
January
- Strongest: 7.0 M_{w}, Papua New Guinea
- Deadliest: 6.2 M_{w}, Colombia; 1,185 deaths
- Total fatalities: 1,185

Number by magnitude
- 8.0–8.9: 0
- 7.0–7.9: 1
- 6.0–6.9: 9
- 5.0–5.9: 86

Date	Country and location	M_{w}	Depth (km)	MMI	Notes	Casualties	
Date	Country and location	M_{w}	Depth (km)	MMI	Notes	Dead	Injured
2	China, Yunnan, 93 km (58 mi) ENE of Lijiang	4.5	41.4	III	Two people were injured and some animals died in Ninglang County.	-	2
5	Tonga, Vava'u, 18 km (11 mi) NO of Neiafu	6.0	33.0	V	-	-	-
12	Papua New Guinea, East New Britain Province, 135 km (84 mi) SSO of Kokopo	6.0	42.6	V	-	-	-
16	USA, Gulf of Alaska	6.0	21.0	I	-	-	-
19	Papua New Guinea, East New Britain Province, 110 km (68 mi) ESE of Kokopo	7.0	114.1	VII	-	-	-
24	Japan, Kagoshima Prefecture, 15 km (9.3 mi) SSE of Nishinoomote	6.4	33.0	VI	-	-	-
24	Tonga, 'Eua, 37 km (23 mi) NE of 'Ohonua	6.1	33.0	I	-	-	-
24	Central Indian Ridge	6.3	10.0	I	-	-	-
25	Colombia, Quindío Department, 40 km (25 mi) west-southwest of Armenia	6.2	17.0	X	Further information: 1999 Colombia earthquake	1,900	4,000
28	USA, Alaska, 18 km (11 mi) OSO of Nikolski	6.6	67.2	VI	Minor damage occurred in the epicenter area.	-	-
28	Papua New Guinea, East New Britain Province, 156 km (97 mi) east of Kokopo	6.4	101.0	V	-	-	-

=== February ===
February
- Strongest: 7.3 M_{w}, Solomon Islands
- Deadliest: 6.0 M_{w} Afghanistan; 70 deaths
- Total fatalities: 70

Number by magnitude
- 8.0–8.9: 0
- 7.0–7.9: 1
- 6.0–6.9: 7
- 5.0–5.9: 85

Date	Country and location	M_{w}	Depth (km)	MMI	Notes	Casualties	
Date	Country and location	M_{w}	Depth (km)	MMI	Notes	Dead	Injured
3	Tonga, Ha'apai, 54 km (34 mi) south of Pangai	6.3	33.0	I	-	-	-
6	Philippines, Cagayan, 66 km (41 mi) north of Namuac	6.0	33.0	V	-	-	-
6	Solomon Islands, Torba Province, 146 km (91 mi) northwest of Sola, Vanuatu	7.3	90.1	VII	-	-	-
11	Afghanistan, Logar Province, 27 km (17 mi) northwest of Azra	6.0	33.0	VI	Further information: 1999 Afghanistan earthquake	70	500
13	Papua New Guinea, East Sepik Province, 101 km (63 mi) ENE of Angoram	6.2	10.0	VI	-	-	-
14	Vanuatu, Malampa Province, 89 km (55 mi) NE of Norsup	6.0	10.0	VI	-	-	-
22	New Caledonia, Loyalty Islands Province, 187 km (116 mi) east of Maré Island	6.4	33.0	I	-	-	-
23	Indonesia, Central Sulawesi, 127 km (79 mi) NO of Palu	6.2	33.0	V	-	-	-

=== March ===
March
- Strongest: 7.1 M_{w}, Philippines
- Deadliest: 6.6 M_{w}, (India) India; 103 deaths
- Total fatalities: 103

Number by magnitude
- 8.0–8.9: 0
- 7.0–7.9: 1
- 6.0–6.9: 7
- 5.0–5.9: 91

Date	Country and location	M_{w}	Depth (km)	MMI	Notes	Casualties	
Date	Country and location	M_{w}	Depth (km)	MMI	Notes	Dead	Injured
4	Iran, Hormozgan province, 110 km (68 mi) SSE of Bandar Abbas	6.6	33.0	VII	One person died in Kerman.	1	-
4	Philippines, Zamboanga, 69 km (43 mi) south of Jolo	7.1	33.0	VI	-	-	-
5	Argentina, Mendoza Province, 110 km (68 mi) ESE of Machalí, Chile	6.0	10.0	VII	-	-	-
7	Fiji, Macuata Province, 139 km (86 mi) ENE of Labasa	6.1	33.0	-	-	-	-
8	Russia, Kamchatka Krai, 123 km (76 mi) SE of Vilyuchinsk	6.9	56.6	V	-	-	-
20	USA, Alaska, 78 km (48 mi) WSW of Adak	6.9	33.0	VI	-	-	-
28	India, Uttarakhand, 9 km (5.6 mi) NNW of Chamoli	6.6	15.0	VIII	Further information: 1999 Chamoli earthquake	103	394
31	Panama, Chiriquí, 245 km (152 mi) S of Punta de Burica	6.3	10.0	-	-	-	-

=== April ===
April
- Strongest: 7.4 M_{w}, Papua New Guinea
- Deadliest: 6.8 M_{w} Peru; 1 death
- Total fatalities: 1

Number by magnitude
- 8.0–8.9: 0
- 7.0–7.9: 2
- 6.0–6.9: 10
- 5.0–5.9: 67

Date	Country and location	M_{w}	Depth (km)	MMI	Notes	Casualties	
Date	Country and location	M_{w}	Depth (km)	MMI	Notes	Dead	Injured
1	Papua New Guinea, East New Britain, 48 km (30 mi) east of Kokopo	6.2	33.0	VI	-	-	-
2	Vanuatu, Tafea, 120 km (75 mi) WSW of Isangel	6.2	10.0	-	-	-	-
3	Peru, Arequipa, 6 km (3.7 mi) SE of Camaná	6.8	87.2	VII	One person died and several buildings were damaged in Camaná	1	-
3	Honduras, Valle, 13 km (8.1 mi) south of Amapala	6.0	38.4	VIII	Five people were injured and 20 houses were damaged in La Unión.	-	5
5	Papua New Guinea, East New Britain, 63 km (39 mi) west of Kimbe	7.4	150.0	VII	-	-	-
20	Papua New Guinea, Morobe, 21 km (13 mi) north of Lae	6.4	33.0	VI	Aftershock of the M7.4 earthquake that occurred hours later.	-	-
8	China, Jilin, 57 km (35 mi) ENE of Wangqing	7.1	565.7	III	-	-	-
9	Fiji, South of the islands	6.2	621.2	-	-	-	-
11	Papua New Guinea, Morobe, 94 km (58 mi) NE of Finschhafen	6.0	58.3	V	Aftershock of the 7.4 earthquake that occurred on April 5.	-	-
13	Tonga, Tongatapu, 132 km (82 mi) WSW of Nuku'alofa	6.8	164.2	-	-	-	-
20	New Zealand, Kermadec Islands Region	6.5	95.7	-	-	-	-
26	Ecuador, Morona Santiago, 21 km (13 mi) ENE of Palora	6.0	172.6	-	-	-	-

=== May ===
May
- Strongest: 7.1 M_{w}, Papua New Guinea; 7.1 M_{w}, Papua New Guinea
- Deadliest: 6.2 M_{w} Iran; 26 death
- Total fatalities: 26

Number by magnitude
- 8.0–8.9: 0
- 7.0–7.9: 2
- 6.0–6.9: 10
- 5.0–5.9: 88

Date	Country and location	M_{w}	Depth (km)	MMI	Notes	Casualties	
Date	Country and location	M_{w}	Depth (km)	MMI	Notes	Dead	Injured
5	Mexico, Chiapas, 197 km (122 mi) SO of Manuel Ávila Camacho	6.1	33.0	-	-	-	-
6	Iran, Fars, 25 km (16 mi) ESE of Kazerun	6.2	33.0	VI	At least 26 people died and several were injured.	26	Several
7	USA, Alaska, 129 km (80 mi) SSE of Old Harbor	6.2	10.0	-	-	-	-
8	Guatemala, Retalhuleu, 9 km (5.6 mi) SSW of Champerico	6.1	39.2	VI	-	-	-
10	Papua New Guinea, West New Britain Province, 92 km (57 mi) ENE of Kimbe	7.1	138,0	VII	-	-	-
11	East Pacific Rise offshore	6.0	10.0	-	-	-	-
12	Japan, Hokkaidō, 44 km (27 mi) W of Kushiro	6.2	102.7	V	-	-	-
16	Papua New Guinea, East New Britain Province, 51 km (32 mi) SSE of Kokopo	7.1	73.7	VII	-	-	-
16	Indonesia, Papua, 268 km (167 mi) W of Jayapura	6.4	59.2	VI	-	-	-
17	Papua New Guinea, East New Britain Province, 113 km (70 mi) SE of Kokopo	6.6	27.0	V	Minor damage in the epicenter area.	-	-
18	Papua New Guinea, Morobe, 125 km (78 mi) NE of Finschhafen	6.1	127.3	IV	-	-	-
22	Vanuatu, Tafea, 145 km (90 mi) SSE of Isangel	6.1	33.0	-	-	-	-

=== June ===
June
- Strongest: 7.0 M_{w}, Mexico
- Deadliest: 7.0 M_{w} Mexico; 14 death
- Total fatalities: 14

Number by magnitude
- 8.0–8.9: 0
- 7.0–7.9: 1
- 6.0–6.9: 4
- 5.0–5.9: 74

Date	Country and location	M_{w}	Depth (km)	MMI	Notes	Casualties	
Date	Country and location	M_{w}	Depth (km)	MMI	Notes	Dead	Injured
6	Guatemala, Escuintla, 6 km (3.7 mi) ESE of Puerto San José	6.3	33.0	VI	-	-	-
5	Mexico, Puebla, 1 km (0.62 mi) SE of Texcala	7.0	70.0	VII	Further information: 1999 Tehuacán earthquake	14	200

- The Philippines was struck by a magnitude 6.4 quake that occurred on June 18 at a depth of 33.0 km (20.5 mi).
- Mexico was struck by a magnitude 6.3 quake that occurred on June 21 at a depth of 68.7 km (42.7 mi).
- Fiji was struck by a magnitude 6.0 quake that occurred on June 26 at a depth of 590.4 km (366.9 mi).

=== July ===
July
- Strongest: 6.7 M_{w}, Guatemala
- Deadliest: 6.7 M_{w}, (Guatemala) Guatemala; 2 deaths
- Total fatalities: >= 2

Number by magnitude
- 8.0–8.9: 0
- 7.0–7.9: 0
- 6.0–6.9: 10
- 5.0–5.9: 74

- (Canada) Vancouver Island was struck by a magnitude 6.2 quake that occurred on July 2 at a depth of 10.0 km (6.2 mi).
- (Japan) The Bonin Islands were struck by a magnitude 6.1 quake that occurred on July 3 at a depth of 430.6 km (267.6 mi).
- (Russia) The Kuril Islands were struck by a magnitude 6.1 quake that occurred on July 7 at a depth of 33.0 km (20.5 mi).
- Papua New Guinea was struck by a magnitude 6.3 quake that occurred on July 9 at a depth of 29.0 km (18.0 mi).
- Guatemala was struck by a magnitude 6.7 quake that occurred on July 11 at a depth of 10.0 km (6.2 mi). At least two people were killed and 40 others were injured.
- Fiji was struck by a magnitude 6.0 quake that occurred on July 18 at a depth of 590.9 km (367.2 mi).
- (New Zealand) The Kermadec Islands were struck by a magnitude 6.5 quake that occurred on July 19 at a depth of 39.0 km (24.2 mi).
- Papua New Guinea was struck by a magnitude 6.2 quake that occurred on July 26 at a depth of 69.4 km (43.1 mi).
- (New Zealand) The Kermadec Islands were struck by a magnitude 6.1 quake that occurred on July 28 at a depth of 33.0 km (20.5 mi).
- (New Zealand) The Kermadec Islands were struck by a magnitude 6.3 quake that occurred on July 28 at a depth of 25.0 km (15.5 mi).

=== August ===
August
- Strongest: 7.6 M_{w}, Turkey
- Deadliest: 7.6 M_{w}, (Turkey) Turkey; 17,127-18,373 deaths
- Total fatalities: >= 17,127

Number by magnitude
- 8.0–8.9: 0
- 7.0–7.9: 1
- 6.0–6.9: 10
- 5.0–5.9: 89

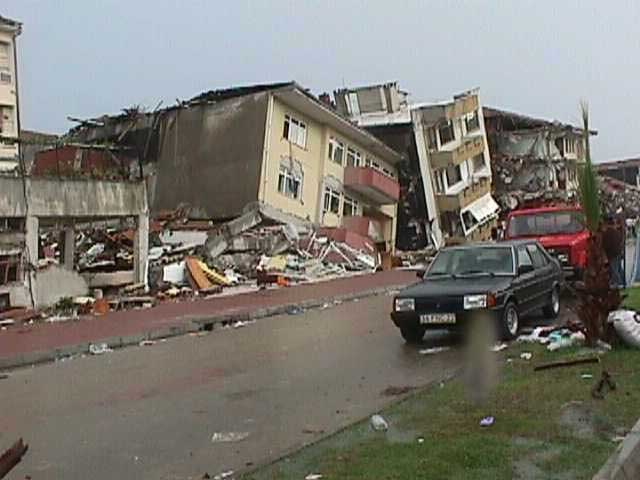
Collapsed buildings in İzmit in Turkey.

- (New Zealand) The Kermadec Islands were struck by a magnitude 6.5 quake that occurred on August 1 at a depth of 10.0 km (6.2 mi).
- (Indonesia) Sulawesi was struck by a magnitude 6.2 quake that occurred on August 12 at a depth of 33.0 km (20.5 mi).
- (Indonesia) Sumatra was struck by a magnitude 6.4 quake that occurred on August 14 at a depth of 101.4 km (63.0 mi).
- Turkey was struck by a magnitude 7.6 quake that occurred on August 17 at a depth of 17.0 km (10.6 mi). At least 17,127 people were killed and up to 50,000 others were injured; damage totalled to $6.5 billion.
- Costa Rica was struck by a magnitude 6.9 quake that occurred on August 20 at a depth of 20.0 km (12.4 mi).
- (South Georgia and the South Sandwich Islands) The South Sandwich Islands were struck by a magnitude 6.2 quake that occurred on August 21 at a depth of 10.0 km (6.2 mi).
- Chile was struck by a magnitude 6.4 quake that occurred on August 22 at a depth of 33.0 km (20.5 mi).
- Vanuatu was struck by a magnitude 6.6 quake that occurred on August 22 at a depth of 33.0 km (20.5 mi).
- Papua New Guinea was struck by a magnitude 6.2 quake that occurred on August 26 at a depth of 33.0 km (20.5 mi).
- Ecuador was struck by a magnitude 6.3 quake that occurred on August 28 at a depth of 196.4 km (122.0 mi).
- The Carlsberg Ridge was struck by a magnitude 6.0 quake that occurred on August 29 at a depth of 10.0 km (6.2 mi).

=== September ===
September
- Strongest: 7.7 M_{w}, Taiwan
- Deadliest: 7.7 M_{w}, (Taiwan) Taiwan; 2,415 deaths
- Total fatalities: >= 2,593

Number by magnitude
- 8.0–8.9: 0
- 7.0–7.9: 2
- 6.0–6.9: 15
- 5.0–5.9: 89

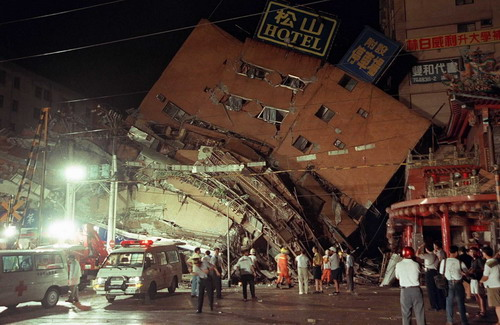
Tunghsing Building, in Taipei City, after the quake in Taiwan.

- Greece was struck by a magnitude 6.0 quake that occurred on September 7 at a depth of 10.0 km (6.2 mi). At least 143 people were killed, 2,000 were injured, 50,000 were homeless and 53,000+ buildings were damaged or destroyed.
- (New Zealand) The Kermadec Islands were struck by a magnitude 6.0 quake that occurred on September 10 at a depth of 33.0 km (20.5 mi).
- Bolivia was struck by a magnitude 6.4 quake that occurred on September 15 at a depth of 218.0 km (135.5 mi).
- Vanuatu was struck by a magnitude 6.3 quake that occurred on September 17 at a depth of 196.8 km (122.3 mi).
- (Russia) The Kamchatka Peninsula was struck by a magnitude 6.0 quake that occurred on September 18 at a depth of 60.0 km (37.3 mi).
- Taiwan was struck by a magnitude 7.7 quake that occurred on September 21 at a depth of 33.0 km (20.5 mi). 2,415 people were killed, 29 were missing, 11,305 were injured and 105,479 buildings were damaged or destroyed.
- Taiwan was struck by a magnitude 6.3 quake that occurred on September 21 at a depth of 25.0 km (15.5 mi).
- Taiwan was struck by a magnitude 6.1 quake that occurred on September 21 at a depth of 33.0 km (20.5 mi).
- Taiwan was struck by a magnitude 6.3 quake that occurred on September 21 at a depth of 33.0 km (20.5 mi).
- Taiwan was struck by a magnitude 6.1 quake that occurred on September 21 at a depth of 33.0 km (20.5 mi).
- Taiwan was struck by a magnitude 6.2 quake that occurred on September 21 at a depth of 33.0 km (20.5 mi).
- Taiwan was struck by a magnitude 6.4 quake that occurred on September 21 at a depth of 33.0 km (20.5 mi).
- Taiwan was struck by a magnitude 6.4 quake that occurred on September 22 at a depth of 26.0 km (16.2 mi).
- Taiwan was struck by a magnitude 6.5 quake that occurred on September 25 at a depth of 17.0 km (10.6 mi).
- Russia was struck by a magnitude 6.1 quake that occurred on September 28 at a depth of 33.0 km (20.5 mi).
- Chile was struck by a magnitude 6.0 quake that occurred on September 29 at a depth of 33.0 km (20.5 mi).
- Mexico was struck by a magnitude 7.5 quake that occurred on September 30 at a depth of 60.6 km (37.7 mi). 35 people were killed.

=== October ===
October
- Strongest: 7.1 M_{w}, California

Number by magnitude
- 8.0–8.9: 0
- 7.0–7.9: 1
- 6.0–6.9: 6
- 5.0–5.9: 84

- Indonesia was struck by a magnitude 6.1 quake that occurred on October 10 at a depth of 33.0 km (20.5 mi).
- Alaska was struck by a magnitude 6.4 quake that occurred on October 13 at a depth of 30.0 km (18.6 mi).
- California was struck by a magnitude 7.1 quake that occurred on October 16 at a depth of 13.7 km (8.5 mi).
- (South Georgia and the South Sandwich Islands) The South Sandwich Islands were struck by a magnitude 6.3 quake that occurred on October 18 at a depth of 33.0 km (20.5 mi).
- Papua New Guinea was struck by a magnitude 6.3 quake that occurred on October 23 at a depth of 83.3 km (51.8 mi).
- (Russia) The Kuril Islands were struck by a magnitude 6.0 quake that occurred on October 24 at a depth of 33.0 km (20.5 mi).
- (New Zealand) The North Island was struck by a magnitude 6.2 quake that occurred on October 25 at a depth of 158.7 km (98.6 mi).

=== November ===
November
- Strongest: 7.5 M_{w}, Vanuatu
- Deadliest: 7.2 M_{w}, (Turkey) Turkey; 845-894 deaths
- Total fatalities: >= 850

Number by magnitude
- 8.0–8.9: 0
- 7.0–7.9: 4
- 6.0–6.9: 14
- 5.0–5.9: 105

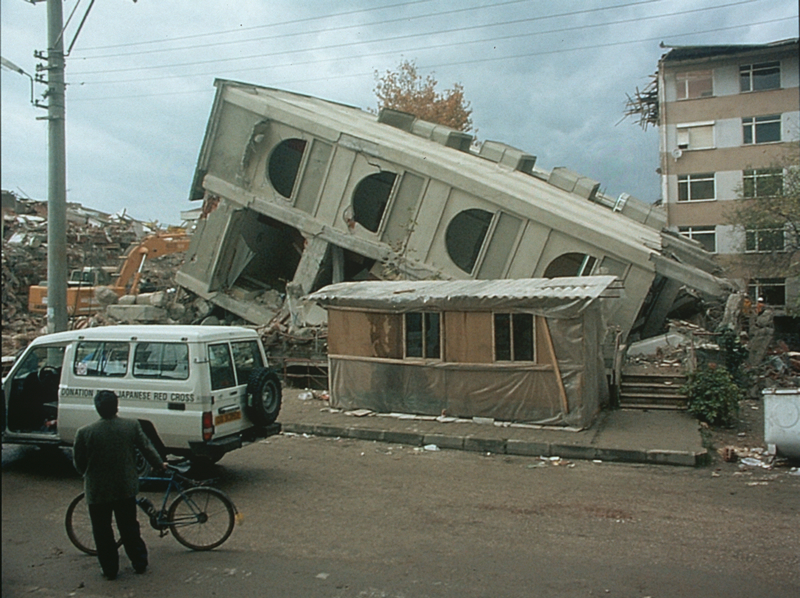
Collapsed building in Düzce in Turkey.

- Taiwan was struck by a magnitude 6.3 quake that occurred on November 1 at a depth of 33.0 km (20.5 mi).
- (Afghanistan) The Hindu Kush region was struck by a magnitude 6.5 quake that occurred on November 8 at a depth of 228.4 km (141.9 mi).
- (Russia) The Kuril Islands were struck by a magnitude 6.1 quake that occurred on November 11 at a depth of 33.0 km (20.5 mi).
- (Indonesia) Sumatra was struck by a magnitude 6.2 quake that occurred on November 11 at a depth of 211.0 km (131.1 mi).
- Turkey was struck by a magnitude 7.2 quake that occurred on November 12 at a depth of 10.0 km (6.2 mi). At least 845-894 people were killed, 4,948 were injured and 55,000 were displaced.
- The south Indian Ocean was struck by a magnitude 7.0 quake that occurred on November 15 at a depth of 10.0 km (6.2 mi).
- The East Pacific Rise was struck by a magnitude 6.1 quake that occurred on November 16 at a depth of 10.0 km (6.2 mi).
- Papua New Guinea was struck by a magnitude 6.9 quake that occurred on November 17 at a depth of 47.5 km (29.5 mi).
- Papua New Guinea was struck by a magnitude 6.3 quake that occurred on November 17 at a depth of 45.3 km (28.1 mi).
- (Indonesia) The Molucca Sea was struck by a magnitude 6.0 quake that occurred on November 18 at a depth of 33.0 km (20.5 mi).
- Papua New Guinea was struck by a magnitude 7.0 quake that occurred on November 19 at a depth of 33.0 km (20.5 mi).
- Mexico was struck by a magnitude 6.2 quake that occurred on November 21 at a depth of 33.0 km (20.5 mi).
- Russia was struck by a magnitude 6.0 quake that occurred on November 26 at a depth of 33.0 km (20.5 mi).
- Vanuatu was struck by a magnitude 7.5 quake that occurred on November 26 at a depth of 33.0 km (20.5 mi). At least 5-10 people died and 40-100 were injured.
- The south Indian Ocean was struck by a magnitude 6.4 quake that occurred on November 29 at a depth of 10.0 km (6.2 mi).
- Chile was struck by a magnitude 6.6 quake that occurred on November 30 at a depth of 128.1 km (79.6 mi).

=== December ===
December
- Strongest: 7.3 M_{w}, Philippines
- Deadliest: 5.6 M_{w}, (Algeria) Algeria; 22-24 deaths
- Total fatalities: >= 30

Number by magnitude
- 8.0–8.9: 0
- 7.0–7.9: 2
- 6.0–6.9: 18
- 5.0–5.9: 123

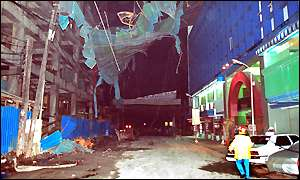
Damaged building as a result of the Luzon Earthquake in Philippines.

- The Cayman Islands were struck by a magnitude 6.3 quake that occurred on December 1 at a depth of 10.0 km (6.2 mi).
- (Alaska) The Kodiak Islands were struck by a magnitude 7.0 quake that occurred on December 6 at a depth of 66.0 km (41.0 mi).
- (Alaska) The Kodiak Islands were struck by a magnitude 6.4 quake that occurred on December 7 at a depth of 40.9 km (25.4 mi).
- Tonga was struck by a magnitude 6.4 quake that occurred on December 7 at a depth of 137.7 km (85.6 mi).
- The Solomon Islands were struck by a magnitude 6.1 quake that occurred on December 8 at a depth of 33.0 km (20.5 mi).
- Papua New Guinea was struck by a magnitude 6.4 quake that occurred on December 9 at a depth of 58.3 km (36.2 mi).
- The west Chile Rise was struck by a magnitude 6.5 quake that occurred on December 10 at a depth of 10.0 km (6.2 mi).
- The Philippines was struck by a magnitude 7.3 quake that occurred on December 11 at a depth of 33.0 km (20.5 mi). 6 people died and 40 were injured. Power outages also occurred in Manila.
- Papua New Guinea was struck by a magnitude 6.3 quake that occurred on December 15 at a depth of 33.0 km (20.5 mi).
- The Philippines were struck by a magnitude 4.8 quake that occurred on December 15 at a depth of 33.0 km (20.5 mi). One person died in Tacloban and minor damage was caused.
- The western Indian Antarctic Ridge was struck by a magnitude 6.0 quake that occurred on December 16 at a depth of 10.0 km (6.2 mi).
- The western Indian-Antarctic Ridge was struck by a magnitude 6.0 quake that occurred on December 17 at a depth of 10.0 km (6.2 mi).
- Indonesia was struck by a magnitude 6.2 quake that occurred on December 18 at a depth of 16.2 km (10.1 mi).
- Guam was struck by a magnitude 6.0 quake that occurred on December 19 at a depth of 50.9 km (31.6 mi).
- (Indonesia) The Sunda Strait was struck by a magnitude 6.5 quake that occurred on December 21 at a depth of 56.0 km (34.8 mi). At least five people were killed and more than 200 were injured.
- (Solomon Islands) The Santa Cruz Islands were struck by a magnitude 6.0 quake that occurred on December 22 at a depth of 33.0 km (20.5 mi).
- Algeria was struck by a magnitude 5.6 quake that occurred on December 22 at a depth of 10.0 km (6.2 mi). At least 22-24 people were killed, 175 were injured and 15,000 were displaced.
- Macquarie Island was struck by a magnitude 6.3 quake that occurred on December 24 at a depth of 10.0 km (6.2 mi).
- Macquarie Island was struck by a magnitude 6.1 quake that occurred on December 24 at a depth of 10.0 km (6.2 mi).
- Panama was struck by a magnitude 6.2 quake that occurred on December 28 at a depth of 10.0 km (6.2 mi).
- (Solomon Islands) The Santa Cruz Islands were struck by a magnitude 6.9 quake that occurred on December 29 at a depth of 33.0 km (20.5 mi).
- (Solomon Islands) The Santa Cruz Islands were struck by a magnitude 6.2 quake that occurred on December 29 at a depth of 33.0 km (20.5 mi).
