= 1999 Aïn Témouchent earthquake =

Earthquake in Algeria

- Location within Algeria
- UTC time: 1999-12-22 17:36:56
- ISC event: 1658425
- USGS-ANSS: ComCat
- Local date: December 22, 1999
- Local time: 18:36:56
- Magnitude: 5.6 M_{w}
- Depth: 10 km (6 mi)
- Epicenter: 35.2°N 1.35°W
- Type: Reverse
- Total damage: $60.93 million
- Max. intensity: MMI VII (Very strong)
- Casualties: 22–25 dead 175 injured 15,000–25,000 displaced

The 1999 Aïn Témouchent earthquake occurred on December 22 at 18:36:56 local time in northern Algeria. The dip-slip event had a moment magnitude of 5.6 and a maximum Mercalli intensity of VII (Very strong). At least 22 were killed, 175 were injured, and 15,000–25,000 were made homeless. The Belgian Centre for Research on the Epidemiology of Disasters' EM-DAT database and the USGS' National Geophysical Data Center both list financial losses of $60.93 million.

== Tectonic setting ==
Aïn Témouchent lies within the Tell Atlas mountain range that runs southwest–northeast along the northern coast of Algeria. The current seismicity of the Tell Atlas is a result of continuing convergence of 3–6 mm per year between the African and Eurasian plates, in a northwest–southeast direction. The structures produced by the current phase of tectonics are reverse/thrust faults and fault-related folds.

The Quaternary aged Tafna Basin lies to the south of Aïn Témouchent. It is deformed along its northwestern margin by the active Tafna Fault. An anticline is developed in the hanging wall (upper block) of the northwest-dipping Tafna Fault known as the Berdani Fold.

== Earthquake ==
The earthquake had a magnitude of 5.6 M_{w}. The maximum felt intensity was VII on the Medvedev–Sponheuer–Karnik scale (MSK).The area affected by shaking of this level or greater was elongated southwest–northeast 42 km x 19 km across, including Aïn Témouchent at its northeastern end, and the epicenter as determined by the Center of Research in Astronomy, Astrophysics, and Geophysics (CRAAG). The focal mechanism is consistent with reverse faulting on a southwest–northeast trending fault.

The earthquake was followed by a sequence of aftershocks, which lasted for the next 14 months. The most important of these were a M3.5 event on May 27, 2000, a M3.7 event on July 30, 2000, and a M3.1 event, followed by another of M2.9 on January 4, 2001.

Due to the lack of any surface rupture that might constrain the causative fault, this has been investigated using Interferometric synthetic aperture radar (InSAR). The analysis used European Space Agency (ESA) ERS-2 SAR data. The observed fringes are consistent with a maximum displacement of 1 m on a 20 km long 32°-dipping blind thrust fault.

== Damage ==
Severe damage was observed in the epicentral area (I≥VII MSK). In Aïn Témouchent the main hospital, several schools and the post office were amongst the buildings badly damaged. Older houses were the most severely affected, many being destroyed. The worst damage was concentrated in areas close to the river that runs through the town. The villages of Ain Allen, Ain Kihal and Ain Tolba were also severely affected. About 3,000 homes were destroyed and a total of 15,000–25,000 were made homeless

Between 22 and 25 people were reported as being killed, with about a further 175 injured. Another three people were killed as a result of the M3.7 aftershock on July 30, 2000.

== See also ==
- List of earthquakes in 1999
- List of earthquakes in Algeria
