= 2010 Beni-Ilmane earthquakes =

Earthquakes in Algeria

2010 Algeria earthquake
- Location within Algeria
- UTC time: 2010-05-14 12:29:22
- ISC event: 14703080
- USGS-ANSS: ComCat
- Local date: 14 May 2010
- Local time: 13:29:22
- Magnitude: 5.3 M_{w}
- Depth: 2 km (1 mi)
- Epicenter: 35.9°N 4.12°E
- Type: Strike-slip
- Areas affected: Algeria
- Max. intensity: EMS-98 VII (Damaging)
- Aftershocks: 5.1 M_{w} May 16 at 06:52; 5.2 M_{w} May 23 at 13:28
- Casualties: 2 dead, 43 injured

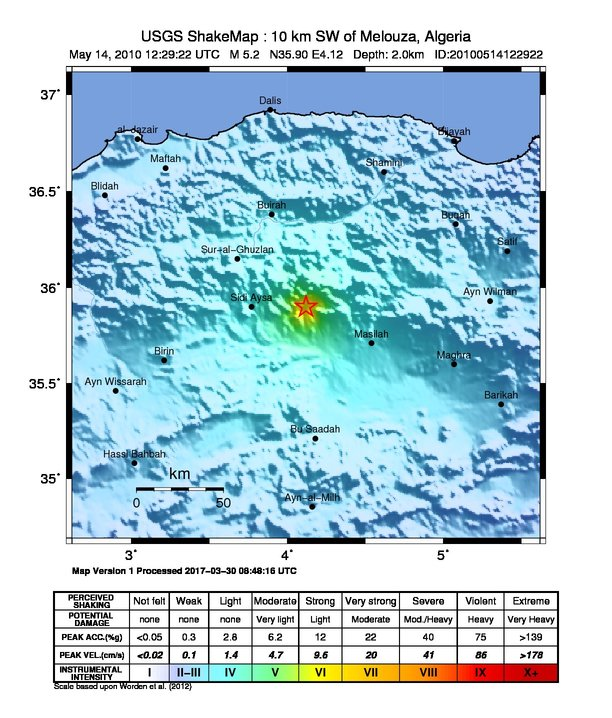
M 5.3 – Northern Algeria 14 May 2010

The 2010 Beni-Ilmane earthquakes began 14 May at 12:29:22 UTC, when a M_{w} 5.3 strike-slip earthquake occurred in Northern Algeria. With a maximum EMS-98 intensity of VII (Damaging), it was the first in a sequence of three shocks that affected the Bouïra Province over a ten-day period. Two people were killed, forty-three were injured, and some structural damage was reported.

== See also ==
- List of earthquakes in 2010
- List of earthquakes in Algeria
