= 1999 Sunda Strait earthquake =

Earthquake in Indonesia

1999 Sunda Strait Earthquake
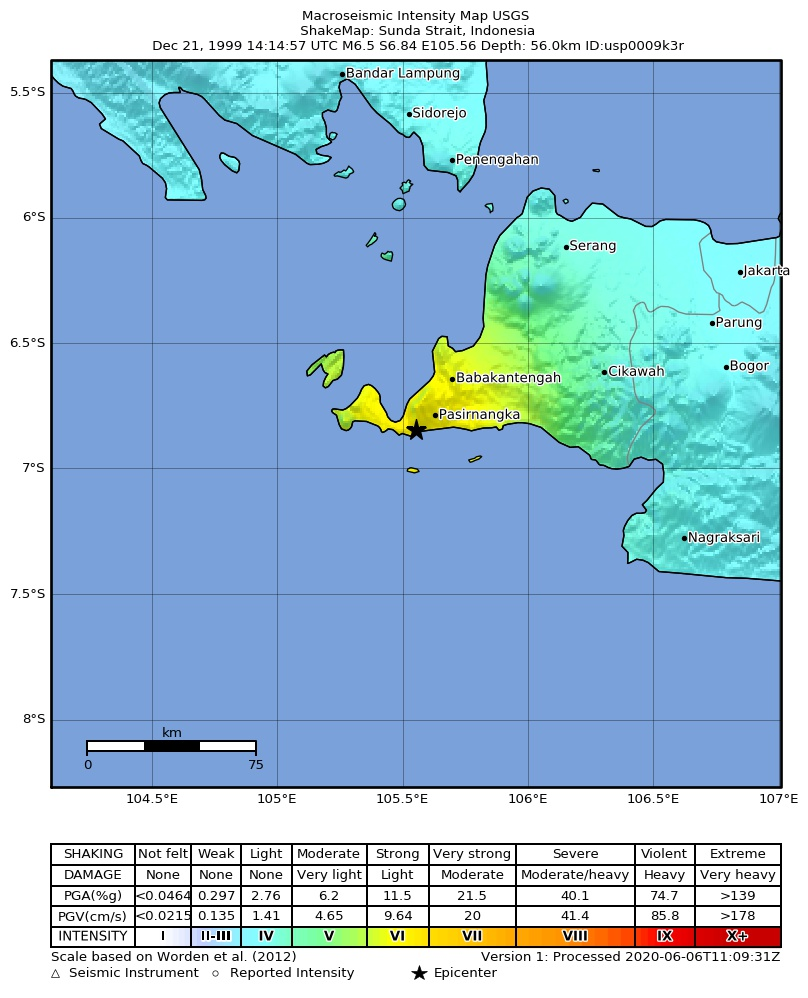
- USGS ShakeMap for the earthquake

- Location within Java Location within Indonesia
- UTC time: 1999-12-21 14:14:57
- ISC event: 2108724
- USGS-ANSS: ComCat
- Local date: 21 December 1999
- Local time: 21:14:57 WIB (UTC+7)
- Magnitude: 6.5 M_{w}
- Depth: 56.0 km (34.8 mi)
- Epicenter: 6.845°S 105.555°E
- Areas affected: Banten, Jakarta, West Java, Lampung
- Max. intensity: MMI VII (Very strong)
- Tsunami: No
- Casualties: 5 dead, 220 injured

The 1999 Sunda Strait earthquake occurred on 21 December at 21:14:57 local time in Sunda Strait region near the island of Java, Indonesia with a moment magnitude of 6.5.

== Earthquake ==
The earthquake struck at 21:14 (local time), at a moderate depth of 56 km. The earthquake was widely felt along the western part of Java and southeastern Sumatra. In Jakarta the shaking was moderate, in Bandung, Bekasi, and Liwa the shaking was weak.

== Damage ==
Five people were killed in Pandeglang, and more than 220 people were injured. 2,800 houses were damaged, mostly in western Java, where half of them were completely destroyed. Minor damage like cracks in walls were also reported in Jakarta.

== See also ==
- List of earthquakes in 1999
- List of earthquakes in Indonesia
- 2019 Sunda Strait earthquake
