= 1825 Blida earthquake =

Earthquake in Algeria

- Local date: 2 March 1825
- Local time: 07:00
- Magnitude: M_{w} 7.0
- Epicenter: 36.5°N 2.9°E
- Areas affected: Blida, Algeria
- Max. intensity: MMI X (Extreme)
- Casualties: >6,000 dead

The city of Blida in Algeria was struck by a major earthquake on 2 March 1825. It had an estimated magnitude of 7.0 M_{w} and a maximum felt intensity of X (Extreme) on the Modified Mercalli scale. It caused almost the complete destruction of Blida and led to the deaths of at least 6,000 of the inhabitants.

== Tectonic setting ==
Northern Algeria lies within the complex belt of collision between the African plate and the Eurasian plate. Blida is located at the southern margin of the Mitidja Basin, which is filled with Neogene aged sedimentary rocks. The southern boundary to this basin is formed by thrust faults of the Blida fold and thrust belt. The rupture of a fault within an offshore continuation of this zone, further to the northeast, is thought to have been responsible for the 2003 Boumerdès earthquake.

== Earthquake ==
The earthquake occurred at 07:00 local time. The maximum intensity of X on the Modified Mercalli scale has been used to estimate the magnitude as M_{w} 7.0. Over the next four days, there were ten significant aftershocks.

== Damage ==
The earthquake devastated Blida leaving very few buildings standing. It had no significant effects on Algiers, apart from some possible damage to the Casbah, although the city was only 50 km away from the epicentre. There were reports of widespread ground fissuring and both wells and springs were said to have dried up in the hours before the earthquake.

The total number of people killed was reported to be at least 6,000 and possibly much higher. The high death toll is explained by the timing of the earthquake during prayers, leaving many people crushed by collapsed mosques.
