= 1856 Djijelli earthquakes =

Earthquakes in northern Algeria

1856 Jijel earthquakes
- Local date: 21 & 22 August 1856
- Epicenter: 37.1°N 5.7°E
- Areas affected: Algeria
- Max. intensity: MMI IX (Violent)
- Tsunami: Yes
- Casualties: 3 dead

Two earthquakes occurred on August 21 and 22, 1856, near the coastal area of northern Algeria around the city of Jijel (known as Djidjelli during the colonial period). The magnitude of the two shocks are unknown, but each had a maximum Mercalli intensity of IX (Violent). Each of these high intensity shocks were felt as far as Genoa in Northern Italy and were followed by a tsunami that affected the Mediterranean Sea. Three people were killed as a result of the second event.

== See also ==
- List of earthquakes in Algeria
- List of historical earthquakes
- List of tsunamis
