= 1999 Tehuacán earthquake =

Earthquake in Mexico

- Location within Puebla (state) Location within Mexico
- UTC time: 1999-06-15 20:42:05
- ISC event: 1653844
- USGS-ANSS: ComCat
- Local date: 15 June 1999
- Local time: 15:42
- Magnitude: M_{w} 7.0
- Depth: 70 km (43 mi)
- Epicenter: 18.386°N 97.436°W
- Max. intensity: MMI VIII (Severe)
- Landslides: Yes
- Casualties: 14 dead, 200 injured

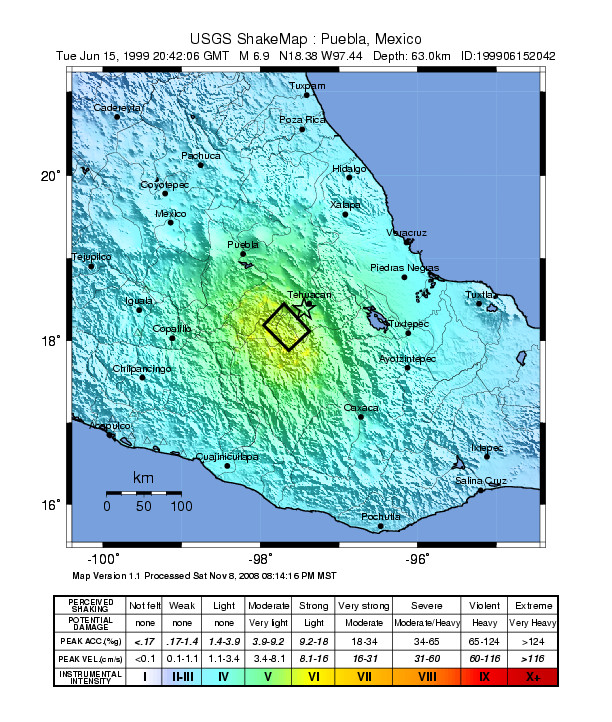
Shake map for Tehuacán earthquake

The 1999 Tehuacán earthquake, or the 1999 Central Mexico earthquake, occurred on June 15 at 15:42 local time (20:42 UTC) near Tehuacán, Puebla, Mexico, close to the state of Oaxaca. The earthquake measured 7.0 on the moment magnitude scale.

== Damage ==
Fourteen people were reported dead, and about 200 injured, many historic buildings and monuments were damaged. 5,306 houses were destroyed, 15,688 partially damaged, and 9,682 slightly damaged. Many houses collapsed in the state of Puebla, including parts of the Puebla City Hall. The state of Puebla was declared a disaster area.

== Geology ==
The Cocos plate is subducting beneath the North American plate in the Middle America Trench. This was an intraslab earthquake, and the epicenter had some distance from the Middle American Trench. This was the tenth earthquake since 1864 with magnitude larger than 6.5 and similar location of epicenter.

== See also ==
- List of earthquakes in 1999
- List of earthquakes in Mexico
