= 1954 Chlef earthquake =

Earthquake of the coast of Algeria

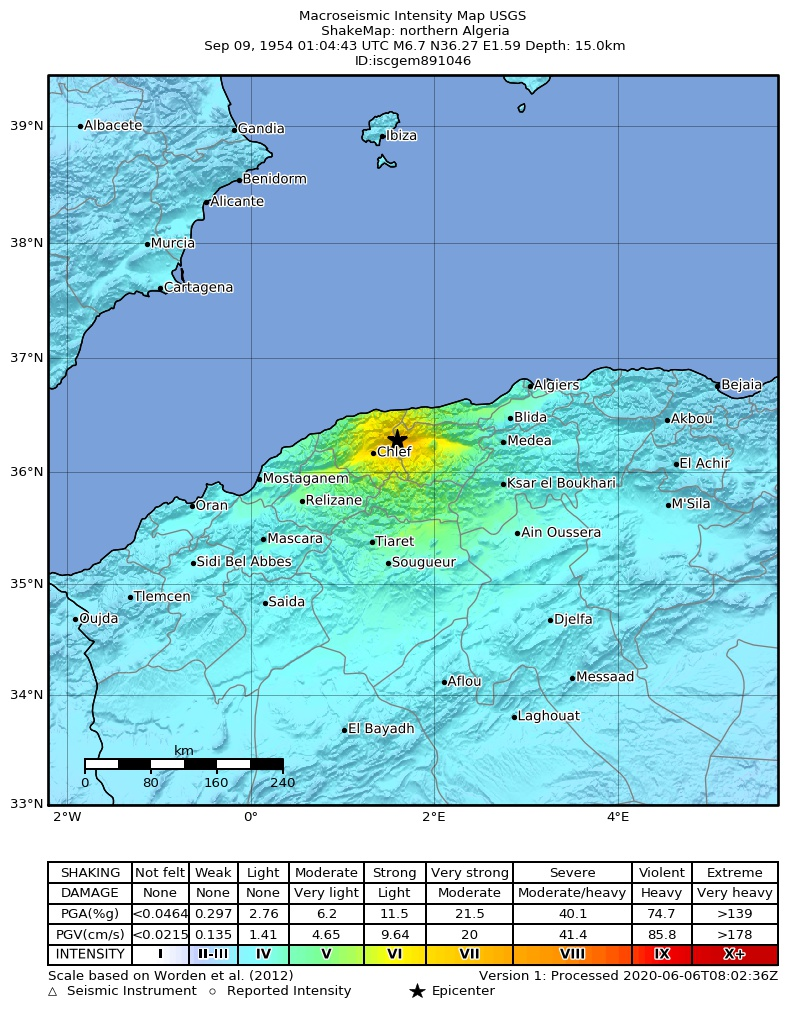

- Location within Algeria
- UTC time: 1954-09-09 01:04:43
- ISC event: 891046
- USGS-ANSS: ComCat
- Local date: 9 September 1954
- Local time: 02:04:43
- Magnitude: 6.7 M_{w}
- Depth: 15 km (9.3 mi)
- Epicenter: 36.27°N 1.59°E
- Type: Dip-slip
- Areas affected: El Asnam Province; French Algeria
- Total damage: $6 million
- Max. intensity: MMI XI (Extreme)
- Tsunami: 0.33 m (1 ft 1 in)
- Casualties: 1,243–1,409 dead 5,000 injured

The 1954 Chlef earthquake struck El Asnam Province in French Algeria on 9 September at 02:04:43 local time. The shock measured 6.7 on the moment magnitude scale and had a maximum Mercalli intensity of XI (Extreme). It destroyed Chlef, then named Orléansville, leaving over 1,243 people dead and 5,000 injured. Damage was estimated at $6 million. It was followed by multiple aftershocks. Algeria faces annual earthquakes and has undergone several changes to its earthquake building codes since its first earthquake engineering regulations from 1717.

== Geology ==
Powerful earthquakes strike Algeria annually, ranging in Mercalli intensity scale intensity from VI (Strong) to XI (Extreme). Chlef was hit by another major earthquake in 1980 which killed 3,500 people. The Atlas Mountains area faces aseismic deformation (change in shape not originating from movement of faults), with only marginal plate shifting each year. Both Chlef earthquakes originated from the same reverse fault zone.

The 1954 earthquake measured 6.7 on the moment magnitude scale according to the International Seismological Centre and had a depth of 15 km (9.3 mi). There is evidence of crustal shortening along a NW-SE trend near the epicenter, but the structure of any faults is poorly understood. Because Algeria has a thin shelf and a steep coastal slope, submarine landslides are quite common, especially during earthquakes. During the 1954 earthquake, five underwater telephone cables in the Mediterranean Sea were cut by an avalanche, three recording the exact time of impact.

== Damage and casualties ==
Shaking extended west to Mostaganem, south to Tiaret, and east to Tizi Ouzou, and many aftershocks followed the earthquake, including a major tremor at 22:18 UTC on 16 September which further damaged Orleansville. The main shock ruptured 16 km (9.9 mi) of rock, ripping faults and creating visible fissures in the ground along the Dahra Massif. Survivors described a sensation of rotating along an axis and that the rubble reminded them of "bombed cities in Europe." The United States Geological Survey lists the 1954 quake among the deadliest earthquakes in history. Agence France-Presse (AFP) reported that it was the worst earthquake in North African history.

== Aftermath ==
The French Army on the spot largely participated in the relief and triggered the first airlift aeromedical evacuation in Africa. Bell 47G helicopters, three Amiot AAC.1 Toucan and two Douglas DC-3 evacuated 396 victims, including 147 on the first day, avoiding any traffic jams on site.

Orléansville was devastated by the earthquake; a fifth of it wholly destroyed, it was rebuilt and renamed El Asnam and later Chlef. While Algeria had set earthquake resistance regulations as early as 1717, it was the 1954 earthquake that ushered in fully comprehensive reforms for seismic-resistant design.

== See also ==
- List of earthquakes in 1954
- List of earthquakes in Algeria
