= 1790 Oran earthquake =

Seismic event in Algeria

- Location within Algeria
- Local date: 10 October 1790
- Magnitude: M_{uk} 6.0–6.5
- Epicenter: 35.9°N 0.6°W
- Areas affected: Algeria, Spain and Tunisia
- Max. intensity: EMS-98 VIII (Heavily damaging) – EMS-98 X (Very destructive)
- Tsunami: Minor
- Casualties: 3,000 dead

The 1790 Oran earthquake occurred on 10 October, striking near the coastal city of Oran in Algeria. The earthquake had an evaluated maximum seismic intensity of VIII–X on the European macroseismic scale (EMS-98). An estimated 3,000 people died during the earthquake and accompanying tsunami. The magnitude of this earthquake has been disputed among members of the paleoseismology field, with estimates ranging from 7.5 to even as small as 5.5.

== Impact ==
Beginning on 8 October, the Spanish-conquered city was rocked by a series of strong earthquakes which were felt as far as Spain and Malta. The earthquakes were felt by residents in Granada, Cartagena, Málaga, and Santa Fe. Violent shaking was felt at Oran until 25 October. Major damage occurred in Oran, with much of the historic city destroyed. Reports of damage also came from Carthage, Tunisia, and Spain across the Mediterranean Sea.

On the morning of 10 October, at 01:15 local time, the most violent shock razed many homes in Oran to the ground, trapping 1,000 people. Multiple shocks occurred in the aftermath, causing destruction and killing many. Landslides were triggered, spilling debris into the city. Modern construction, and a fortress in the city remained intact after the shocks, and no damage was reported outside Oran.

According to the Gazeta de Madrid, over 250 soldiers were among the 3,000 killed, while some sources suggest up to 600 died. An alcazaba sustained severely, killing a commander general and his daughter. A number of high-ranking military officials were killed by collapsing structures. At least 86 prisoners, and 23 prison officials died when a jail collapsed. Half of the inmate population managed to escape.

Because the city streets were narrow, many survivors gathered at an open space right after the quake. Looting of personal belongings took place in the ruined city. In response, the colonial authorities announced capital punishment for anyone caught. Aid was provided to the survivors one week later, which included tents, food, and medical assistance. The governor of Oran was appointed by Charles IV of Spain to write a report on the earthquake a few days later. Damage to Oran and neighboring Mazalquivir were so severe that the Spanish Empire eventually left the cities in 1792 because repair works were not viable. Many of the Spanish residents in Algeria resettled in Ceuta.

== Tsunami ==
A notable tsunami was triggered during the quake, and witnessed by many at the coast. Sailors on ships were thrown overboard when the strong waves struck. Many residents ran from the coast as the tsunami approached. The waves inundated the coasts of North Africa, but no disturbance of the sea was reported in Morocco. Boats were taken from ports and drifted away. Small waves also struck the Iberian Peninsula in Almeria and Cartagena, wherein the latter location, the sea level rose by up to 6 feet.

== Tectonic setting ==
The nation of Algeria lies near a complex and poorly defined convergent plate boundary separating the African plate from the Eurasian plate. The converging plates create a zone of compression in northern Algeria, which are accommodated by mainly thrust and reverse faults onshore and inland. Thrusting of strata due to compression formed the Atlas Mountains in Algeria and Morocco. The tectonic situation of Algeria also makes the country vulnerable to large and deadly seismic events with magnitudes greater than 6.0. The offshore thrust faults also pose a tsunami threat to the Algerian coast during large earthquakes.

== Earthquake ==
Previous studies of earthquakes in Algeria and on this particular event have assigned the maximum seismic intensity at IX–X on the MSK-64, EMS-98 and Mercalli scales. Based on inferring the historical descriptions of the event, Oran was assigned IX–X, while intensities IV–V was felt in Almeria and Cartagena (IV). At Mers-El-Kébir, the felt intensity was IV–V based on literature reviews. A re-evaluation of more recent literature describing the earthquake suggests the intensity was only VIII. The severe damage which occurred was due to poor construction practices. The intensity most likely did not achieve IX level because at Mers-El-Kébir, a mere 8 km from Oran did not report any damage suggesting the intensity was weaker than previously thought. In a 2019 journal, the authors assigned the coastal areas of Oran, where the greatest damage was reported, intensity IX–X. Intensity IX–X was inferred from original Spanish documents describing the effects of the earthquake.

The high intensity shaking and tsunami generation is due to the shallow hypocenter depth and offshore epicenter location. According to Pedro María Legallois Grimarest, a military officer, the tremors began with the vertical movement of the ground and was followed by shaking in the southwest–northeast direction. This would suggest the earthquake rupture consisted of two sub-events on a reverse fault. The northwest coast of Oran hosts a reverse fault offshore which may be the source of the quake and tsunami. The source fault may be one that stretches from the sea to onshore. Based on considering the damage and tsunami, a seismic magnitude of 6.0–6.5 has been proposed for the event.

== Other events ==
On 6 June 2008, a M_{wc} 5.5 earthquake struck off the coast of Oran with a maximum felt intensity of VII on the EMS-98 scale or VI on the Mercalli. The earthquake killed one person and caused dozens of injuries. The moment tensor solution indicated reverse faulting at a shallow depth with an epicenter offshore. The faults offshore are activated by northwest–southeast compression as a result of the Africa-Eurasia convergence in the Mediterranean.

== See also ==
- List of earthquakes in Algeria
- List of historical earthquakes
