= 2003 Boumerdès earthquake =

Magnitude 6.8 earthquake in Algeria

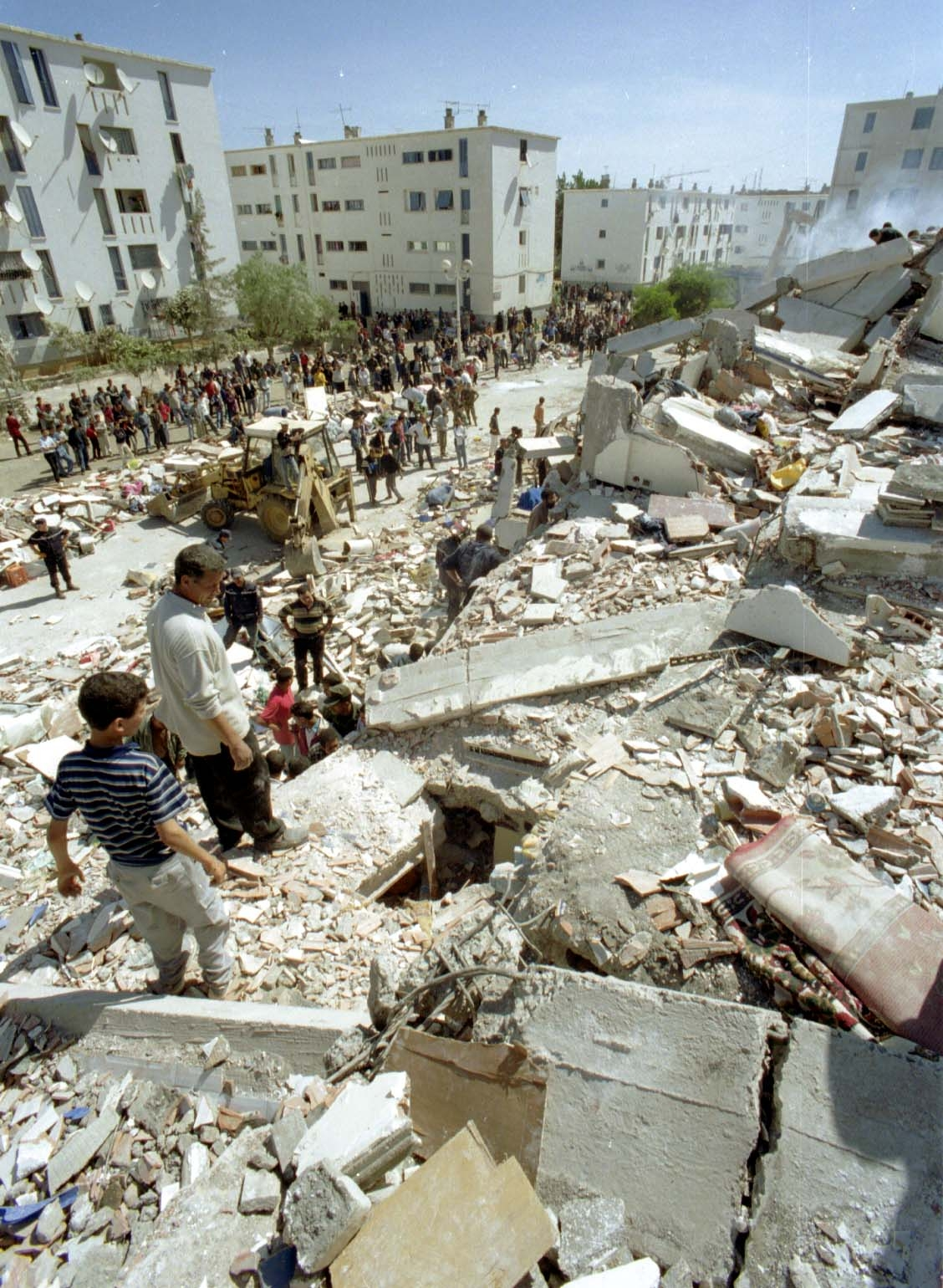
- UTC time: 2003-05-21 18:44:20
- ISC event: 6845775
- USGS-ANSS: ComCat
- Local date: May 21, 2003
- Local time: 19:44:21
- Magnitude: 6.8 M_{w}
- Depth: 12 km (7.5 mi)
- Epicenter: 36.91°N 3.71°E
- Type: Dip-slip
- Areas affected: Algeria
- Total damage: $5 billion
- Max. intensity: MMI X (Extreme)
- Peak acceleration: 0.58 g
- Tsunami: 3 m (10 ft)
- Casualties: 2,266 killed, 10,261 injured

The 2003 Boumerdès earthquake occurred on May 21 at 19:44:21 local time in northern Algeria. The shock had a moment magnitude of 6.8 and a maximum Mercalli intensity of X (Extreme). The epicentre of the earthquake was located near the town of Thénia in Boumerdès Province, approximately 60 km east of the capital Algiers. The quake was the strongest to hit Algeria in more than twenty years – since 1980, when a magnitude 7.1 earthquake resulted in at least 2,633 deaths.

== Tectonic setting ==
Northern Algeria is situated at the boundary between the African plate and the Eurasian plate, thus creating a zone of compression. This zone of compression manifests itself by several thrust and faults. Due to this location between two tectonic plates, many earthquakes occurred in the region. The mechanism of the earthquake on May 21 corresponds to a northeast-striking thrust fault named Zemmouri fault which was identified for the first time after this earthquake. According to the United States Geological Survey,

The earthquake occurred in the boundary region between the Eurasian plate and the African plate. Along this section of the plate boundary, the African plate is moving northwestward against the Eurasian plate with a velocity of about 6 mm per year. The relative plate motions create a compressional tectonic environment, in which earthquakes occur by thrust-faulting and strike-slip faulting. Analysis of seismic waves generated by this earthquake shows that it occurred as the result of thrust-faulting.

== Damage and casualties ==
Approximately 2,266 people died, 10,261 injured, and 200,000 left homeless as a result of the earthquake. Reports indicate more than 1,243 buildings were completely or partially destroyed. Infrastructure was predictably damaged in Algiers, Boumerdès, Réghaïa and Thénia; roads in Algeria are generally of high quality, but many city streets and local roads were difficult to traverse because of debris from collapsed buildings. Bridges are constructed similarly to those in the US, with precast steel girders supporting a concrete deck. A few days after the earthquake, three major highway bridges were still closed. The last highway bridge to open was the Hussein Dey Bridge on July 5.

The quake generated a localized tsunami, which damaged boats off the coast of the Balearic Islands. The eastern side of Algiers was affected most; overall, the Boumerdès Province was the hardest-hit region. According to officials, roughly 400 people were killed in Algiers only. In the Boumerdès Province, several cities were heavily damaged, with Thénia, Zemmouri, and Boumerdès, being the worst affected. Many buildings built in the early twentieth century during the colonial rule suffered heavy damage in the Belcourt, Bab-El-Oued and El-Casbah areas in Algiers Province.

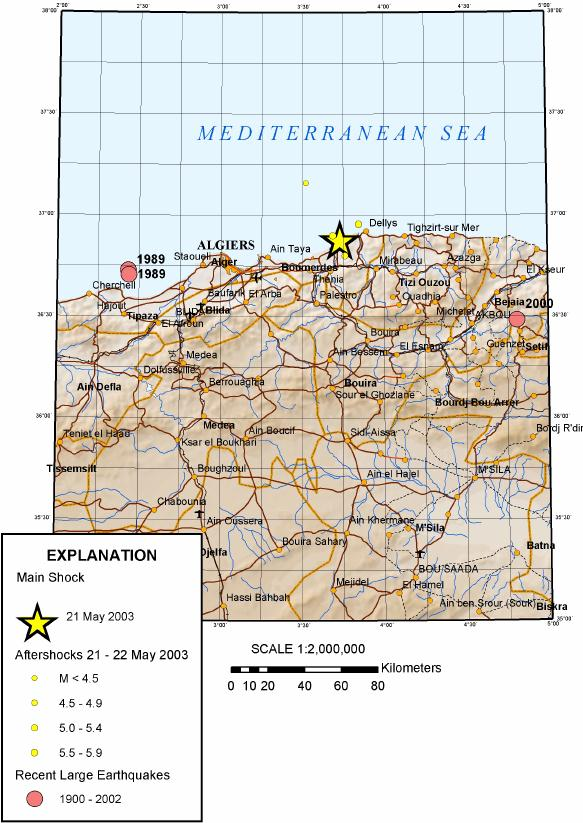
Map of the affected area

According to the Algerian Ministry of Housing, in the Algiers Province only approximately 554 schools suffered light damage, while nearly 330 schools received moderate damage and 11 were heavily damaged or completely destroyed. The University of Boumerdès was severely damaged, and many buildings in the area collapsed. Damage was also reported to the University of Science and Technology in Bab Ezzouar, which has the largest university campus in Algeria.

A water treatment plant in Boudouaou, which provides more than 12% of the treated water to the Boumerdès and Algiers, suffered light damage to the clarifiers and clear water storage tanks. The water pipeline from the Keddara Dam to the water treatment plant was broken at a concrete junction structure at the dam, as well as at the treatment plant. The main power plant in Cap Djenet suffered minor to moderate damage. A high voltage switch yard located near Réghaïa had heavy damage.

Société Nationale des Transports Ferrovaires, Algeria's state-owned railway company, suffered track damage near the town of Thénia. Some tracks were also blocked by debris of destroyed buildings. Eighteen bridges in the affected region had minor to moderate damage. Cracks developed in some roads and highways. The port of Algiers, which at that time handled approximately 40% of the national cargo traffic, suffered light to moderate damage due to soil liquefaction and settlement caused by the earthquake. Port operations was reportedly reduced by 30% immediately after the quake. The minor ports in Zemmouri and Dellys received little damage. The airport control tower and terminal were moderately damaged.

The earthquake had significant effect on local communication. An 8,000 switch central office in the El Harrach area of Algiers completely destroyed and another 20,000 switch office was heavily damaged. Central offices in Boumerdes, Zemmouri and Tidjelabine were damaged. Submarine telecommunication cables also suffered damage. Two underwater fiber optic cables between Algeria and Spain received heavy damage due to undersea landslide caused by the quake.

== Relief efforts ==
Many nations sent rescue teams to help in the search for earthquake survivors. International teams of relief workers went to the spot and became involved in rescuing people still trapped under rubble. International relief agencies engaged in supplies like shelter, food and water to the people who became homeless due to the quake. Sniffer dogs sent to Algeria to find survivors trapped under rubble. The International Red Cross and Red Crescent Movement co-ordinated the relief efforts. Medical and rescue teams were dispatched from European countries. The Red Cross of the People's Republic of China donated $50,000. Trucks were called into service to remove dead bodies from Algiers and surrounding towns and villages. Army units were deployed to assist the relief effort. Prime Minister Ahmed Ouyahia announced an aid of $7,000 for each victim. The government dispatched several ambulances, police personnel and electrical workers into the affected area. Tents, ambulances and engineering equipment were brought by the army. Water trucks were dispatched to the quake affected villages.

=== Response from other countries ===
- France: Jacques Chirac expressed the sympathy and solidarity of the French people and promised all necessary aid. France immediately provided human and material assistance. Transall aircraft of the Air Force took off with rescue specialists, followed by firefighters from Marseille and medical units.
- Canada: Canada pledged approximately $150,000 for search and rescue works to find survivors.
- Egypt: Egypt sent a team of physicians and medicines to Algeria.
- Germany: Germany sent 25 rescue workers to the affected region.
- Iceland: Iceland sent ICE-SAR rubble rescue team.
- Morocco: Morocco sent a medical team along with medicines to Algeria.
- Pakistan: Pakistan sent relief goods for the earthquake victims. A special flight containing 2,500 blankets, 200 tents and 31 cartons of medicines was dispatched to Algeria.
- People's Republic of China: The People's Republic of China dispatched a team of rescue workers from the China International Search and Rescue (CISAR), PRC's main organization for international earthquake rescue work, to Algeria to search for survivors.
- Poland: Poland sent 27 rescue workers from Gdańsk with expert equipment, maintaining readiness to send further reinforcements, and the Polish Medical Mission sent medical supplies.
- Russia: Physicians and rescue workers were dispatched from Moscow.
- Saudi Arabia: Saudi Arabia sent aircraft carrying 102 tons of foodstuffs and tents.
- South Africa: South Africa sent recovery teams to Algeria.
- Sweden: Sweden sent sniffer dogs to Algeria.
- Switzerland: Switzerland sent sniffer dogs to search survivors. A 90-member recovery team was dispatched to the Boumerdès area.
- United Kingdom: United Kingdom sent nearly 100 rescue workers.
- United States: US President George W. Bush assured Bouteflika of "the support and friendship of the United States".

=== Public anger ===
There was anger among the survivors over the fact that the local authorities did not provide them with temporary shelters. Government officials virtually did not take part in the relief efforts, but Islamic charities tried to provide quick assistance. The inability of the state to effectively respond to the disaster led to widespread criticism. The effects of the earthquake became worse because the construction industry in Algeria did not apply rigorous safety standards of earthquake engineering to build earthquake-proof buildings and several buildings lacked the architecture to withstand earthquakes. New housing blocks constructed by the government and by individual builders were destroyed by the quake, but private building from the French period withstood the earthquake. This was another cause of public anger. Some people claimed that officials saved money by using below-standard material in construction projects. Many angry protesters threw debris when President Abdelaziz Bouteflika and Minister of State for the Interior and Local Authorities, Noureddine Yazid Zerhouni, tried to visit some affected regions. A crowd kicked and stoned the car of Bouteflika when he visited Boumerdès shouting "pouvoir assassin" ("murdering power"). Prime Minister Ouyahia expressed the view of possibility of corruption in the construction sector. A commission of inquiry was set up by the government to investigate the faulty construction of several buildings which collapsed in the quake.

== See also ==
- List of earthquakes in 2003
- List of earthquakes in Algeria
- 2004 Al Hoceima earthquake
- 2023 Al Haouz earthquake
