= 1980 El Asnam earthquake =

7.1 magnitude earthquake on the Algerian coast

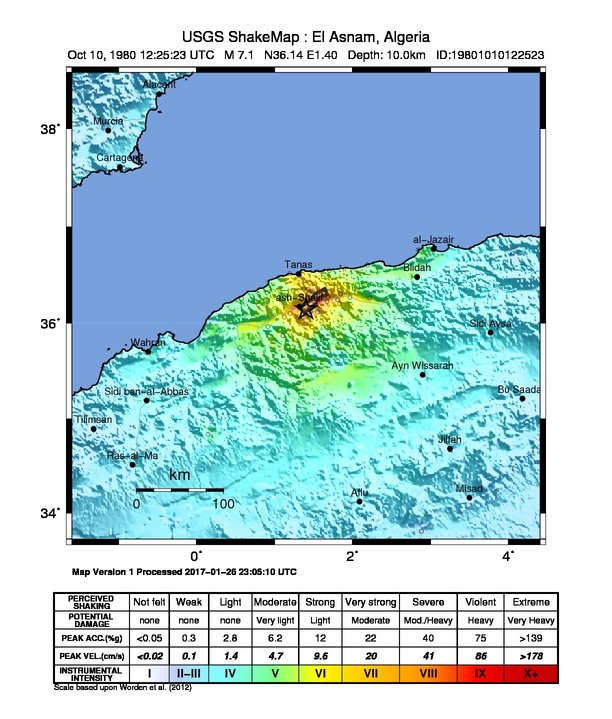

- UTC time: 1980-10-10 12:25:23
- ISC event: 636856
- USGS-ANSS: ComCat
- Local date: October 10, 1980
- Local time: 13:25:23
- Duration: 35 seconds
- Magnitude: 7.1 M_{w}
- Depth: 10 km (6.2 mi)
- Epicenter: 36.2°N 1.37°E
- Fault: El Asnam
- Type: Dip-slip
- Areas affected: Chlef Province; Algeria
- Max. intensity: MMI X (Extreme)
- Tsunami: 0.7 m (2 ft 4 in)
- Aftershocks: 6.2 M_{w} Oct 10 at 15:39 UTC
- Casualties: 2,633–5,000 dead 8,369–9,000 injured

The 1980 El Asnam earthquake occurred on October 10 at 13:25:23 local time with a moment magnitude of 7.1 and a maximum Mercalli intensity of X (Extreme). The shock occurred in the Algerian town of El Asnam (now known as Chlef). The shocks were felt over 550 km (340 mi) away, with the initial earthquake lasting 35 seconds. It was the largest earthquake in Algeria, and was followed three hours later by a magnitude 6.2 aftershock. The earthquake created about 42 km (26 mi) of surface rupture and had a vertical slip of up to 4.2 m (14 ft). No foreshocks were recorded. The earthquake was found to have occurred very close to the epicenter of the 1954 Chlef earthquake using joint epicenter determination techniques. It occurred at a previously unknown reverse fault.

The earthquake was the largest in the Atlas range since 1790.

In addition to the earthquake, weak tsunami waves were recorded on tide gauges.

The earthquake occurred at a populated region of Algeria, affecting 900,000 people. It destroyed 25,000 houses and made 300,000 inhabitants homeless. In addition to destroying homes, the earthquake also demolished critical infrastructure, including the main hospital, the central mosque, and a girls' school. The hospital was damaged significantly enough that victims had to be transported more than 160 km (100 mi) away to the next nearest hospital. Both events caused considerable damage with at least 2,633 killed and 8,369 injured. The earthquake caused approximately $5.2 billion in damage, which was 22% of Algeria's GDP at the time.

== See also ==
- 1954 Chlef earthquake
- List of earthquakes in 1980
- List of earthquakes in Algeria
