= Kawazu-Nanadaru Loop Bridge =

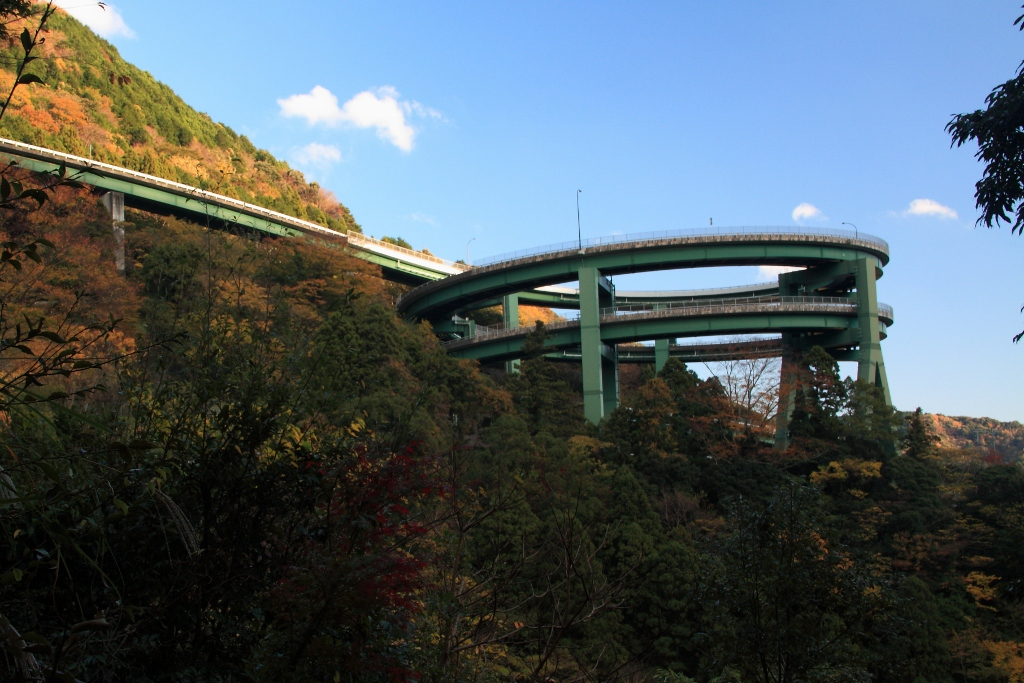
- Coordinates: 34°47′24″N 138°56′24″E
- Carries: Japan National Route 414
- Locale: Kawazu, Shizuoka Prefecture, Japan

Characteristics
- Design: Spiral bridge
- Total length: 1,064 m (3,491 ft)
- Height: 45 m (148 ft)

History
- Opened: 1981

The Kawazu-Nanadaru Loop Bridge (河津七滝ループ橋, Kawazu-Nanadaru Rūpu-kyō) is a bridge located in Kawazu, Shizuoka on Japan National Route 414 connecting Numazu to Shimoda, in Japan's Izu Peninsula southwest of Tokyo.

== Description ==
The Kawazu-Nanadaru Loop Bridge is a double spiral bridge with a height of 45 m (148 ft), 80 m (260 ft) in diameter, and a total length of 1,064 m (3,491 ft).

From the direction of Shimoda/Kawazu Station, it goes uphill counterclockwise, and from the direction of Izu/Amagi Tunnel, it goes downhill clockwise. It loops 720 degrees (or 360 degrees twice). The carriage is one lane on each side, but the speed limit is limited to 40 km (25 mi) per hour to prevent the danger of vehicles passing through this bridge, and overtaking is prohibited. In addition to cars and motorcycles, bicycles can also pass through.

== History ==
In the past, National Route 414 used hairpin turns along the mountain, but it collapsed due to the 1978 Izu Ōshima earthquake and the road on the hillside was cut off. After that, the convenience of passage and the height difference were eliminated, and a construction method was adopted stemming from the lessons learned from landslides caused by the earthquake. In 1981, the Kawazu-Nanadaru Loop Bridge was opened. In the same year, it won the Tanaka Award from the Japan Society of Civil Engineers.
