= Miyagi earthquake =

Miyagi earthquake may refer to:

- 1936 Miyagi earthquake
- 1978 Miyagi earthquake
- 2003 Miyagi earthquakes
- 2005 Miyagi earthquake
- 2011 Tōhoku earthquake
- April 2011 Miyagi earthquake
- March 2021 Miyagi earthquake

== See also ==
- 2008 Iwate–Miyagi Nairiku earthquake
- Fukushima earthquake (disambiguation)
