= Wharf =

Shoreside structure where ships dock

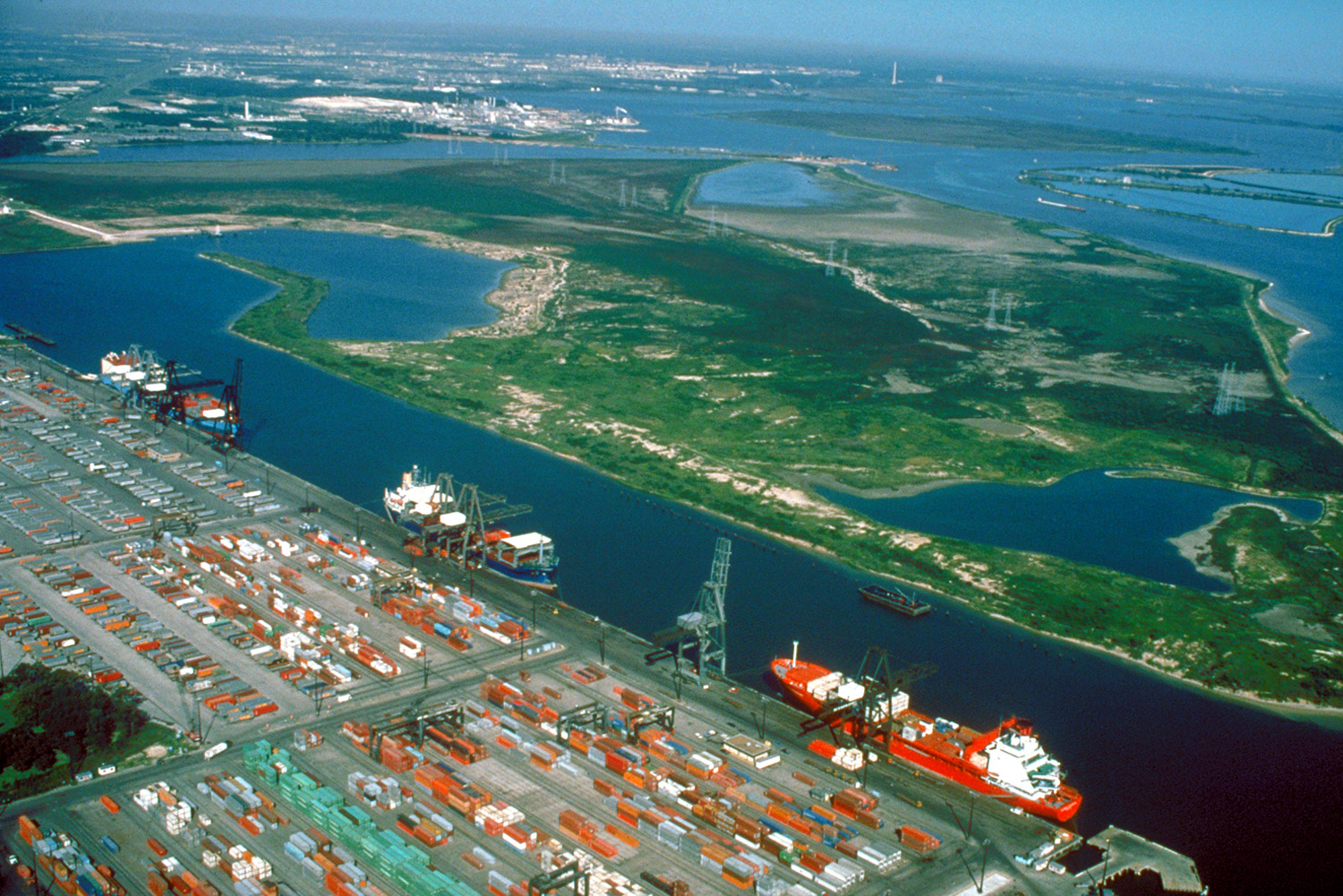
The Barbours Cut Terminal of the Port of Houston, U.S. This cargo shipping terminal has a single large wharf with multiple berths.

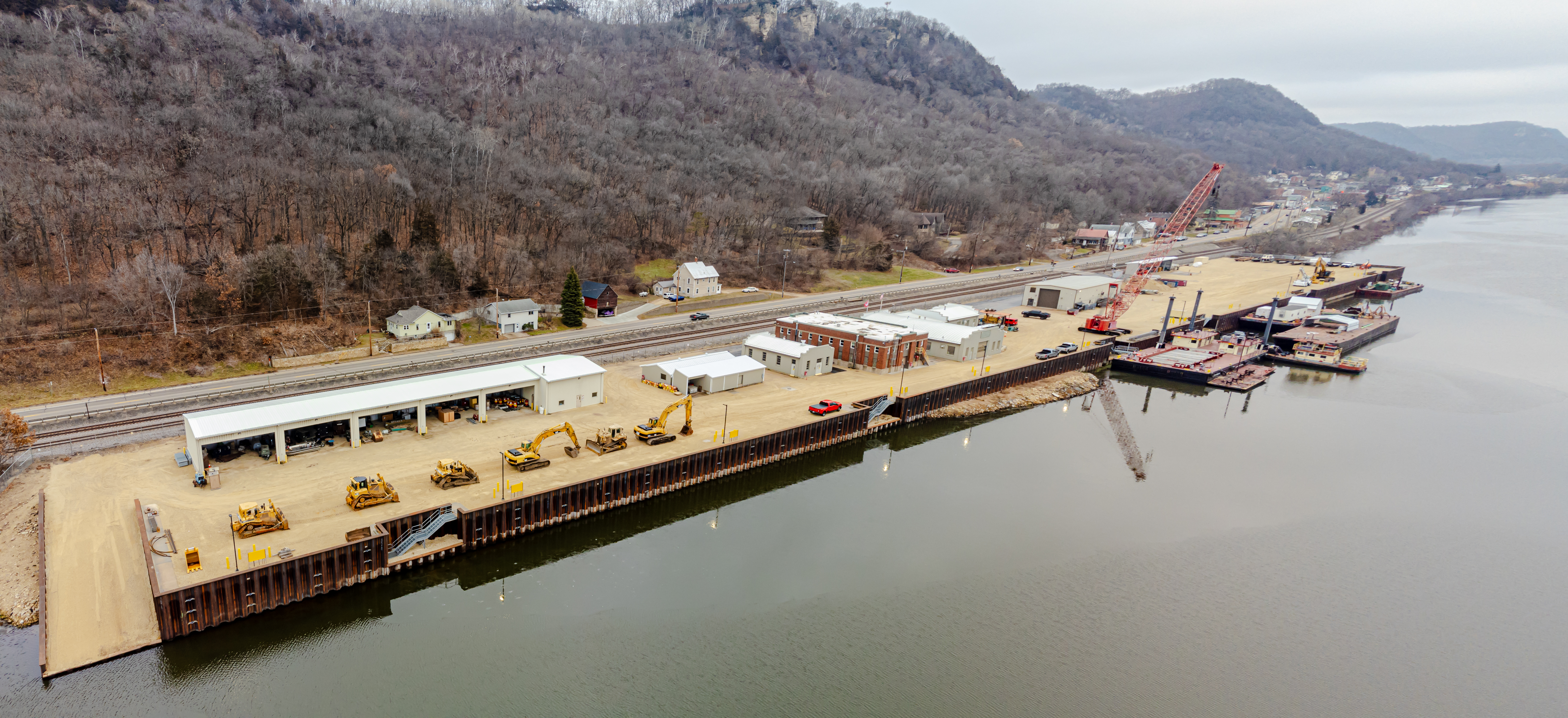
Wharf under construction on the Upper Mississippi in Fountain City, Wisconsin

A wharf (pl. wharves or wharfs), quay (/kiː/ KEE, or /k(w)eɪ/ K(W)AY), staith, or staithe is a structure on the shore of a harbor or on the bank of a river or canal where ships may dock to load and unload cargo or passengers. Such a structure includes one or more berths (mooring locations), and may also include piers, warehouses, or other facilities necessary for handling the ships. Wharves are often considered to be a series of docks at which boats are stationed. A marginal wharf is connected to the shore along its full length.

== Overview ==
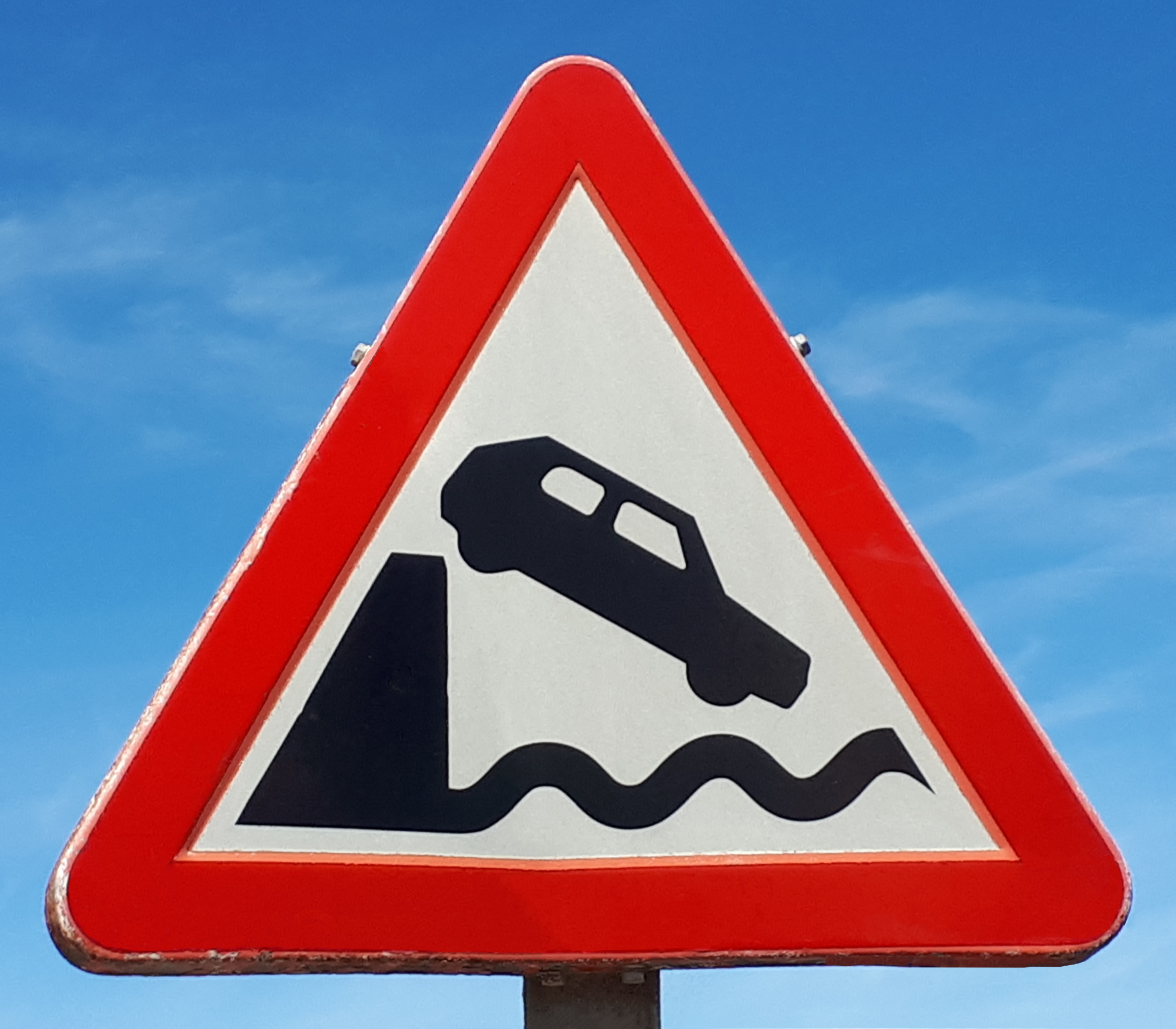
Traffic sign: Quayside or river bank ahead. Unprotected quayside or riverbank.

A wharf commonly comprises a fixed platform, often on pilings. Commercial ports may have warehouses that serve as interim storage: where it is sufficient a single wharf with a single berth constructed along the land adjacent to the water is normally used; where there is a need for more capacity multiple wharves, or perhaps a single large wharf with multiple berths, will instead be constructed, sometimes projecting over the water. A pier, raised over the water rather than within it, is commonly used for cases where the weight or volume of cargos will be low.

Smaller and more modern wharves are sometimes built on flotation devices (pontoons) to keep them at the same level as the ship, even during changing tides.

In everyday parlance the term quay (pronounced 'key') is common in the United Kingdom, Canada, Australia, and many other Commonwealth countries, and the Republic of Ireland, and may also refer to neighbourhoods and roadways running along the wayside (for example, Queen's Quay in Toronto and Belfast). The term wharf is more common in the United States. In some contexts wharf and quay may be used to mean pier, berth, or jetty.

In old ports such as London (which once had around 1700 wharves) many old wharves have been converted to residential or office use.

Certain early railways in England referred to goods loading points as "wharves". The term was carried over from marine usage. The person who was resident in charge of the wharf was referred to as a "wharfinger".

== Etymology ==
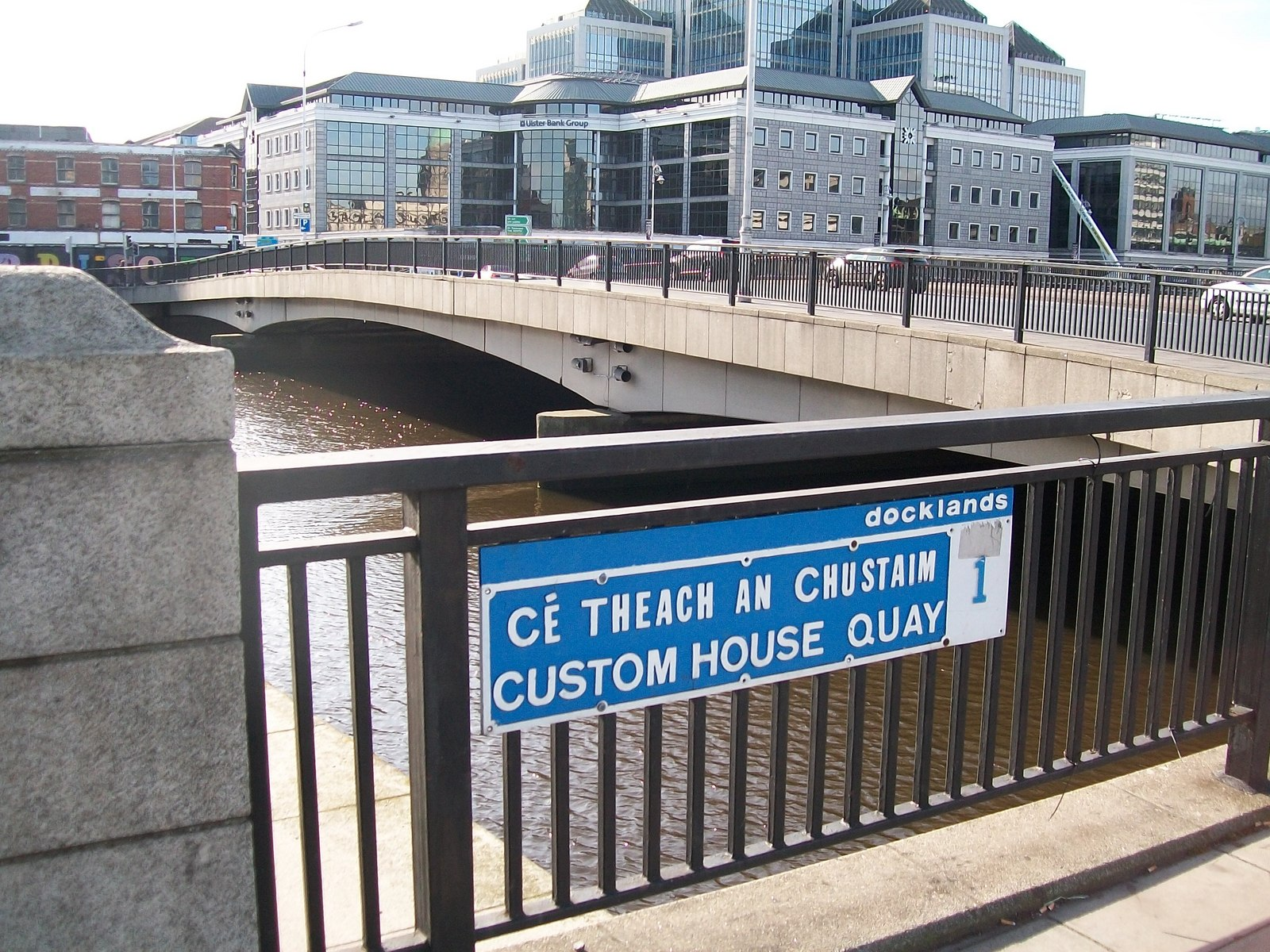
Quay in Dublin, Ireland. The Irish language term cé is a borrowing from Anglo-Norman kay, cail.

=== Wharf ===
The word wharf comes from the Old English hwearf, cognate to the Old Dutch word werf, which both evolved to mean "yard", an outdoor place where work is done, like a shipyard (Dutch: scheepswerf) or a lumberyard (Dutch: houtwerf). Originally, werf or werva in Old Dutch (werf, wer in Old Frisian) simply referred to inhabited ground that was not yet built on (similar to "yard" in modern English), or alternatively to a terp. This could explain the name Ministry Wharf located at Saunderton, just outside High Wycombe, which is nowhere near any body of water. In support of this explanation is the fact that many places in England with "wharf" in their names are in areas with a high Dutch influence, for example the Norfolk broads.

=== Staith ===
In the northeast and east of England the term staith or staithe (from the Norse for landing stage) is also used. The two terms have historically had a geographical distinction: those to the north in the Kingdom of Northumbria used the Old English spelling staith, southern sites of the Danelaw took the spelling staithe. Both originally referred to jetties or wharves. In time, the northern coalfields of Northumbria developed coal staiths specifically for loading coal onto ships and these would adopt the staith spelling as a distinction from simple wharves: for example, Dunston Staiths in Gateshead and Brancaster Staithe in Norfolk. However, the term staith may also be used to refer only to loading chutes or ramps used for bulk commodities like coal in loading ships and barges.

=== Quay ===
Quay, on the other hand, has its origin in the Proto-Celtic language. Before it changed to its current form under influence of the modern French quai, its Middle English spelling was key, keye or caye. This in turn also came from the Old Norman cai (Old French / French chai "wine cellar"), meaning originally "earth bank near a river", then "bank built at a port to allow ship docking". The French term quai comes, through Picard or Norman-French, from Gaulish caio, ultimately tracing back to the Proto-Celtic *kagio- "to encompass, enclose". Modern cognates include Welsh cae "fence, hedge" and Cornish ke "hedge".

== Gallery ==
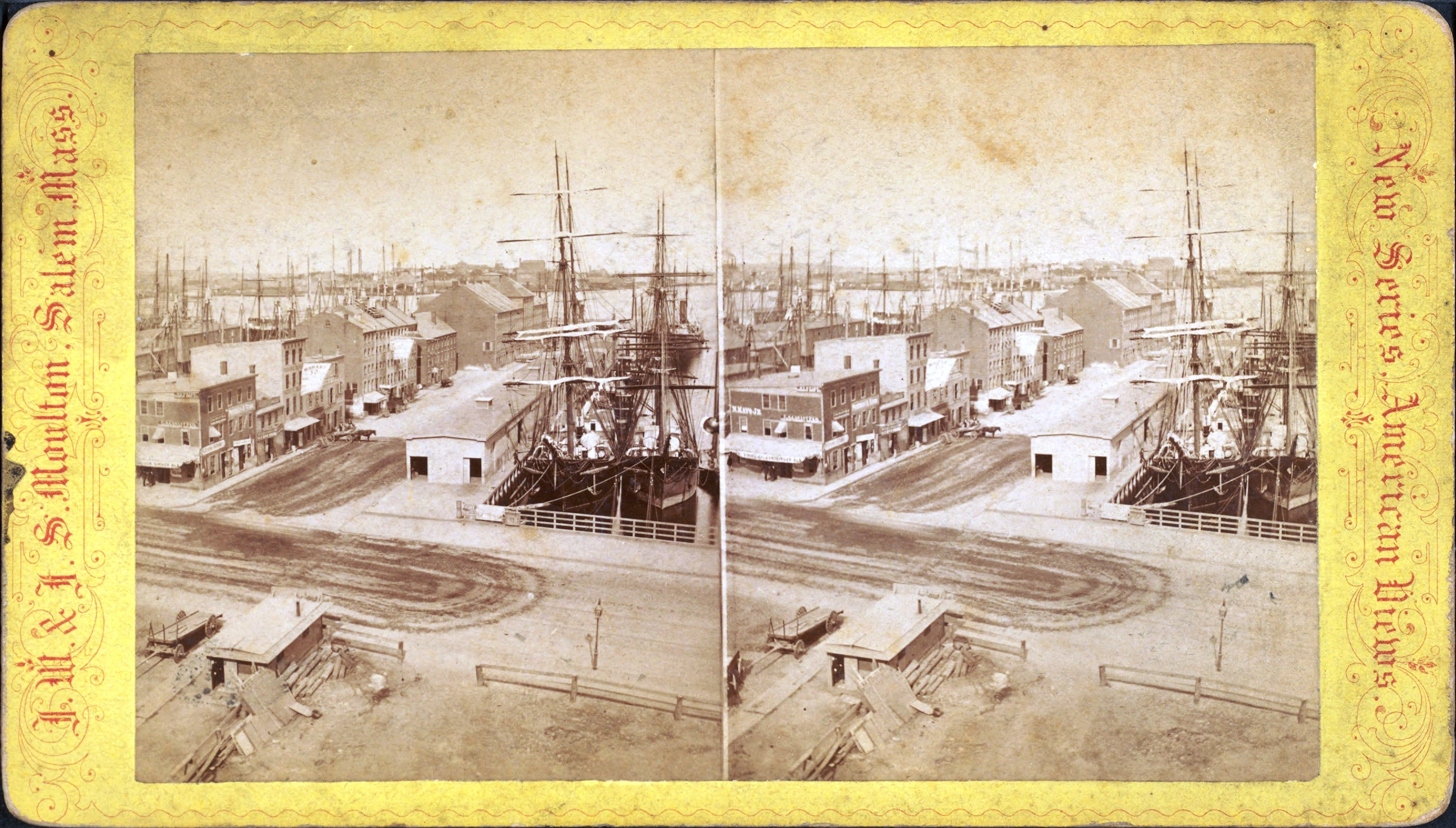
Stereoscopic view of Long Wharf in Boston, United States, c. 19th century, jutting into Boston Harbor

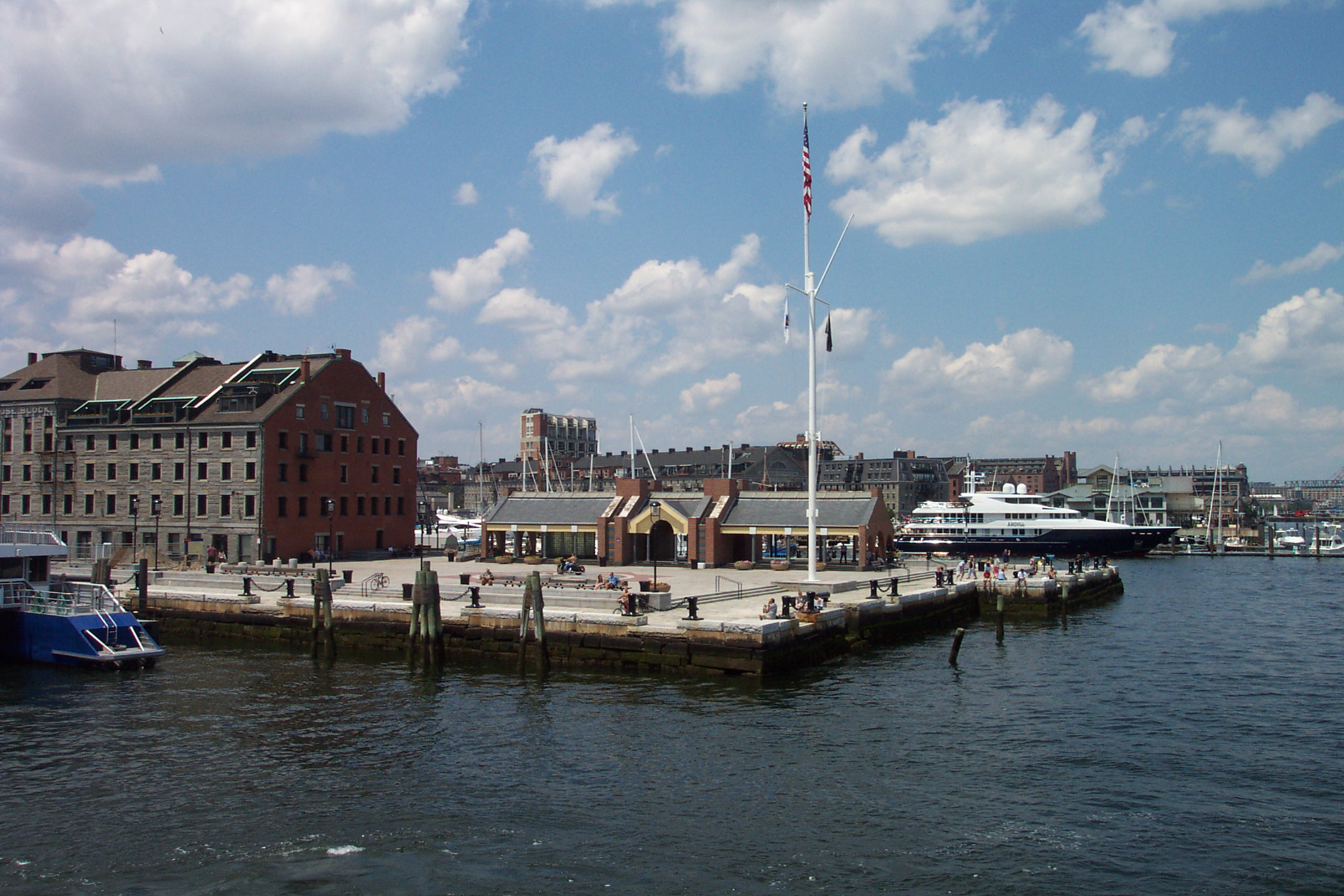
Modern view of Boston's Long Wharf (2006)

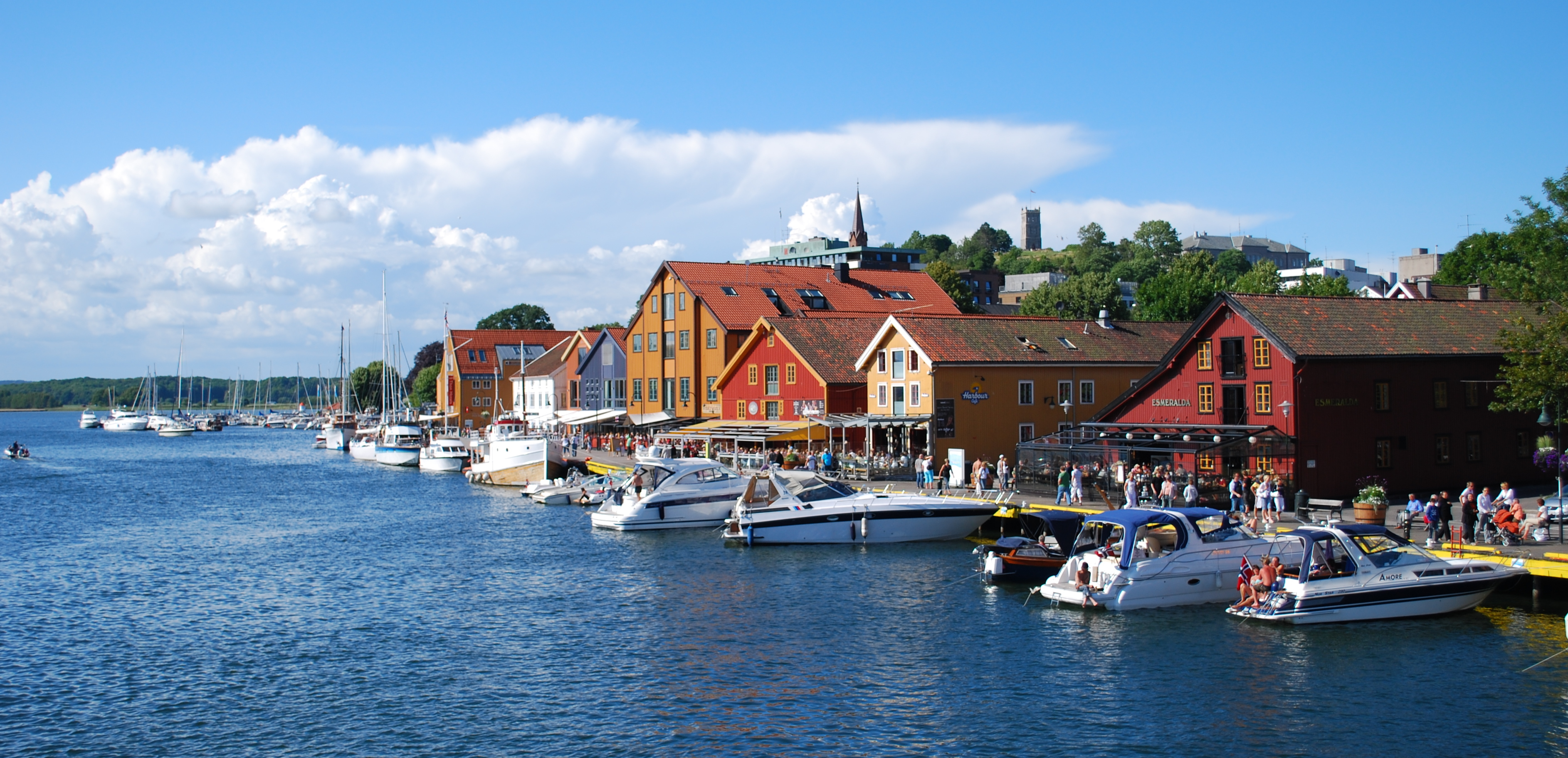
The Tønsberg City wharf in Tønsberg, Norway, is a popular tourist attraction, and its restaurants and pubs attract many visitors during the summer seasons.

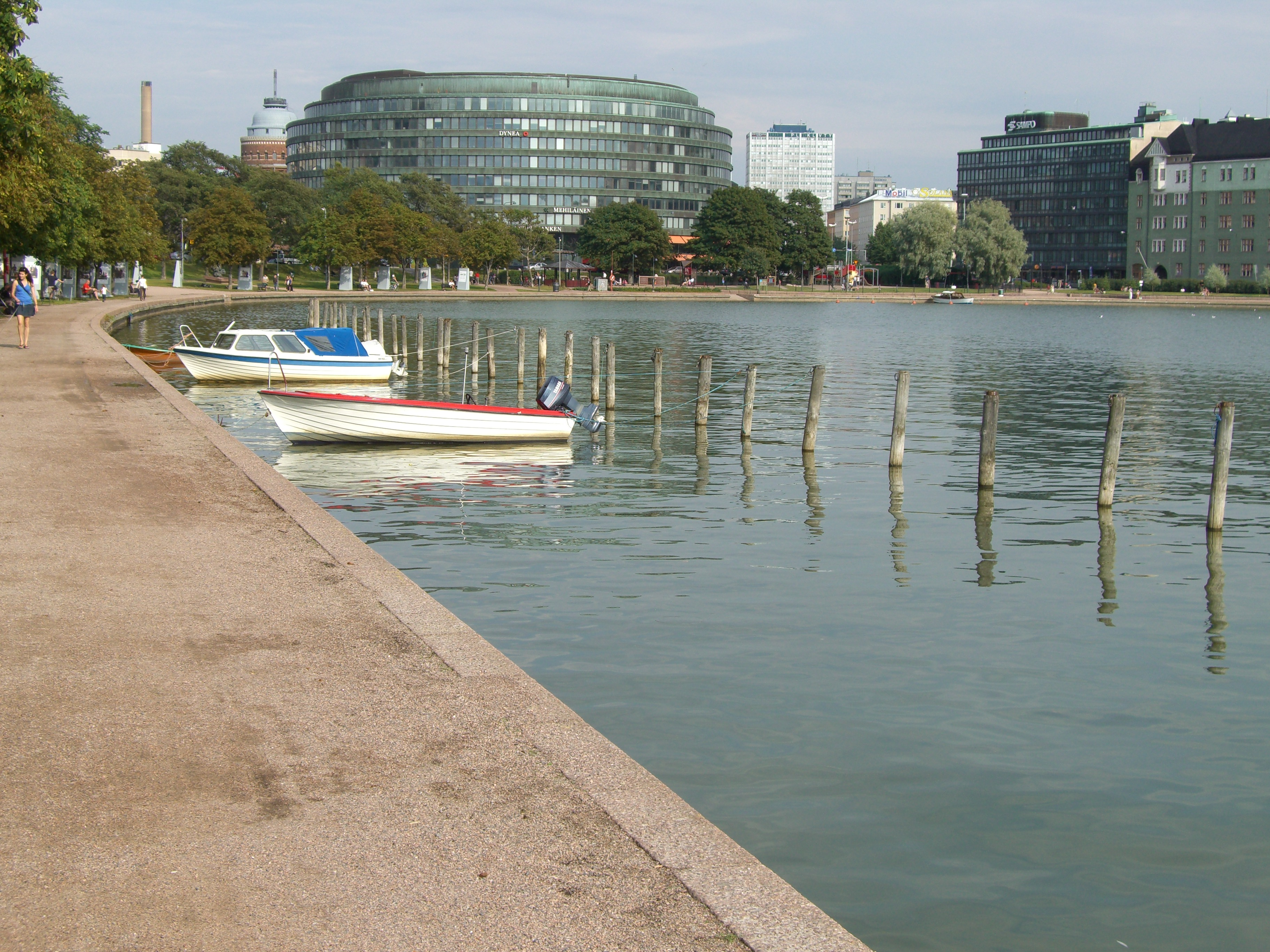
The shore of the Tokoinranta wharf in Hakaniemi, Helsinki, Finland (2007)

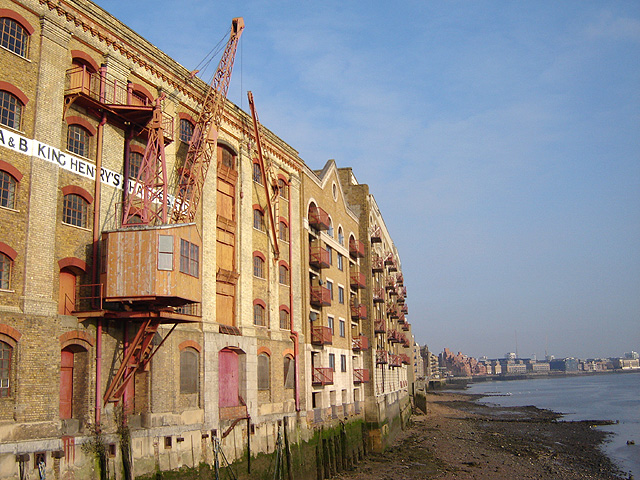
King Henry's Wharves, typical London wharves converted to apartments

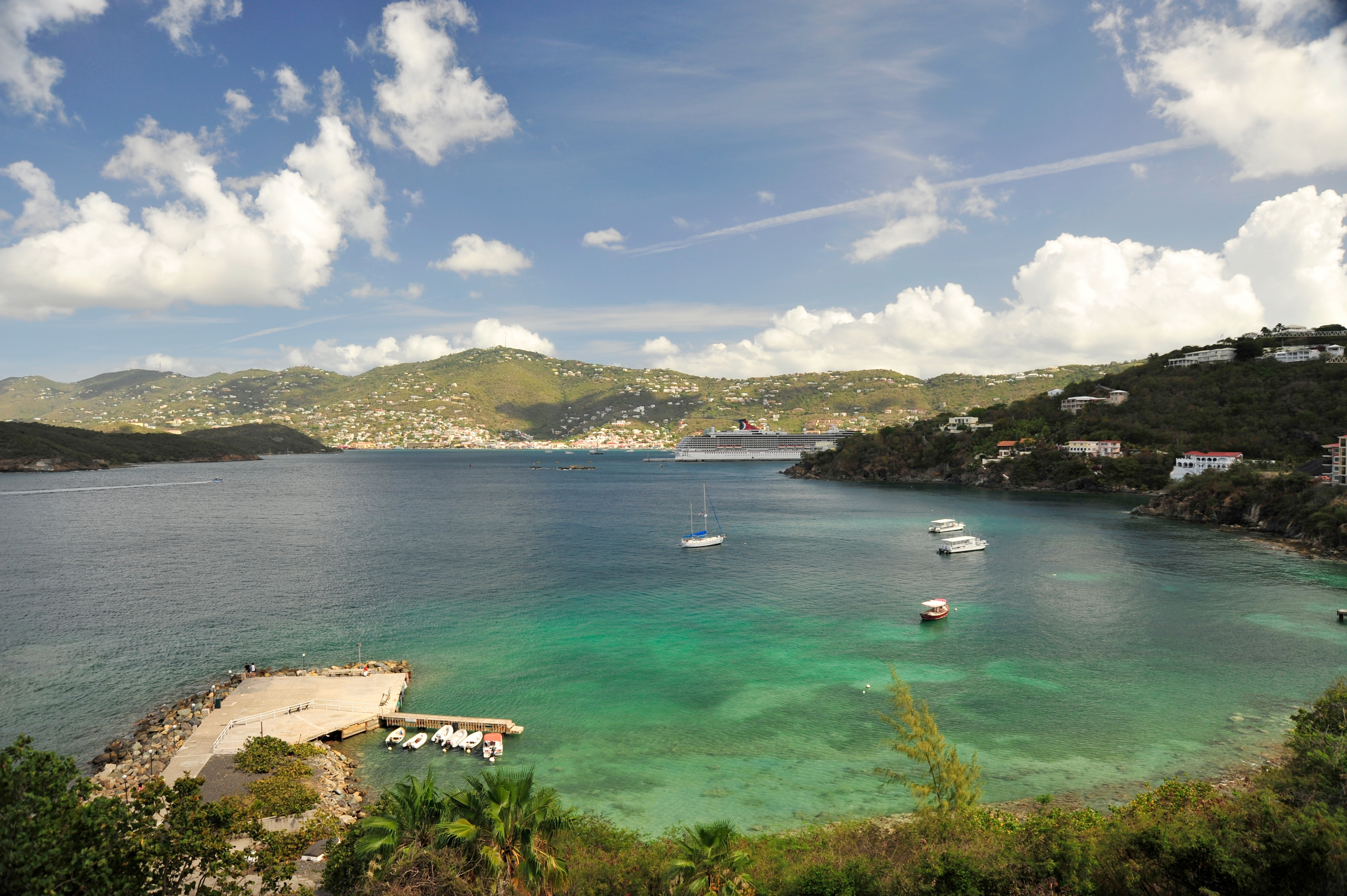
Wharf by Marriott/Pacquereau Bay on Saint Thomas

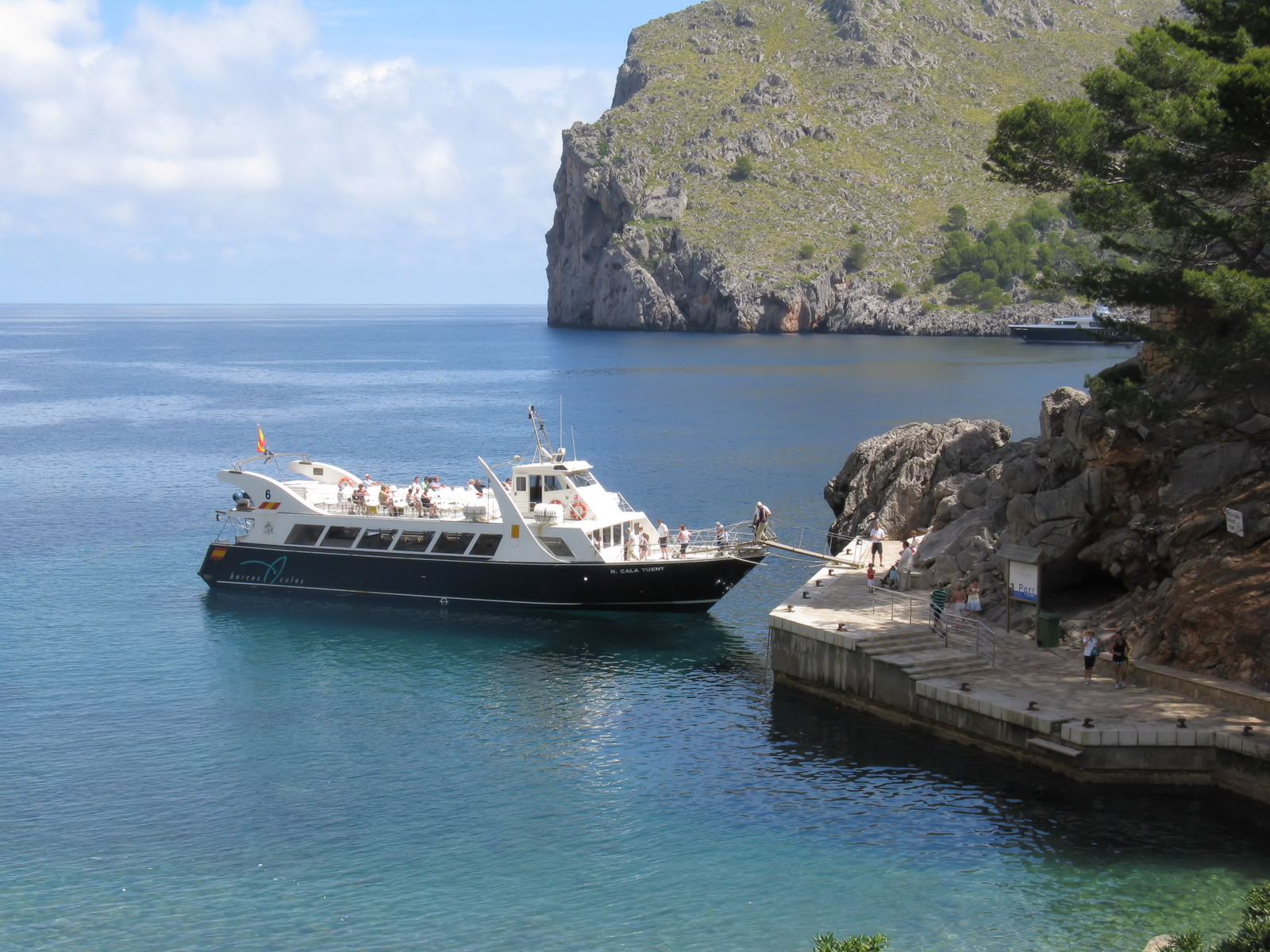
Tourist boat loading passengers at a small quay, Sa Calobra, Mallorca, Spain

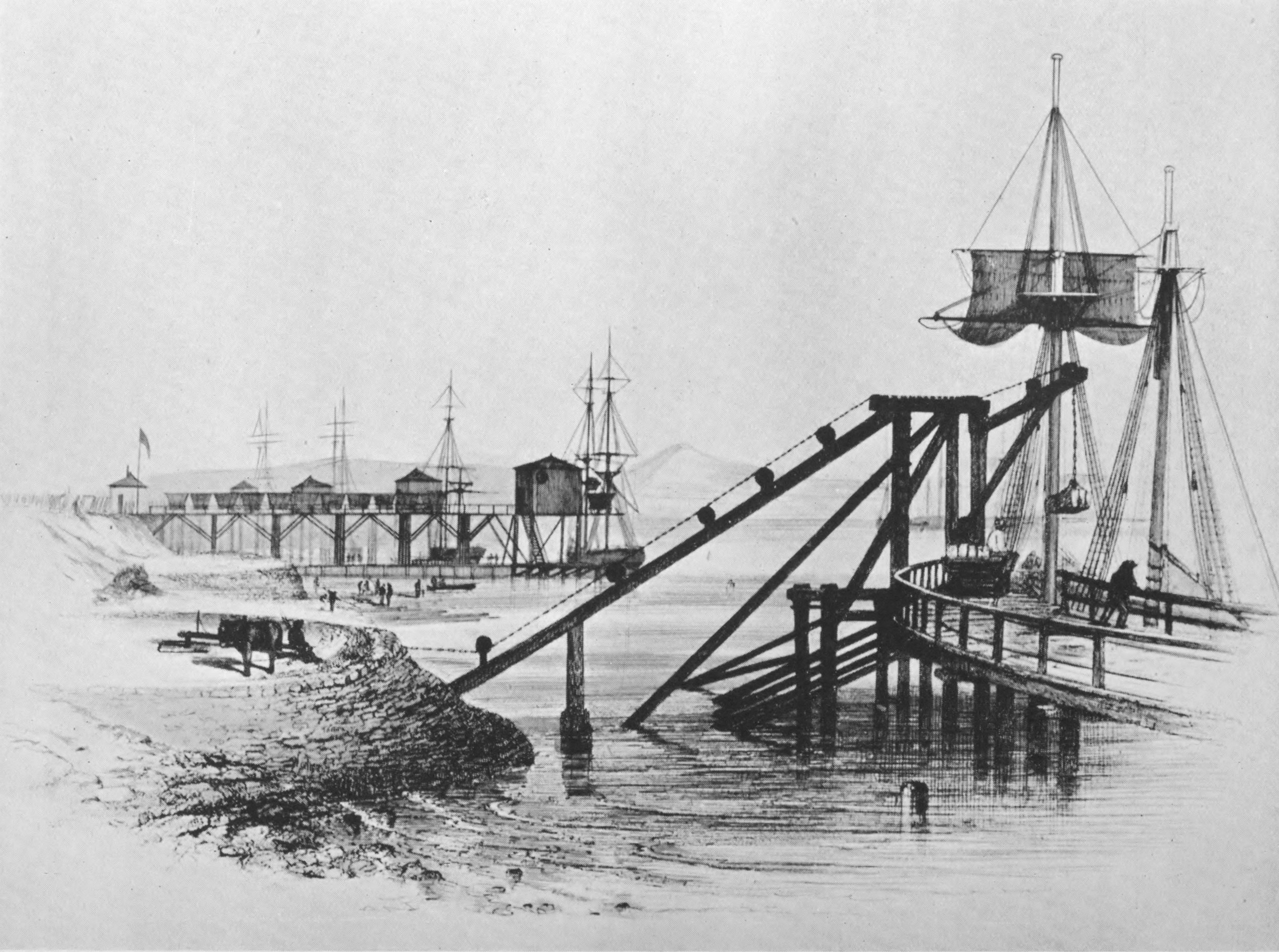
Coal drops at Port Clarence, Teesside, in 1915 (engraving by T. H. Hair)

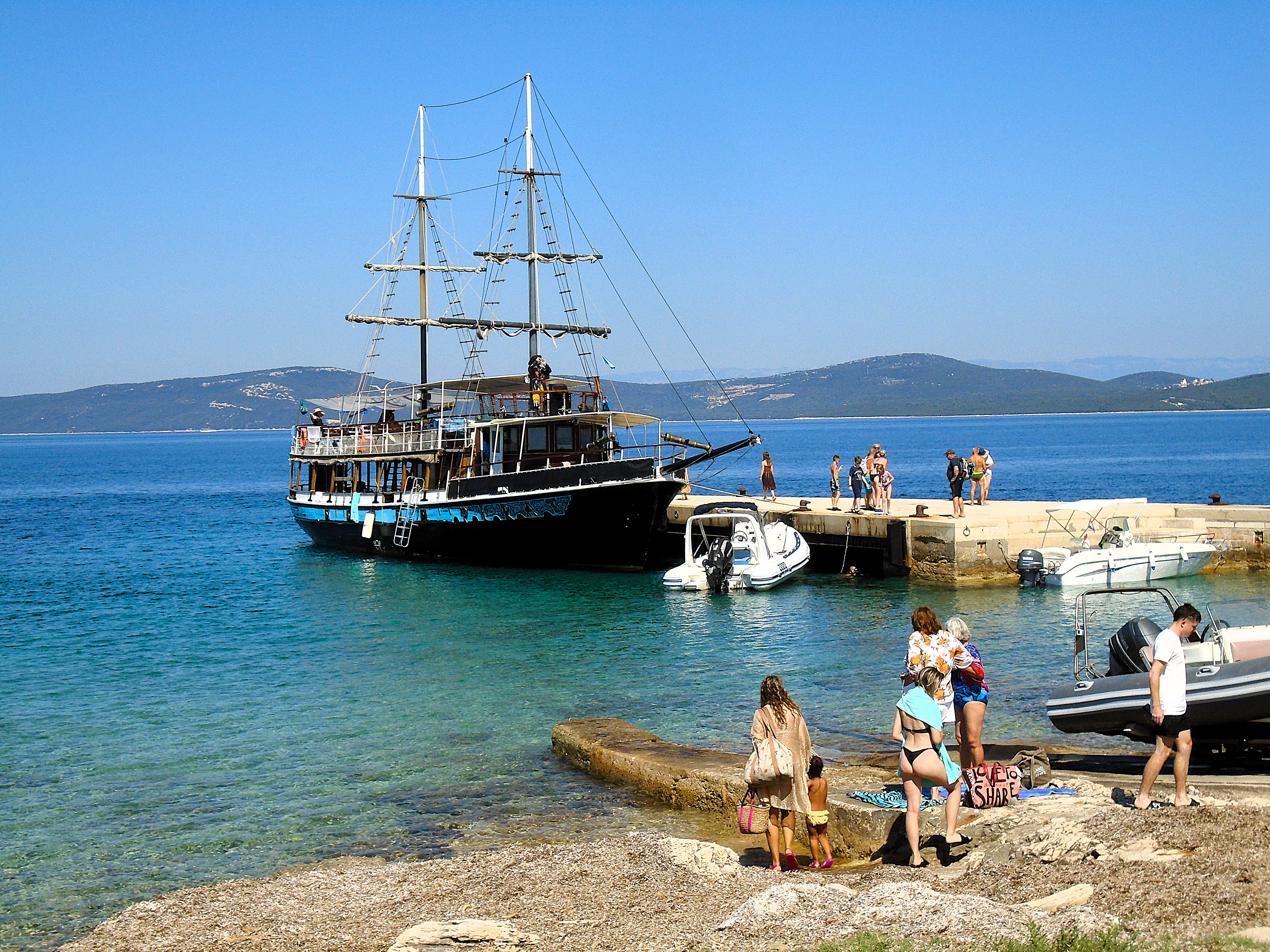
Tourist boat unloading passengers at a small quay, Vele Srakane, Croatia

== See also ==
- Bollard
- Canal basin
- Dock (maritime)
- Port
- Safeguarded wharf
