= Amagi Tunnel =

Tunnel from Mount Amagi to Shizuka, Japan

Amagi Tunnel 天城トンネル
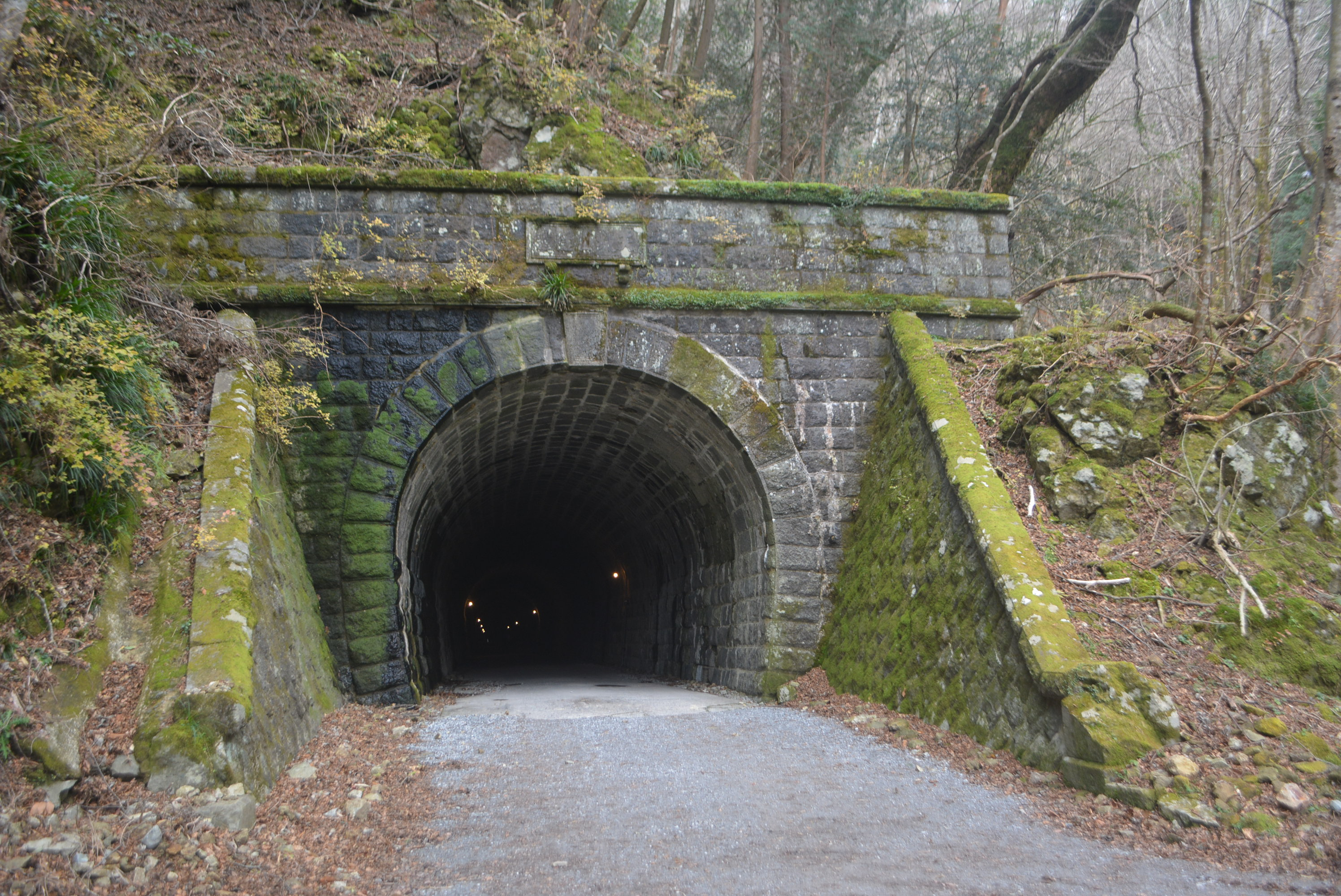
- Old Amagi Tunnel in December 2019
- Interactive map of Amagi Tunnel 天城トンネル

Overview
- Location: Shizuoka Prefecture
- Coordinates: 34°49′51″N 138°56′05″E
- Route: Japan National Route 414
- Start: Izu, Shizuoka
- End: Kawazu, Shizuoka

Technical
- Length: 445.5 metres (1,462 ft) (Amagi-san); 800 metres (2,600 ft) (new Amagi Tunnel)

The Amagi Tunnel (天城トンネル, Amagi Tonneru) is a tunnel that runs through Mount Amagi via the Japan National Route 414 from Izu to Shizuoka, Shizuoka under Amagi Pass. There are two tunnels, the Amagi-san Tunnel, which is the Old Amagi Tunnel, and the new Amagi Tunnel, also called the Shin-Amagi Tunnel.

== History ==
Amagi-san Tunnel is a tunnel that connects Izu and Kawazu under Amagi Pass. Famous for Yasunari Kawabata's novel "Izu no Odoriko" and Seicho Matsumoto's novel "Amagi Goe", this tunnel was completed in 1905 with a total length 445.5 meters. It is Japan's first stone road tunnel built entirely of cut stone, including the arch and sides, and is also the longest existing stone road tunnel in Japan.

The new Amagi Tunnel is a tunnel built parallel to the west side of Amagi-san Tunnel. It was completed in 1970, and is 800 m (2,600 ft) long. Initially, it was charged as the Amagi Tunnel toll road, but it became free on March 18, 2000.
