= 1978 Miyagi earthquake =

Earthquake off Japan

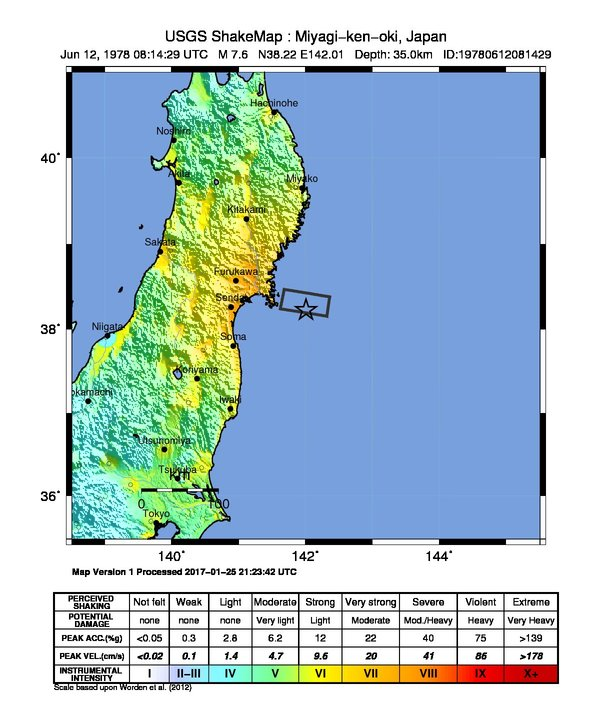

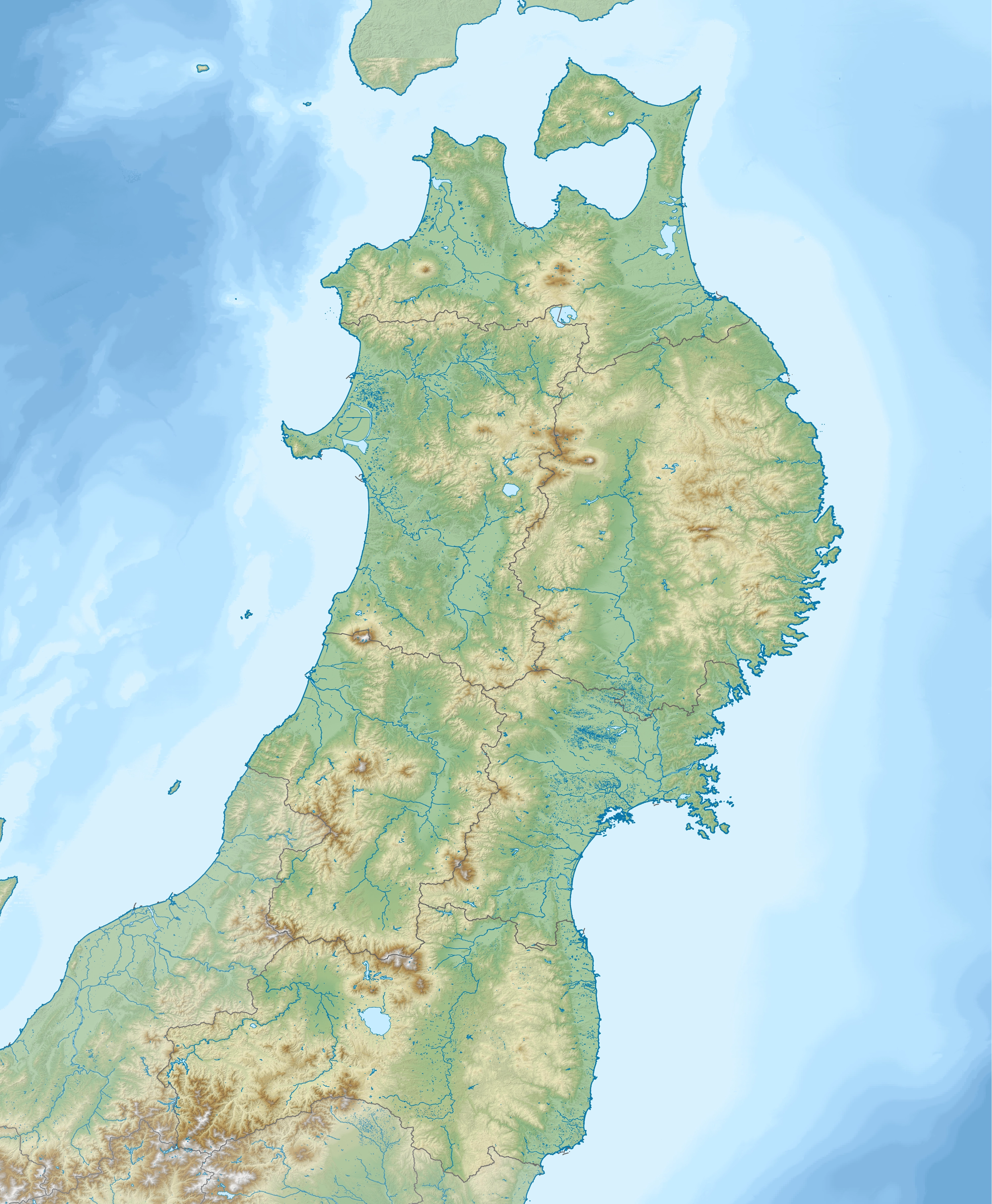
- Location within Tohoku, Japan
- UTC time: 1978-06-12 08:14:28
- ISC event: 680697
- USGS-ANSS: ComCat
- Local date: 12 June 1978
- Local time: 17:14:28
- Magnitude: M_{s} 7.7
- Depth: 44 km (27 mi)
- Epicenter: 38.19°N 142.03°E
- Type: Oblique thrust
- Areas affected: Japan, Miyagi Prefecture
- Max. intensity: JMA 5+ MMI VIII (Severe)
- Peak acceleration: 0.438 g 430 gal
- Tsunami: Yes (minor)
- Casualties: 28 dead, 1,325 injured

The 1978 Miyagi earthquake (1978年宮城県沖地震, 1978 nen Miyagi-ken-oki jishin) occurred at 17:14 local time (08:14 UTC) on 12 June. The epicentre was offshore of Miyagi Prefecture, Japan. It had a surface-wave magnitude of 7.7, JMA magnitude 7.4, and triggered a small tsunami. The earthquake reached a maximum intensity of Shindo 5 in Sendai and caused 28 deaths and 1,325 injuries.

== Geology ==
The northeastern part of Honshū lies above the subduction zone that forms the Japan Trench, where the Pacific plate is being subducted beneath the Okhotsk microplate.

The rupture of the plate interface that caused the earthquake, occurred in two distinct stages, from study of surface and body wave data and the distribution of aftershocks. The first stage of rupture propagated northwards, roughly parallel to the trench axis, along the upper of the two aftershock zones. The second stage began after about 11 seconds with a second shock, about 30 km westward of the first, at the base of the upper aftershock zone, propagating down dip. The cause of this rupture sequence is thought to be the presence of a barrier, a zone of higher strength, between the two aftershock zones.

Earthquakes with similar magnitudes have occurred in this region periodically, about every 40 years. Such earthquakes include the ones that occurred in 1793, 1835, 1861, 1897, 1936, and 1978. The 2005 Miyagi earthquake is not considered to be the one that was expected to follow the 1978 Miyagi earthquake. More recent comparisons have confirmed the differences between the 1978 and 2005 events but called into question whether this sequence truly represents the repeat of a characteristic earthquake.

The rupture zone of the 1978 earthquake occurred at the westernmost limit of known interplate earthquakes, some 150 km back from the trench. This deepest part of the rupture zone, about 40 km, is interpreted to represent the depth of transition to aseismic creep on the plate interface.

The maximum peak ground acceleration recorded was 0.125g.

There was a foreshock of magnitude M_{j} 5.8 at 17:06 local time, minutes before the main shock.

== Damage ==
There were widespread landslides that caused extensive damage to highways and one death in the area around Sendai. 1,183 houses were completely destroyed within Miyagi Prefecture, with a further 5,574 partially destroyed. Soil liquefaction was observed in lands claimed by embankment. No damage was reported from the tsunami.

== Tsunami ==
A maximum wave height of about 60 cm (24 in) was recorded at Kesennuma and Onagawa, close to the epicenter.

== Aftermath ==
The extent of damage to buildings caused by the earthquake, led directly to a revision of the Japanese Building Standard Act in 1981. The earthquake also led to a major revision in the Earthquake Insurance System, which had been set up by the Japanese government in 1966.

== 2011 Tōhoku earthquake and tsunami ==
As of March 2011 it is not known if the 2011 Tōhoku earthquake and tsunami is related to the 1978 Miyagi quake periodic sequence. Some involved geological research will be required to see if there is a relationship between the quake events.

Notable linkages

- The time difference between the quakes is 33 years – a number that is within the probability for being related to the 1978 Miyagi quake sequence.
- There are some suggestions that the 2011 Tōhoku quake is part of a 1000-year sequence (that is not related to the 40-year Miyagi quake sequence) as a similar quake and tsunami hit the Sendai coast in 869 AD.

== See also ==
- List of earthquakes in 1978
- List of earthquakes in Japan
- Miyagi earthquake – list of other earthquakes named after Miyagi
