= Spiral bridge =

Type of bridge

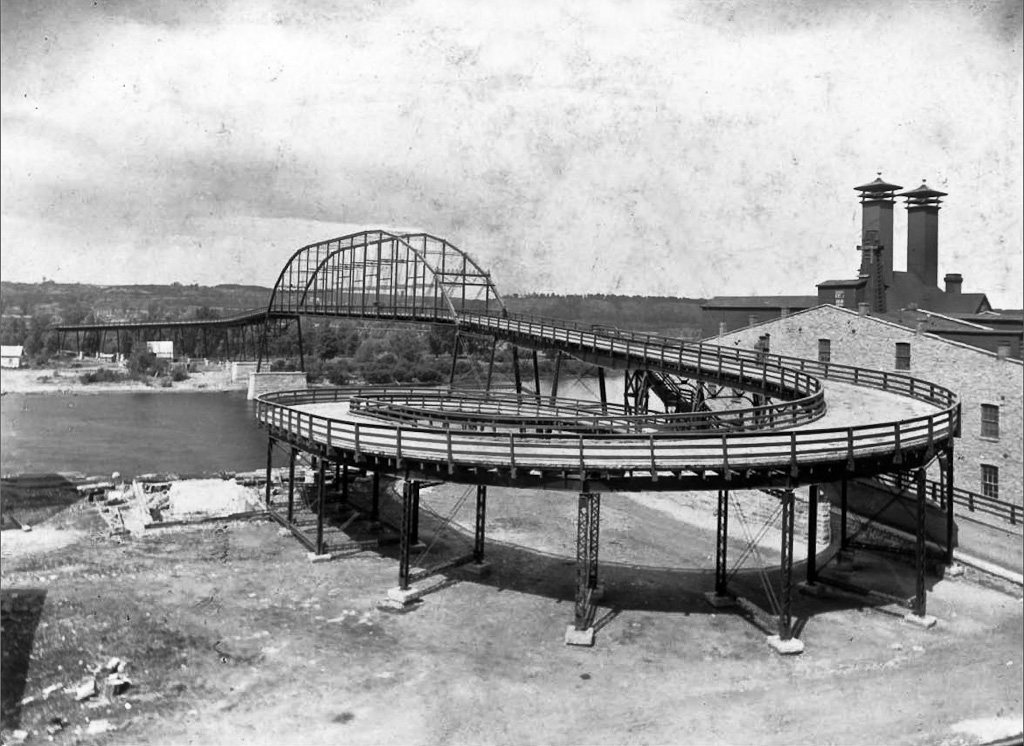
Hastings Spiral Bridge, 1895

A spiral bridge, loop bridge, helix bridge, or pigtail bridge is a road bridge which loops over its own road, allowing the road to climb rapidly. This is useful in steep terrain, or where the approach road to a bridge would terminate too far from the bridge's end. Despite its name, the typical shape of a spiral bridge forms a helix, not a spiral.

Many multi-storey car parks feature such a design as this.

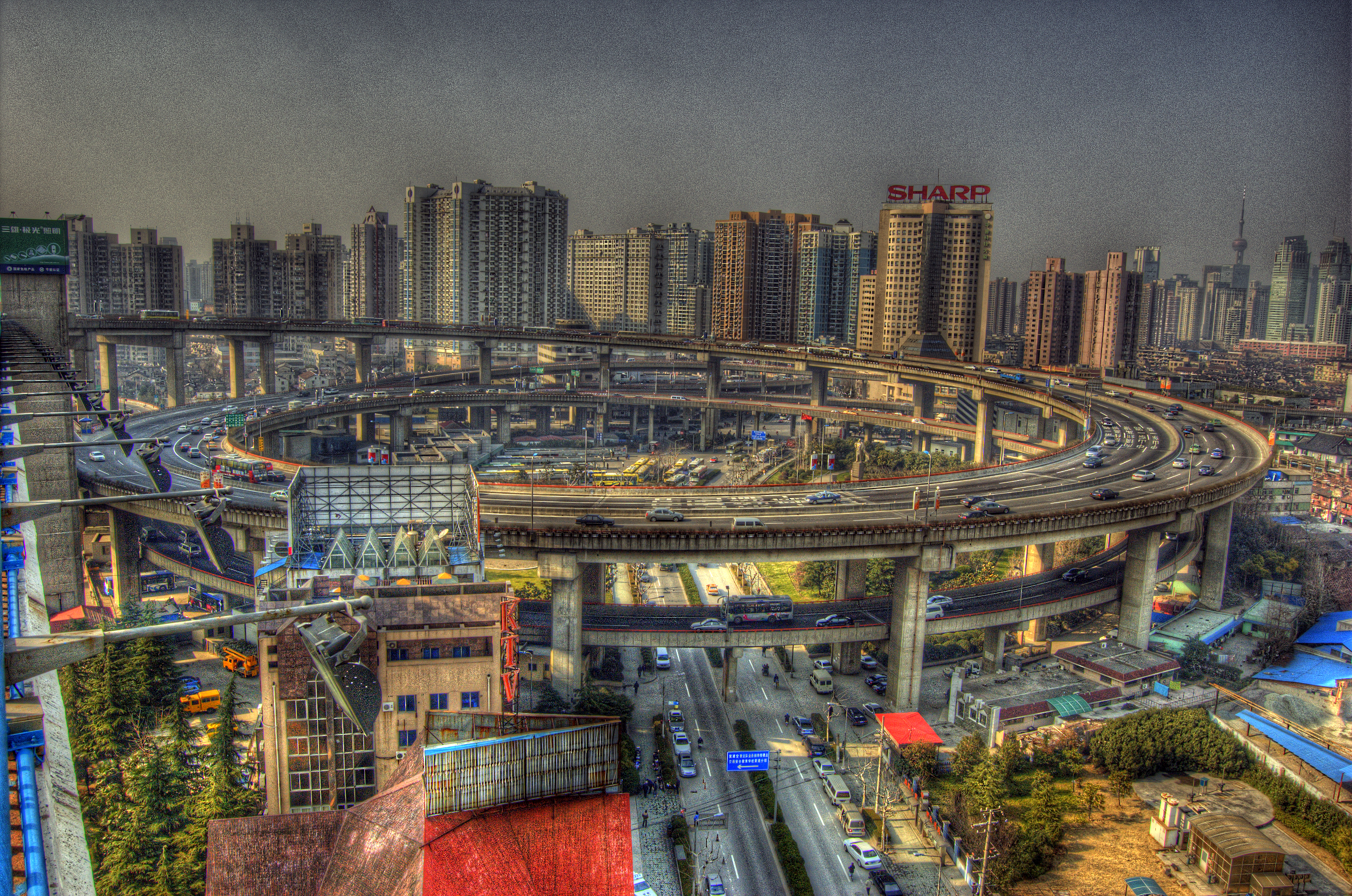
Spiral ramp to Nanpu Bridge in Shanghai, China

== Pigtail bridge ==
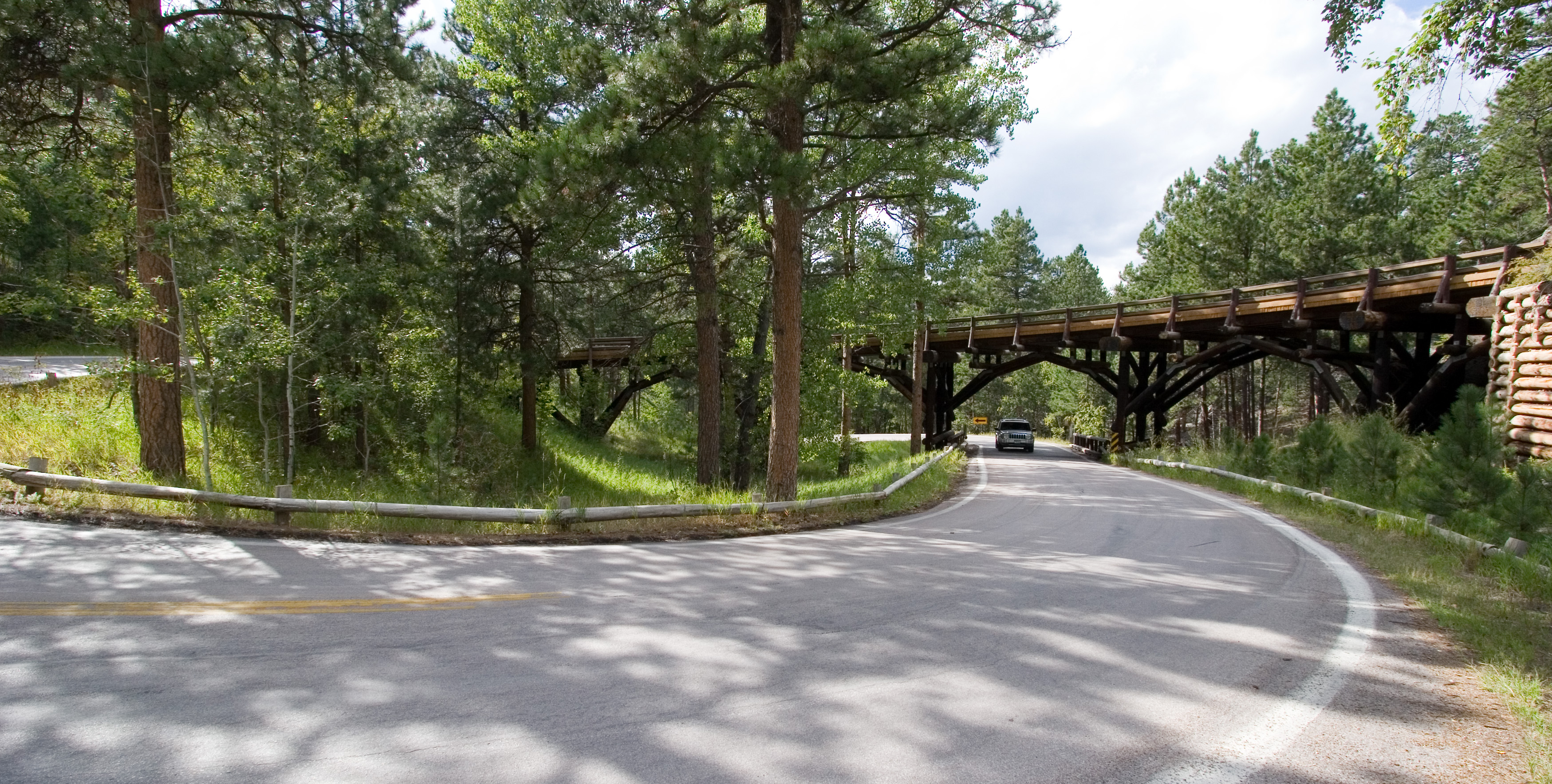
A pigtail bridge on Iron Mountain Road

In the Black Hills of South Dakota, a particular form of spiral bridge, locally called a 'pigtail bridge', was introduced in 1932 by Cecil Clyde Gideon, the self-taught superintendent of Custer State Park turned highway designer. He called them "spiral-jumpoffs". During the planning for Iron Mountain Road, there was a need to negotiate sudden elevation drops while preserving natural features for this scenic highway; the corkscrew design allowed for a spectacular—albeit expensive—solution to this problem. In order to blend the bridges with their surroundings, natural materials such as local timber were used.

Most pigtail bridges were built by the Civilian Conservation Corps in the 1930s.

== List of spiral road bridges ==
Name	Location	Year	Comment
A-7000 (previously C-345)	Málaga–Colmenar road, Spain		2 spiral tunnels at 36.775796°N 4.379339°W
A6 Highway	Italy		44.320409°N 8.377118°E
Antirio to Lamia highway (E65)	Greece		on the climb of Mount Parnassos to Delphi, Greece. 270° spiral using an overpass.
Astoria–Megler Bridge south approach (U.S. Route 101)	Astoria, United States		Western terminus of US 30, a cross-country route from Atlantic City, New Jersey 46.187590°N 123.853260°W
Cahill Expressway	Sydney, Australia		Spiral turns left in order to turn right.
Caiyuanba Bridge South Approach	Chongqing, China		29.5360605°N 106.551513°E
Canal Road Flyover	Victoria City, Hong Kong		22.2816003°N 114.1800447°E
Corkscrew Bridge, Old East Entrance Road, Yellowstone National Park (abandoned)	Wyoming, United States	1904, 1919	44.460000°N 110.117500°W
Eastern Harbour Crossing	Victoria City, Hong Kong		22.2886114°N 114.2126683°E
G329 South Bridge Approach	Shaoxing, China		30.0218999°N 120.7308062°E
G4011 Runyang Yangtze River Bridge Shiye Exit	Zhenjiang, China		32.2201231°N 119.3682047°E
General Artigas Bridge	Uruguay and Argentina		From Colón, Entre Ríos, Argentina, to Paysandú, Uruguay, across the Uruguay River. Cantilever bridge with a spiral on the Uruguay side. 32.265407°S 58.093289°W
Huanggang Port Approach	Shenzhen, China		
Isenfluh	Bern, Switzerland		Loop entirely inside a 1.2 km tunnel 46.619905°N 7.898088°E
Jialing Jiahua Bridge Approach	Chongqing, China		29.5606004°N 106.5174331°E
Jinchang Road Bridge	Wuxi, China		Double loop bridge on each approach 31.556633°N 120.330889°E
Kawazu-Nanadaru Loop Bridge	Kawazu, Japan	1981	Double loop bridge. 34.791°N 138.938°E
Lincoln Tunnel Helix (New Jersey Route 495).	Weehawken, United States		40.767037°N 74.021383°W
Mizukami Loop Bridge	Mizukami, Kumamoto, Japan		32.315°N 131.01°E
N8 Bypass Brienzwiler	Switzerland		46.750521°N 8.108833°E
Nanpu Bridge Puxi Approach	Puxi, Shanghai, China	2004	31.208094°N 121.501765°E
Nansha Bridge Hai'ou Exit	Guangzhou, China		Interchange made of ramps from spiraling up to the Nansha Bridge. 22.889226°N 113.543465°E
New Clear Water Bay Road	New Kowloon, Hong Kong		22.331717°N 114.224617°E
Prefectural Road 53 Onawaba Bridge east approach	Gifu, Japan		35.423410°N 136.744817°E
Rongqiao Road Spiral Bridge	Chongqing, China		Triple Loop Bridge 29.5262731°N 106.5449174°E
Route de Cilaos	Réunion		21.181180°S 55.454704°E
S232 Bridge South Approach	Changzhou, China		31.715834°N 120.068168°E
Sa Calobra	Mallorca, Spain		39.831968°N 2.81574°E
Sembon Matsu Bridge Approaches	Osaka, Japan		Double loop bridge on each approach 34.6324803°N 135.4759645°E
Shinkizugawao Bridge North Approach	Osaka, Japan		The road turns 1180° (3.27 revolutions) (955° on the bridge deck + 180° on the abutment) 34.628474°N 135.463726°E
South Dakota Highway 87 in Wind Cave National Park	South Dakota, United States	1930s	43.601215°N 103.494340°W
SP99 just north of Bolzano	Italy		Two loops. One, involving a tunnel, is named Schneckentunnel, German for snail tunnel 46.510391°N 11.328084°E 46.512665°N 11.343147°E
Steinmen Crossing on Oregon Highway 273, part of Historical U.S. Highway 99 through the Siskiyou Mountains	Oregon, United States		42.092091°N 122.589541°W
Tianmen Shan Big Gate Road, Tianmen Mountain National Park (2 bridges)	Hunan, China		29.05424°N 110.48344°E; 29.06547°N 110.48211°E
Tianxingzhou Yangtze River Bridge Tianxingzhou Exit	Wuhan, China		30.674541°N 114.387798°E
Thames Tunnel (planned, not constructed)	England	1825–1843	Originally planned to have an underground spiral giving access to road traffic, but this was never built.
The Loop Over Bridge, on U.S. Route 441 between Gatlinburg, Tennessee, and Cherokee, North Carolina, at Bearpen Hollow in the Great Smoky Mountains National Park	Tennessee, United States		35.635036°N 83.466047°W
Three bridges on Iron Mountain Road/U.S. Route 16A	South Dakota, United States	1930s	Known locally as "pigtail bridges" From south to north: 43.861849°N 103.437623°W; 43.869383°N 103.435572°W; 43.874979°N 103.439530°W
U.S. Route 61 across Spiral Bridge at Hastings High Bridge	Hastings, United States	1895-1951	former location: Approximately 44.745137°N 92.853034°W
Weidun Road Bridge	Changzhou, China		31.722803°N 120.059752°E
Wiadukt Stanisława Markiewicza	Warsaw, Poland	1904	In Ulica Karowa which connects Krakowskie Przedmiescie to river level,
Yanbai Yellow River Bridge North Approach	Lanzhou, China		36.0789724°N 103.8814573°E
Yurikamome approach to Rainbow Bridge	Tokyo, Japan		From the mainland. 35.636712°N 139.756192°E
Zhoutouju Tunnel Approach	Guangzhou, China		23.0985181°N 113.2520531°E
Zuidweg Bridge	Zoetermeer, Netherlands		52.047468°N 4.475218°E
Lanhai Expressway descent	Lanzhou, China	2023	35.95°N 103.75°E
Hoàng Văn Thụ Bridge	Haiphong, Vietnam	2019	20°51′58.6″N 106°40′52.8″E

== Spiral bicycle bridges ==
- The bridge over the mainline and narrow-gauge railways just west of Wernigerode Hauptbahnhof station in the Harz, Germany has a spiral at each end

== Spiral pedestrian bridges ==
- 1998–2004, Glass Spiral Bridge, Millennium Place, Coventry, England

== Turnover bridges ==
Turnover bridges were a feature of some early British canals such as the Macclesfield. The boats were pulled by a horse, and in locations where the towpath crossed to the opposite bank, the spiral on one side allowed the horse to continue without detaching the tow rope. They were not universally provided as they were more expensive to build, needing to span both the canal and the towpath.

== See also ==
- Hairpin turn
- Spiral (railway)
