= 1978 Tabas earthquake =

7.4 Mw earthquake in east-central Iran

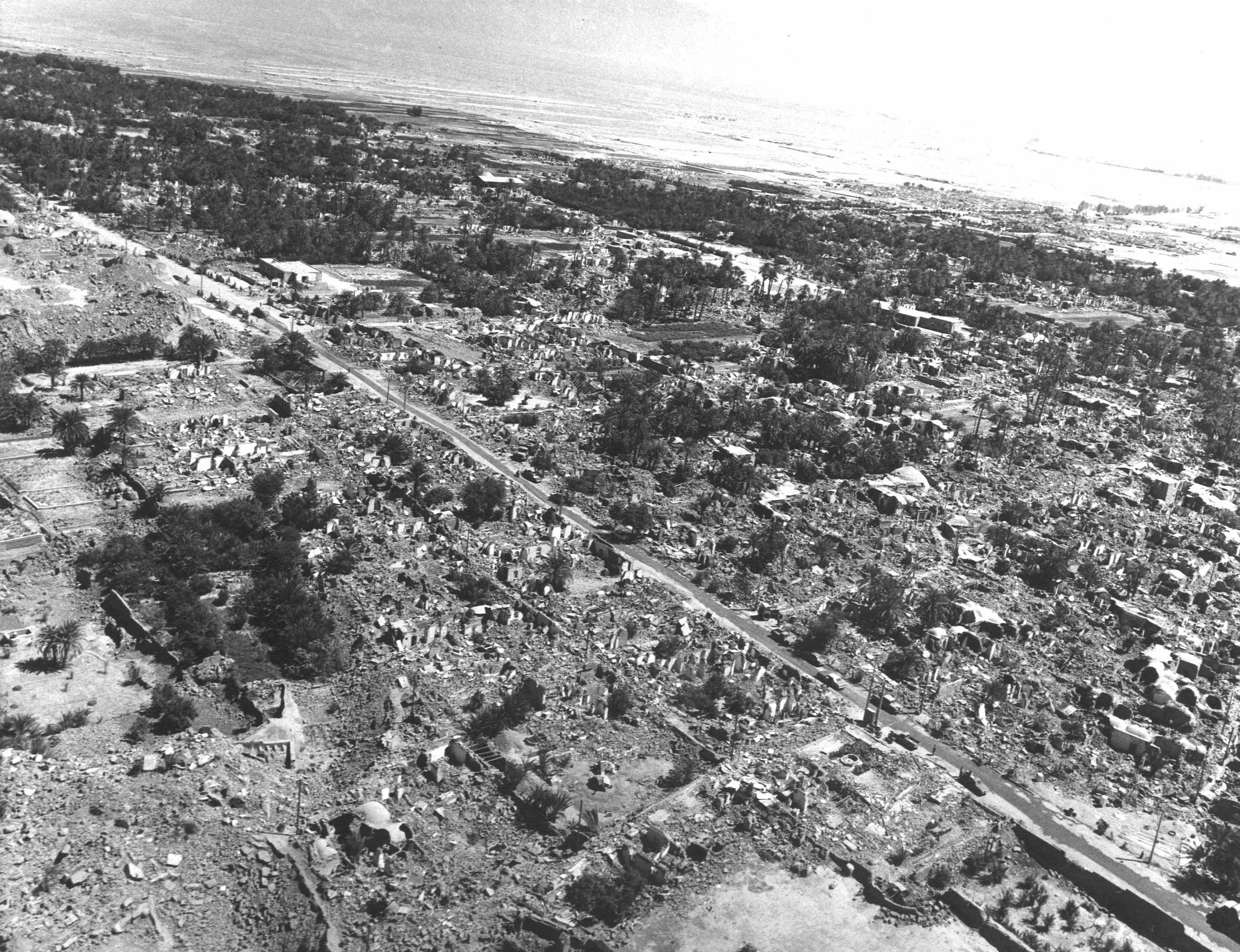
- View of Tabas following the quake

- UTC time: 1978-09-16 15:35:55
- ISC event: 676813
- USGS-ANSS: ComCat
- Local date: September 16, 1978
- Local time: 19:05:55 IRST
- Magnitude: 7.4 M_{w}
- Depth: 10 km (6.2 mi)
- Epicenter: 33.21°N 57.48°E
- Type: Thrust
- Areas affected: Iran
- Total damage: $11 million
- Max. intensity: MMI IX (Violent)
- Peak acceleration: 0.8 g
- Aftershocks: ~6,000 shocks recorded 1,560 located 5.0 mb Sept 17, 1978; 5.3 mb Dec 6, 1978; 5.1 mb Jan 17, 1979; 5.2 mb Sept 5, 1979; 5.9 mb Jan 12, 1980
- Casualties: 15,000–25,000 dead

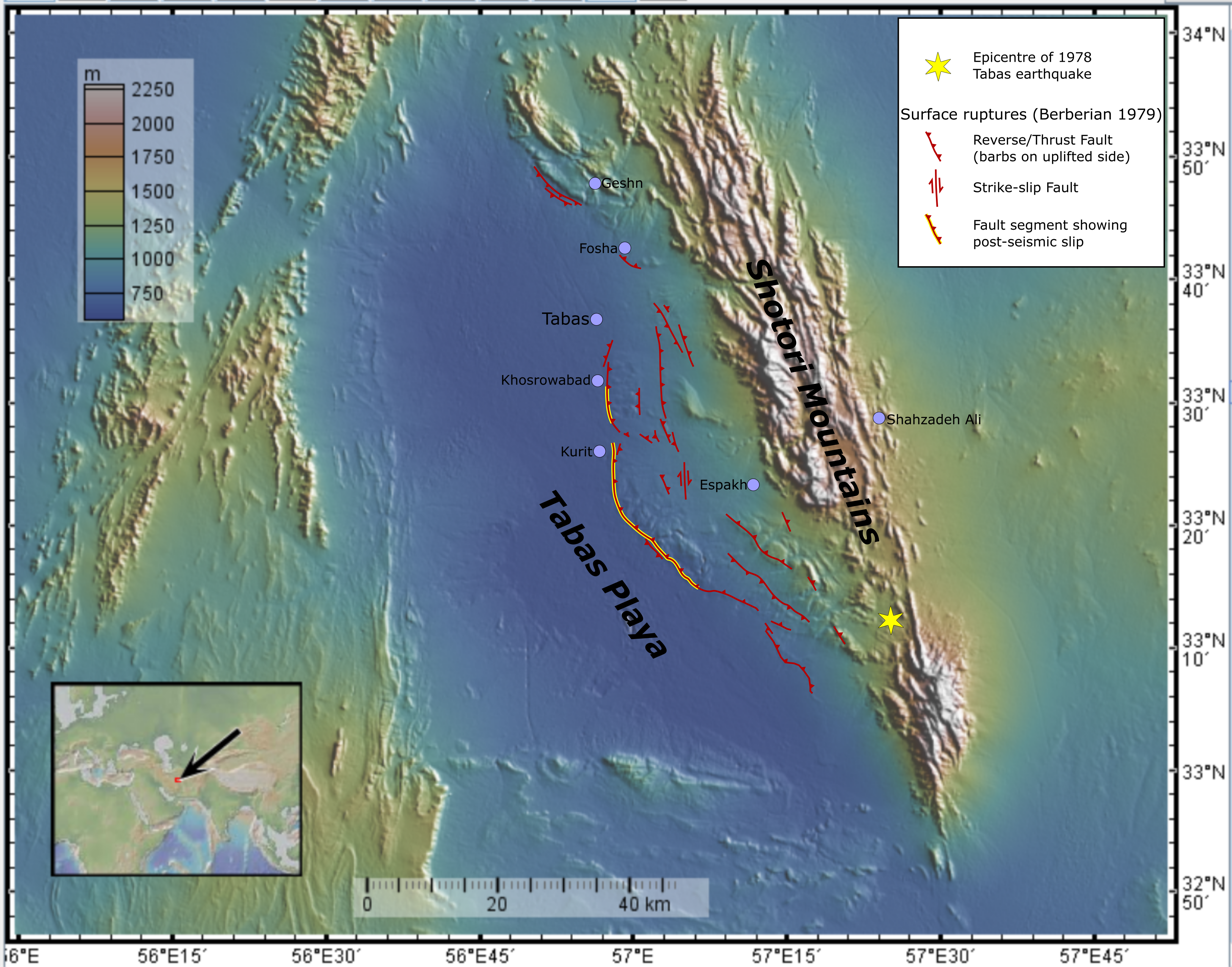
Topographic map of the epicentral area showing location of epicenter, mapped surface ruptures and observed post-seismic slip

The 1978 Tabas earthquake (Persian: زمین‌لرزه ۱۳۵۷ طبس) occurred on September 16 at 19:05:55 local time in central Iran. The shock measured 7.4 on the moment magnitude scale and had a maximum Mercalli intensity of IX+ (Violent). The death toll was in the range of 15,000–25,000, with severe damage occurring in the town of Tabas.

== Tectonic setting ==
Iran is one of the most seismically active countries in the world, being crossed by several major faults that cover at least 90% of the country. The Iranian plateau is confined by the Turan platform in the north and the Zagros fold and thrust belt and Makran Trench in the south. The Arabian plate is converging to the north with the Eurasian plate at a rate of 35 millimeters (1.4 in) per year, and is diffused across a 1,000 km (620 mi) zone resulting in continental shortening and thickening throughout the plateau, with strike-slip and reverse faulting present, as well as subduction at the Makran coast.

In eastern Iran, the shortening is accommodated by a combination of relatively short northwest–southeast trending reverse faults, long north–south trending right lateral strike-slip faults and shorter west–east trending left-lateral strike-slip faults. Eastern Iran can experience large and deadly earthquakes from both strike-slip and reverse faults in the area. The region that the 1978 earthquake occurred in had been seismically quiet for the last 11 centuries. The earthquake occurred on a blind thrust fault with a significant component of right-lateral slip. Multiple smaller earthquakes in the 20th century seemed to indicate a NNW-SSE trend along the Tabas fault, which may be a precursor to the 1978 rupture.

== Earthquake and aftershocks ==
The main earthquake occurred at 15:35 UTC on September 16, 1978. It was reported by survivors in Tabas that there was a loud roaring noise that began four to four and a half seconds prior to the shaking. An area of about 800 km^{2} (310 mi^{2}) experienced shaking of MMI IX or greater, while about 1,000 km^{2} (390 mi^{2}) experienced MMI VIII. Thousands of aftershocks were recorded, with over 40 of them a mb 4.0 or greater, with five being mb 5.0 or greater. The largest aftershock, measuring mb 5.9, hit over an year after the mainshock. Many of the larger aftershocks were preceded by a roaring noise. Reportedly, two-thirds of Iran, including the capital city of Tehran, felt the earthquake.

A field survey carried out ten days after the earthquake identified a series of surface ruptures, totalling 85 km. In all but one case the ruptures showed evidence of reverse/thrust fault movement. The maximum observed surface displacement was 35 cm, insufficient to generate the measured size of the earthquake, which indicates a minimum of 3 metres of movement. There was also evidence of bedding-plane slip, suggesting that folds, such as those to the east of the Tabas and Kurit faults, grew during the earthquake.

Further analysis has been carried out using a combination of aerial photographs, satellite images and synthetic aperture radar (SAR). These results have shown that slip on the causative fault continued for at least 40 years after the earthquake. The minimum total post-seismic slip is estimated as 4.7 m. These results, combined with the depth distribution of aftershocks, suggest that there is a low-angle detachment fault extending westward from the Shotori range front, linking to a high-angle ramp that reaches the surface.

== Damage ==
The earthquake destroyed or severely damaged around 90 villages, with a further 50 villages suffering some damage. The town of Tabas was completely destroyed. The city of Ferdows was also badly affected, with 80% of its buildings destroyed.

More than 15,000 housing units and 30 qanats (water supply systems) were destroyed, although water reservoirs were unaffected. The degree of damage to buildings was exacerbated by the predominant construction style using adobe walls with heavy roofs. Even newer buildings that had steel beam roofs still used adobe walls. The weakness of the sun-dried mud bricks caused most of this type of building to collapse, particularly where they were sited on alluvium. A few more modern buildings, such as several schools and a hospital were less badly affected than those of traditional construction.

The earthquake triggered many landslides and rockfalls on the steeper slopes in the epicentral area. The flow of water in springs and qanats was disrupted and small mud volcanoes were observed on the Tabas playa.

Manuel Berberian reported that over 20,000 people were killed, with 85% fatalities in Tabas itself (11,000 people). Some later reports give up to 26,000 deaths. The earthquake was the third-deadliest natural disaster in Iran in the last hundred years.

== Aftermath ==
Immediately after the earthquake, rescue efforts were hindered by the failure of the local power station and a lunar eclipse two hours after the earthquake mainshock. In response to the disaster, the Iranian Army dispatched four medical teams, 700 soldiers and many other rescue workers to the affected area. Damage to the qanat system meant that water had to be transported to Tabas from Mashan, 9 hours drive away.

Poor government response in the aftermath of this earthquake was a contributing factor in the Iranian revolution that was taking place at that time.

== See also ==
- List of earthquakes in 1978
- List of earthquakes in Iran
