= 1978 Oaxaca earthquake =

Earthquake in Mexico

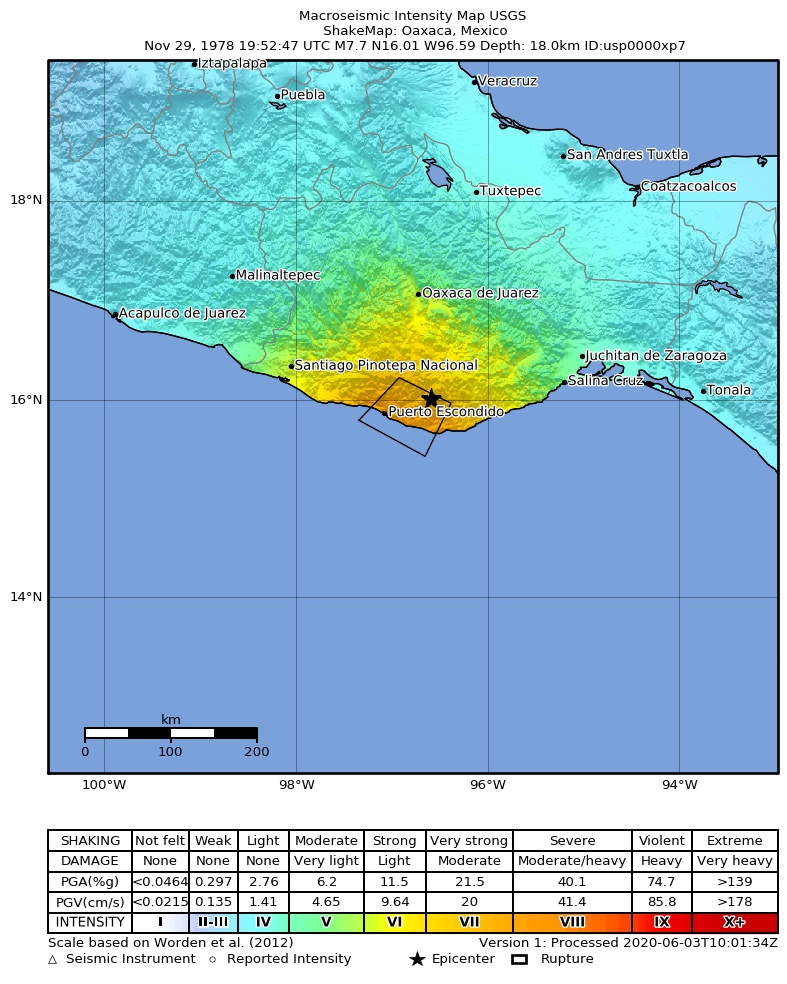

- Location within Mexico
- UTC time: 1978-11-29 19:52:47
- ISC event: 674661
- USGS-ANSS: ComCat
- Local date: 29 November 1978
- Local time: 11:52 PST
- Duration: 1.5–2 minutes
- Magnitude: 7.8 M_{w}
- Depth: 18.0 km (11.2 mi)
- Epicenter: 16.010°N 96.591°W
- Fault: Middle America Trench
- Type: Megathrust
- Areas affected: Oaxaca, Mexico City
- Max. intensity: MMI VIII (Severe)
- Casualties: 9 dead

On November 29, 1978, a moment magnitude 7.7–7.8 earthquake struck off the coast of the southern Mexican state Oaxaca. The thrust-faulting event caused severe damage in Oaxaca and Mexico City.

== Tectonic setting ==
Along the west coast of Mexico, the Rivera, Cocos and Nazca plate dives beneath the North American and Caribbean plate in a process known as subduction. This occurs along the Middle America Trench which runs from Mexico down to Costa Rica for over 2,750 km. The subduction zone is a large thrust fault that has produced devastating earthquakes in human history. Subduction has also resulted in volcanic activity in central Mexico.

== Earthquake ==
The earthquake ruptured an area of 5,525 km^{3} along with the boundary interface of the Cocos and North American plates. That particular segment has not produced any large earthquakes since 1928 and 1931 and thus considered a seismic gap. A major earthquake of magnitude 7.5 ± 2.5 was forecasted at that area in 1973. The earthquake ruptured about 80 percent of the segment designated a seismic gap and produced slip of 1.48 m (4 ft 10 in).

This earthquake is well known as one out of the two earthquakes that forecasted in advance in the West. The other was the 5.9 magnitude 1975 Oroville earthquake in California, both due to irregular seismic activities in the area before the main shock.

== Impact ==
Nine people were killed, eight of those were from Mexico City and one death occurred in Oaxaca. A few buildings in Mexico City had minor damage; this was contrary to the numerous newspaper reports that many buildings had collapsed. Eyewitness reported many buildings swaying during the earthquake. Two buildings; the Treasury Building and another owned by the Bank of Mexico suffered considerable damage to their exterior. A further 100 people were injured. Falling glass and collapsing walls injured 50 people. Electricity services were cut in some areas causing major traffic jams. Damage inspections by professionals led many buildings in Mexico City to close.

== See also ==
- List of earthquakes in 1978
- List of earthquakes in Mexico
