= 1978 Santa Barbara earthquake =

Earthquake in California, United States

1978 Santa Barbara (Goleta) earthquake
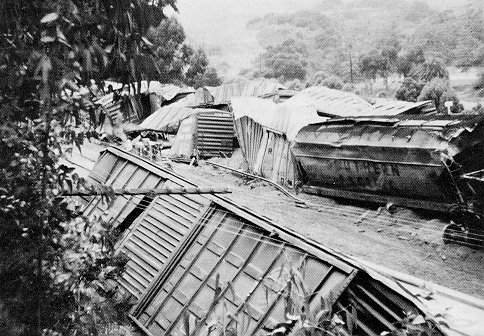
- The derailment of a freight train, caused by the earthquake

- Location within California
- UTC time: 1978-08-13 22:54:52
- ISC event: 677997
- USGS-ANSS: ComCat
- Local date: August 13, 1978
- Local time: 15:54:52 PDT
- Magnitude: 5.1 M_{L} 5.6 M_{w}
- Depth: 8.8 km (5.5 mi)
- Epicenter: 34.18°N 118.25°W
- Fault: unknown
- Type: Thrust
- Total damage: $15 million (1978 rate) in damages
- Max. intensity: MMI VII (Very strong)
- Peak acceleration: 0.23−0.94 g
- Casualties: 65 injuries

The 1978 Santa Barbara earthquake (also known as the Goleta earthquake), occurred on August 13, 1978, 3:54 p.m. (PDT) with its epicenter beneath the Santa Barbara Channel. The magnitude of the earthquake was estimated at M_{L} 5.1 according to the Southern California Seismic Network; however, it may have been as high as 5.6 M_{w}. There were no deaths from the event; however, 65 people sustained mild to moderate injuries.

== Tectonic setting ==
Santa Barbara is part of California, which is known for its very high level of seismic activity, the second highest in all of the United States only behind Alaska. The Santa Barbara area is affected by numerous faults, inland within the mountainous ridges on the Santa Ynez Range down to the coastal plains and beneath the Santa Barbara Channel. The Santa Barbara Channel lies within the Transverse Ranges block where the transform boundary between the North American and Pacific plates takes on a transpressional character associated with the "Big Bend" in the San Andreas Fault. The faults beneath the channel trend mainly west–east and are mainly thrusts with associated folding. Santa Barbara was previously hit by a much larger earthquake in 1925, with estimated magnitude between 6.5 and 6.8 M_{w}, causing $8 million (1925 rate) in damage and killing 13 people.

== Earthquake ==
According to initial records it measured 5.1–5.7 M_{L} and is still being debated today. The fault that caused the tremor has still been unidentified however surface ruptures were found facing Northwestward around the epicenter focused beneath the Santa Barbara Channel. Seismograph monitors in the campus of the University of California, Santa Barbara (UCSB) measured 0.45 g, another monitor at the top of the North hall on the other hand recorded accelerations as high as 0.94 g. Other local seismographs claim that 0.40 g was recorded in Goleta and only 0.23 g was recorded in Santa Barbara. Coincidentally, just a day before the earthquake struck, four seismographs were installed near the most affected areas. The newly installed instruments helped determine the focal mechanism; thrust faulting with a small component of left-lateral strike-slip.

== Damage ==
Despite having a relatively moderate magnitude, it generated unusually strong ground movements. The city of Goleta suffered the greatest damage due to its location nearest to the epicenter. Items were thrown out off shelves at shops, glass windows on buildings shattered, walls cracked and one roof reportedly collapsed. Rockslides were triggered, one of them blocking California State Route 154, 5 km southeast of the San Marcos Pass, forcing a closure for 30 hours. Other landslides occurred nearby the San Marcos Pass, and along south of U.S. Highway 101. The airport terminal at the Santa Barbara Municipal Airport leaned, and a nearby freight train from Goleta derailed. At the library of the UCSB, some 400,000 volumes or about one third of all books were thrown out of shelves. The total damage was at $15 million, in the UCSB it was at $5.5 million alone.

== See also ==
- List of earthquakes in 1978
- List of earthquakes in the United States
- List of earthquakes in California
