= List of earthquakes in 1978 =

Earthquakes in 1978
Approximate epicenters of the earthquakes in 1978
- 4.0–5.9 magnitude
- 6.0–6.9 magnitude
- 7.0–7.9 magnitude
- 8.0+ magnitude
- Strongest magnitude: 2 events reached magnitude 7.7.
- Deadliest: Iran, Yazd Province (Magnitude 7.4) September 16 20,000 deaths.
- Total fatalities: 20,220

Number by magnitude
- 9.0+: 0
- 8.0–8.9: 0
- 7.0–7.9: 12
- 6.0–6.9: 81
- 5.0–5.9: 1,535
- 4.0–4.9: 2,579

This is a list of earthquakes in 1978. Only earthquakes of magnitude 6 or above are included, unless they result in damage and/or casualties, or are notable for some other reason. Events in remote areas will not be listed but included in statistics and maps. Countries are entered on the lists in order of their status in this particular year. All dates are listed according to UTC time. Maximum intensities are indicated on the Mercalli intensity scale and are sourced from United States Geological Survey (USGS) ShakeMap data. Another fairly quiet year as far as earthquakes above magnitude 7.0. The largest of the 12 events in this threshold were magnitude 7.7 and both Japan and Mexico experienced these. The Kuril Islands in Russia had a robust series of large earthquakes in March. Iran dominated the death toll for the year. One event in September left 20,000 dead. Japan had two destructive events including the joint largest event of the year. October had no events above magnitude 6 which is an unusual quiescence.

== By death toll ==
Rank	Death toll	Magnitude	Location	MMI	Depth (km)	Date
1	20,000	7.4	Iran, Yazd Province	IX (Violent)	33.0	September 16
2	76	6.2	Iran, Khuzestan Province	VII (Very strong)	33.0	December 14
3	50	6.4	Greece, East Macedonia and Thrace	IX (Violent)	3.0	June 20
4	29	6.6	Japan, off the south coast of Honshu	IX (Violent)	14.0	January 14
5	28	7.7	Japan, off the east coast of Honshu	VIII (Severe)	44.0	June 12
6	17	4.9	Guatemala, Chimaltenango Department	VI (Strong)	10.0	July 29

Listed are earthquakes with at least 10 dead.

== By magnitude ==
Rank	Magnitude	Death toll	Location	MMI	Depth (km)	Date
= 1	7.7	28	Japan, off the east coast of Honshu	VIII (Severe)	44.0	June 12
= 1	7.7	9	Mexico, Oaxaca	IX (Violent)	18.0	November 29
2	7.6	0	Soviet Union, Kuril Islands, Russia	VI (Strong)	33.0	March 24
3	7.5	0	Soviet Union, Kuril Islands, Russia	VIII (Severe)	33.0	March 23
= 4	7.4	0	Taiwan, off the southeast coast	VI (Strong)	17.0	July 23
= 4	7.4	20,000	Iran, Yazd Province	IX (Violent)	33.0	September 16
5	7.2	0	New Zealand, Kermadec Islands	( )	33.0	February 9
= 6	7.1	0	Soviet Union, Issyk-Kul Region, Kyrgyzstan	VIII (Severe)	33.0	March 24
= 6	7.1	0	Solomon Islands	VII (Very strong)	33.0	November 5
= 7	7.0	0	Tonga	( )	33.0	June 17
= 7	7.0	0	Costa Rica, Guanacaste Province	VIII (Severe)	56.0	August 23
= 7	7.0	2	Taiwan, off the east coast	VI (Strong)	33.0	December 23

Listed are earthquakes with at least 7.0 magnitude.

== By month ==
=== January ===
January
- Strongest magnitude: 6.6 M_{w} Japan
- Deadliest: 6.6 M_{w} Japan; 29 deaths
- Total fatalities: 29

Number by magnitude
- 8.0–8.9: 0
- 7.0–7.9: 0
- 6.0–6.9: 7
- 5.0–5.9: 142
- 4.0–4.9: 182

Date	Country and location	M_{w}	Depth (km)	MMI	Notes	Casualties	
Date	Country and location	M_{w}	Depth (km)	MMI	Notes	Dead	Injured
6	Philippines, north of Luzon	6.1	33.0	VI			
13	Soviet Union, Kuril Islands	6.0	33.0				
14	Japan, off the south coast of Honshu	6.7	14.0	IX	Main article: 1978 Izu Ōshima earthquake	29	129
14	New Zealand, Kermadec Islands	6.3	22.0				
15	New Zealand, Kermadec Islands	6.2	20.0				
17	Argentina, San Juan	6.0	19.5	VI			
24	Soviet Union, Kuril Islands	6.0	39.2				
24	Papua New Guinea, West New Britain Province	6.1	79.5	V			
25	Papua New Guinea, East New Britain Province	6.6	44.0	VI			
28	Fiji, offshore	6.4	106.3				
29	Papua New Guinea, New Ireland	6.0	15.0				

=== February ===
February
- Strongest magnitude: 7.2 M_{w} New Zealand
- Total fatalities: 0

Number by magnitude
- 8.0–8.9: 0
- 7.0–7.9: 1
- 6.0–6.9: 6
- 5.0–5.9: 139
- 4.0–4.9: 171

Date	Country and location	M_{w}	Depth (km)	MMI	Notes	Casualties	
Date	Country and location	M_{w}	Depth (km)	MMI	Notes	Dead	Injured
9	New Zealand, Kermadec Islands	7.2	33.0				
11	New Zealand, Kermadec Islands	6.6	33.0		Aftershock.		
15	Turkey, Erzincan Province	4.8	33.0	IV	20 people were injured and 525 homes were destroyed.		20
20	Japan, off the east coast of Honshu	6.1	60.0	VIII	30 people were hurt and some damage was caused.		30

=== March ===
March
- Strongest magnitude: 7.6 M_{w} Soviet Union
- Deadliest: 5.6 M_{w} Italy; 2 deaths
- Total fatalities: 4

Number by magnitude
- 8.0–8.9: 0
- 7.0–7.9: 3
- 6.0–6.9: 15
- 5.0–5.9: 210
- 4.0–4.9: 311

Date	Country and location	M_{w}	Depth (km)	MMI	Notes	Casualties	
Date	Country and location	M_{w}	Depth (km)	MMI	Notes	Dead	Injured
3	Tonga	6.2	33.0				
4	Tonga	6.3	33.0				
4	Papua New Guinea, off the east coast of New Ireland (island)	6.2	78.0	V			
7	Japan, Izu Islands	6.9	439.0		A magnitude 6.0 foreshock occurred seconds earlier.		
11	Italy, Calabria	5.6	33.0	V	2 people died and at least 51 were injured. Some damage was reported.	2	51
16	Afghanistan, Kandahar Province	5.9	33.0	VII	1 person was killed and some damage was caused.	1	
19	Mexico, Guerrero	6.4	36.0	VII	1 person died and 25 people were injured. Some damage was caused.	1	25
22	Soviet Union, Kuril Islands, Russia	6.7	33.0	IV	Beginning of a series of large events.		
22	Soviet Union, Kuril Islands, Russia	6.6	33.0	V			
23	Soviet Union, Kuril Islands, Russia	6.8	46.0	V			
23	Soviet Union, Kuril Islands, Russia	7.5	33.0	VIII	A small tsunami was observed.		
23	Soviet Union, Kuril Islands, Russia	6.8	33.0				
24	Soviet Union, Kuril Islands, Russia	7.6	33.0	VI	A small tsunami was observed.		
24	Soviet Union, Issyk-Kul Region, Kyrgyzstan	7.1	33.0	VIII	Major damage was reported.		

=== April ===
April
- Strongest magnitude: 6.7 M_{w} Indonesia
- Deadliest: 5.7 M_{w} Italy; 5 deaths
- Total fatalities: 5

Number by magnitude
- 8.0–8.9: 0
- 7.0–7.9: 0
- 6.0–6.9: 7
- 5.0–5.9: 105
- 4.0–4.9: 230

Date	Country and location	M_{w}	Depth (km)	MMI	Notes	Casualties	
Date	Country and location	M_{w}	Depth (km)	MMI	Notes	Dead	Injured
4	China, western Xizang Province	6.0	27.0	VII			
4	Panama, north of	6.1	35.0	IV			
10	Indonesia, south of Lombok	6.7	33.0				
12	United States, south of Kodiak Island, Alaska	6.6	14.0	V			
13	Yugoslavia, Rasina District, Serbia	5.7	33.0	VI	Some damage was caused.		
15	Italy, off the north coast of Sicily	5.7	14.0	VI	5 people were killed. 400 homes were destroyed.	5	
29	Solomon Islands, Guadalcanal	6.2	46.0	V			

=== May ===
May
- Strongest magnitude: 6.8 M_{w} Japan
- Total fatalities: 0

Number by magnitude
- 8.0–8.9: 0
- 7.0–7.9: 0
- 6.0–6.9: 5
- 5.0–5.9: 133
- 4.0–4.9: 243

Date	Country and location	M_{w}	Depth (km)	MMI	Notes	Casualties	
Date	Country and location	M_{w}	Depth (km)	MMI	Notes	Dead	Injured
13	New Hebrides, Vanuatu	6.7	160.0	V			
23	Japan, off the south coast of Kyushu	6.3	161.0	V			
23	Greece, East Macedonia and Thrace	5.7	10.0	VII	2 people were injured and some damage was caused.		2
24	United States, Andreanof Islands, Alaska	6.7	25.0	IV			
26	Japan, Volcano Islands	6.8	33.0				

=== June ===
June
- Strongest magnitude: 7.7 M_{w} Japan
- Deadliest: 6.4 M_{w} Greece; 50 deaths
- Total fatalities: 78

Number by magnitude
- 8.0–8.9: 0
- 7.0–7.9: 2
- 6.0–6.9: 9
- 5.0–5.9: 98
- 4.0–4.9: 229

Date	Country and location	M_{w}	Depth (km)	MMI	Notes	Casualties	
Date	Country and location	M_{w}	Depth (km)	MMI	Notes	Dead	Injured
3	Japan, Shimane Prefecture, Honshu	4.9	19.0	IV	1 person was injured and some damage was caused.		1
4	Soviet Union, Bukhara Region, Uzbekistan	6.0	33.0	VI			
11	Tonga	6.2	33.0				
11	Canada, west of Vancouver Island	6.1	10.0				
12	Japan, off the east coast of Honshu	7.7	44.0	VIII	Largest event of 1978. The 1978 Miyagi earthquake caused 28 deaths and nearly 10,000 injuries. Property damage was extensive with costs reaching $865 million (1978 rate). A tsunami was generated.	28	10,000
14	Japan, off the east coast of Honshu	6.3	40.0	IV	Aftershock.		
14	Philippines, off the west coast of Mindanao	6.9	24.0	VII			
16	Philippines, eastern Mindanao	6.0	139.0	IV			
17	Tonga	7.0	33.0				
20	Greece, East Macedonia and Thrace	6.4	3.0	IX	The 1978 Thessaloniki earthquake resulted in 50 deaths and at least 101 injuries. Major damage was caused with costs being $250 million (1978 rate).	50	101
24	Indonesia, off the coast of southern Sumatra	6.4	33.0	V			

=== July ===
July
- Strongest magnitude: 7.4 M_{w} Taiwan
- Deadliest: 4.9 M_{w} Guatemala; 17 deaths
- Total fatalities: 17

Number by magnitude
- 8.0–8.9: 0
- 7.0–7.9: 1
- 6.0–6.9: 4
- 5.0–5.9: 112
- 4.0–4.9: 206

Date	Country and location	M_{w}	Depth (km)	MMI	Notes	Casualties	
Date	Country and location	M_{w}	Depth (km)	MMI	Notes	Dead	Injured
22	Papua New Guinea, New Ireland (island)	6.0	43.0	VI			
23	Taiwan, off the southeast coast	7.4	17.0	VI			
29	Guatemala, Chimaltenango Department	4.9	10.0	VI	17 people were killed and a further 101 were injured. Some damage was caused.	17	101

=== August ===
August
- Strongest magnitude: 7.0 M_{w} Costa Rica
- Total fatalities: 0

Number by magnitude
- 8.0–8.9: 0
- 7.0–7.9: 1
- 6.0–6.9: 6
- 5.0–5.9: 118
- 4.0–4.9: 166

Date	Country and location	M_{w}	Depth (km)	MMI	Notes	Casualties	
Date	Country and location	M_{w}	Depth (km)	MMI	Notes	Dead	Injured
3	Chile, Atacama Region	6.3	58.0	IX	13 people were hurt and major damage was caused.		13
3	Indonesia, off the north coast of West Papua (province)	6.1	33.0	V			
13	United States, Santa Barbara Channel, California	5.1	18.0	VII	65 people were injured and property damage worth $15 million (1978 rate) was caused by the 1978 Santa Barbara earthquake.		65
23	Costa Rica, Guanacaste Province	7.0	56.0	VIII			

=== September ===
September
- Strongest magnitude: 7.4 M_{w} Iran
- Deadliest: 7.4 M_{w} Iran; 20,000 deaths
- Total fatalities: 20,000

Number by magnitude
- 8.0–8.9: 0
- 7.0–7.9: 1
- 6.0–6.9: 7
- 5.0–5.9: 121
- 4.0–4.9: 210

Date	Country and location	M_{w}	Depth (km)	MMI	Notes	Casualties	
Date	Country and location	M_{w}	Depth (km)	MMI	Notes	Dead	Injured
1	Solomon Islands	6.2	33.0	VI			
2	Taiwan, off the northeast coast	6.1	109.0	V			
3	West Germany, Baden-Wurttemberg	5.3	8.0	VIII	Many (at least 101) people were injured. Major damage was reported with costs reaching $150 million (1978 rate).		101
6	New Hebrides, Vanuatu	6.0	198.0	IV			
15	Soviet Union, East Kazakhstan Region, Kazakhstan	6.0	0.0		Nuclear test.		
16	Iran, Yazd Province	7.4	33.0	IX	Deadliest event of 1978. Around 20,000 people were killed in the 1978 Tabas earthquake. Major property damage was caused with costs reaching $50 million (1978 rate).	20,000	
23	New Hebrides, Vanuatu	6.3	201.0	IV			

=== October ===
October
- Strongest magnitude: 5.9 M_{w} 2 events
- Total fatalities: 0

Number by magnitude
- 8.0–8.9: 0
- 7.0–7.9: 0
- 6.0–6.9: 0
- 5.0–5.9: 120
- 4.0–4.9: 136

Date	Country and location	M_{w}	Depth (km)	MMI	Notes	Casualties	
Date	Country and location	M_{w}	Depth (km)	MMI	Notes	Dead	Injured

=== November ===
November
- Strongest magnitude: 7.7 M_{w} Mexico
- Deadliest: 7.7 M_{w} Mexico; 9 deaths
- Total fatalities: 9

Number by magnitude
- 8.0–8.9: 0
- 7.0–7.9: 2
- 6.0–6.9: 6
- 5.0–5.9: 125
- 4.0–4.9: 221

Date	Country and location	M_{w}	Depth (km)	MMI	Notes	Casualties	
Date	Country and location	M_{w}	Depth (km)	MMI	Notes	Dead	Injured
1	Soviet Union, Gorno-Badakhshan Autonomous Region, Tajikistan	6.8	40.0	IX	Major damage was caused.		
4	Iran, Gilan Province	6.1	34.0	VI			
4	Solomon Islands	6.9	33.0	VI	Beginning of a series of events.		
4	Solomon Islands	6.0	33.0	V			
5	Solomon Islands	7.1	33.0	VII			
7	Solomon Islands	6.1	33.0	VI			
29	Soviet Union, East Kazakhstan Region, Kazakhstan	6.0	0.0		Nuclear test.		
29	Mexico, Oaxaca	7.7	18.0	IX	Largest event in 1978. 9 people were killed in the 1978 Oaxaca earthquake. At least 101 people were injured. Some damage was caused.	9	101

=== December ===
December
- Strongest magnitude: 7.0 M_{w} Taiwan
- Deadliest: 6.2 M_{w} Iran; 76 deaths
- Total fatalities: 78

Number by magnitude
- 8.0–8.9: 0
- 7.0–7.9: 1
- 6.0–6.9: 9
- 5.0–5.9: 112
- 4.0–4.9: 274

Date	Country and location	M_{w}	Depth (km)	MMI	Notes	Casualties	
Date	Country and location	M_{w}	Depth (km)	MMI	Notes	Dead	Injured
1	Solomon Islands	6.0	93.0	IV			
6	Soviet Union, Kuril Islands, Russia	6.7	91.0	VIII	Some damage was caused.		
12	Philippines, Mindanao	6.9	33.0	IX			
14	Iran, Khuzestan Province	6.2	33.0	VII	76 people were killed and at least 51 were injured. Some damage was caused.	76	51
18	Soviet Union, Atyrau Region, Kazakhstan	6.0	0.0		Nuclear test.		
21	Solomon Islands	6.3	30.0	V			
23	Taiwan, off the east coast	7.0	33.0	VI	2 people were killed and 3 were injured.	2	3
