= Fukushima earthquake =

Several earthquakes at or near Fukushima, Japan, have been recorded:

- 2011 Fukushima earthquake in April – the strongest aftershock on land of the disastrous Tōhoku earthquake and tsunami
- 2016 Fukushima earthquake
- 2021 Fukushima earthquake in February
- 2022 Fukushima earthquake - a 7.4 magnitude offshore quake
