= Sa Calobra =

Village in Mallorca, Spain

Coordinates: 39.8436°N 2.7925°E

Sa Calobra is a small village in the Escorca municipality on the northwest coast of the Spanish Balearic island of Mallorca.

The port village is a popular destination for coach trips and road cyclists. It is accessed by a single winding road, designed by Italian-Spanish engineer Antonio Parietti and opened in 1933, which features many hairpin bends and a 270° spiral bridge called the tie knot. The climb is officially called the Coll del Reis or the Coll de Cal Reis, the pass on 682 metres (2,238 ft) altitude, though it is often referred to by the name of the village at its base and was built and is considered to be "as close as one could get to a perfect road for motorsport". Unconventionally the road was engineered with tourists in mind.

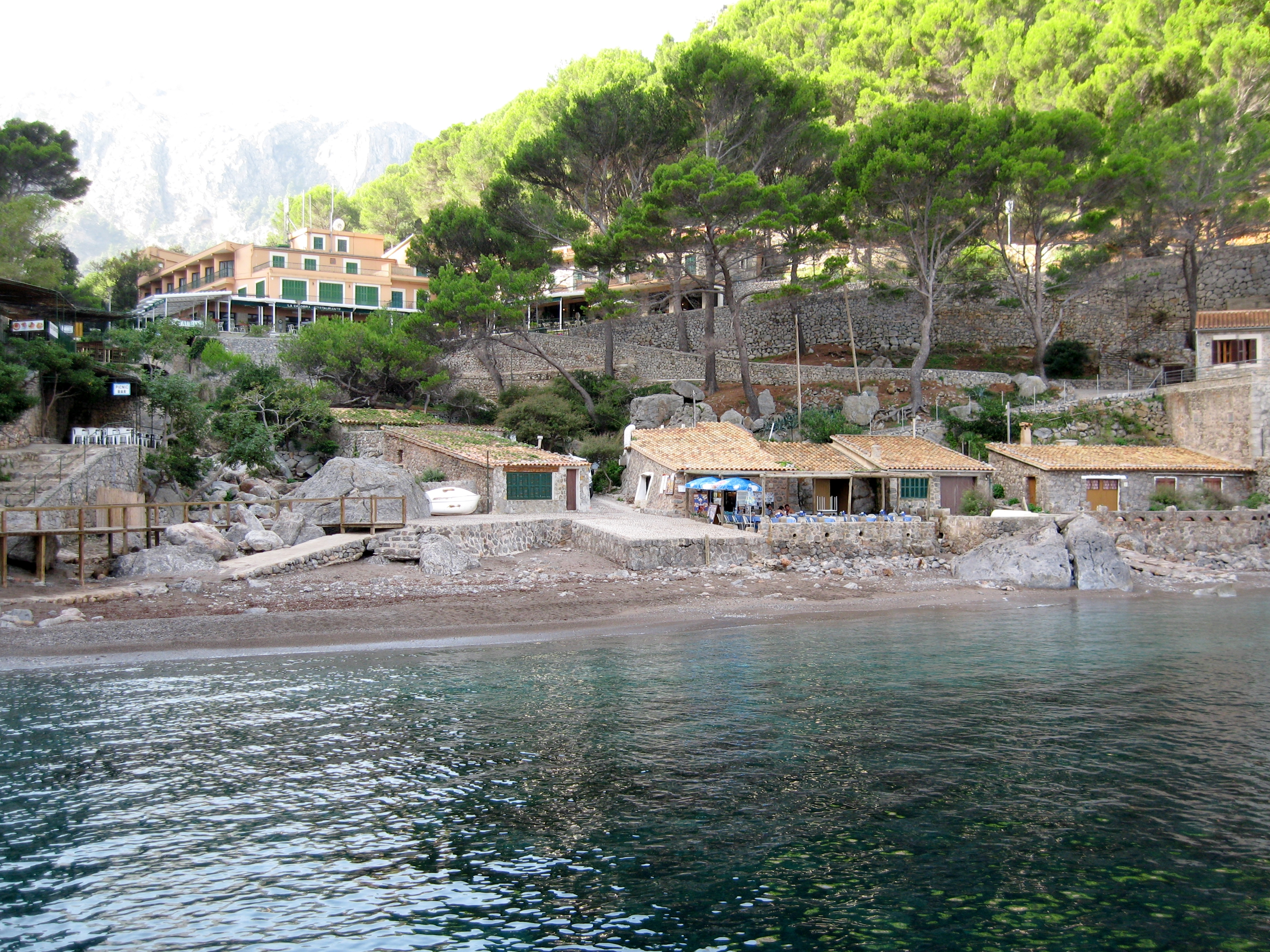
Sa Calobra

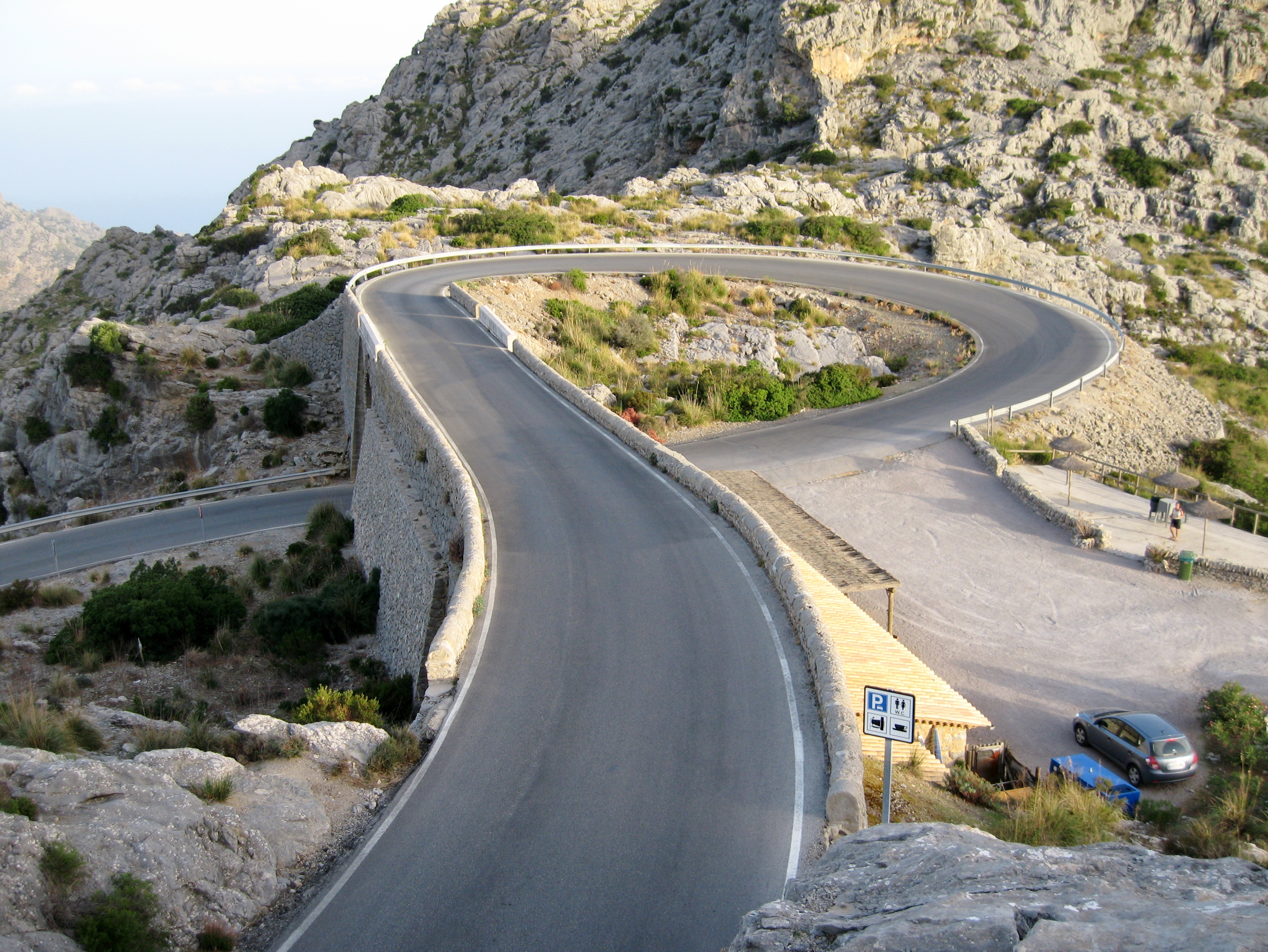
Spiral bridge on the road to Sa Calobra
