= 1978 Izu Ōshima earthquake =

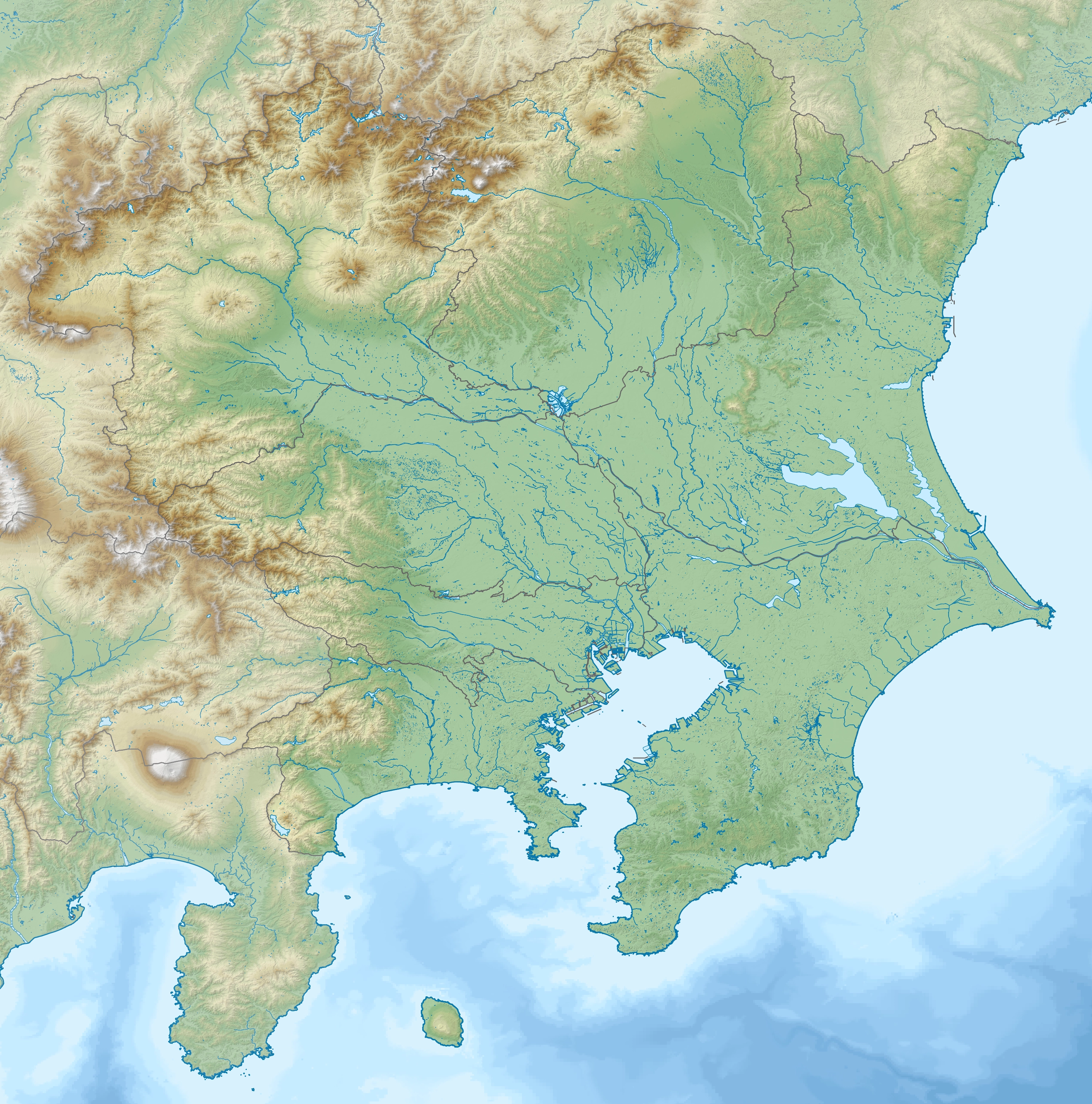
- Location within Kanto Area
- UTC time: 1978-01-14 03:24:39
- ISC event: 687650
- USGS-ANSS: ComCat
- Local date: 14 January 1978
- Local time: 12:24:39
- Magnitude: 6.6 M_{s} 7.0 M_{JMA}
- Depth: 14 km (9 mi)
- Epicenter: 34.64°N 130.3°E
- Fault: Inatori Fault
- Areas affected: Japan, Shizuoka Prefecture
- Max. intensity: JMA 6+
- Tsunami: Minor non-destructive tsunami which was tens of cm tall
- Aftershocks: Yes, largest is M_{s} 5.7
- Casualties: 25 dead, 129 injured, 4 missing

The 1978 Izu Ōshima earthquake (Japanese: 伊豆大島近海の地震) was a magnitude M_{JMA}7.0 earthquake that occurred on January 14, 1978, at 12:24:39 Japanese Standard Time. The epicenter was located offshore Izu Ōshima, Japan (north latitude 34°, 38' and longitude 130°, 18' east) in Sagami Bay at depth 14 km. The earthquake caused 25 casualties, 129 injuries, and damage to farms and infrastructure.

== Damages and casualties ==
The total damages from the earthquake and resulting landslides are as follows: 25 people were killed, 4 were reported missing, 129 were injured, 85 houses were completely destroyed, 544 were damaged, and approximately 18.77 ha of farmland was buried. The total cost of public damage was 31,251,129,000 yen or 173,620,000 USD. Additionally, infrastructure such as roads, railway lines, and port structures were damaged. Fault-like cracks and displacements appeared in the ground throughout the meizoseismal zone.

=== Landslides ===
In the Mitaka-iriya and Nanamawari areas, the Izu Ōshima earthquake caused several landslides. The most severe landslide was located 4 km inland from the east coast of the Nanamawari village. The main shock caused approximately 300,000 m^3 of soil to slide down a 150 m tall mountain at 12 m/s and crushed 4 houses, 5 barns, 7 people, and 1 dog. The soil traveled across the small Tajiri river until it climbed 20 m up a neighboring mountain situated 150 m away.

=== Mochikoshi tailings dam damage ===
The Mochikoshi Concentration Plant was constructed in the upper region of the Kano River. The purpose of this plant was to separate gold and silver from mined quartz vein ore. The tailings dam was made up of three dikes which contained waste from mining and sorting operations. At the time of the earthquake, the dam contained around 480,000 m^3 of quartz veins deposits.

The earthquake's main shock liquefied the first dikes' tailings, destabilizing and rupturing the dike. As a result, the first dike released approximately 80,000 m^3 of its sodium cyanide containing contents. The first dike's materials permeated 7 to 8 km into the valley. The second dike failed 5 hours and 20 minutes after the largest aftershock. 3,000 m^3 of its contents traveled 150 m into a second valley. The third dike was not damaged in the earthquake.

== See also ==
- List of earthquakes in 1978
- List of earthquakes in Japan
