= Japan National Route 414 =

Road in Shizuoka prefecture, Japan

National Route 414
- 国道414号
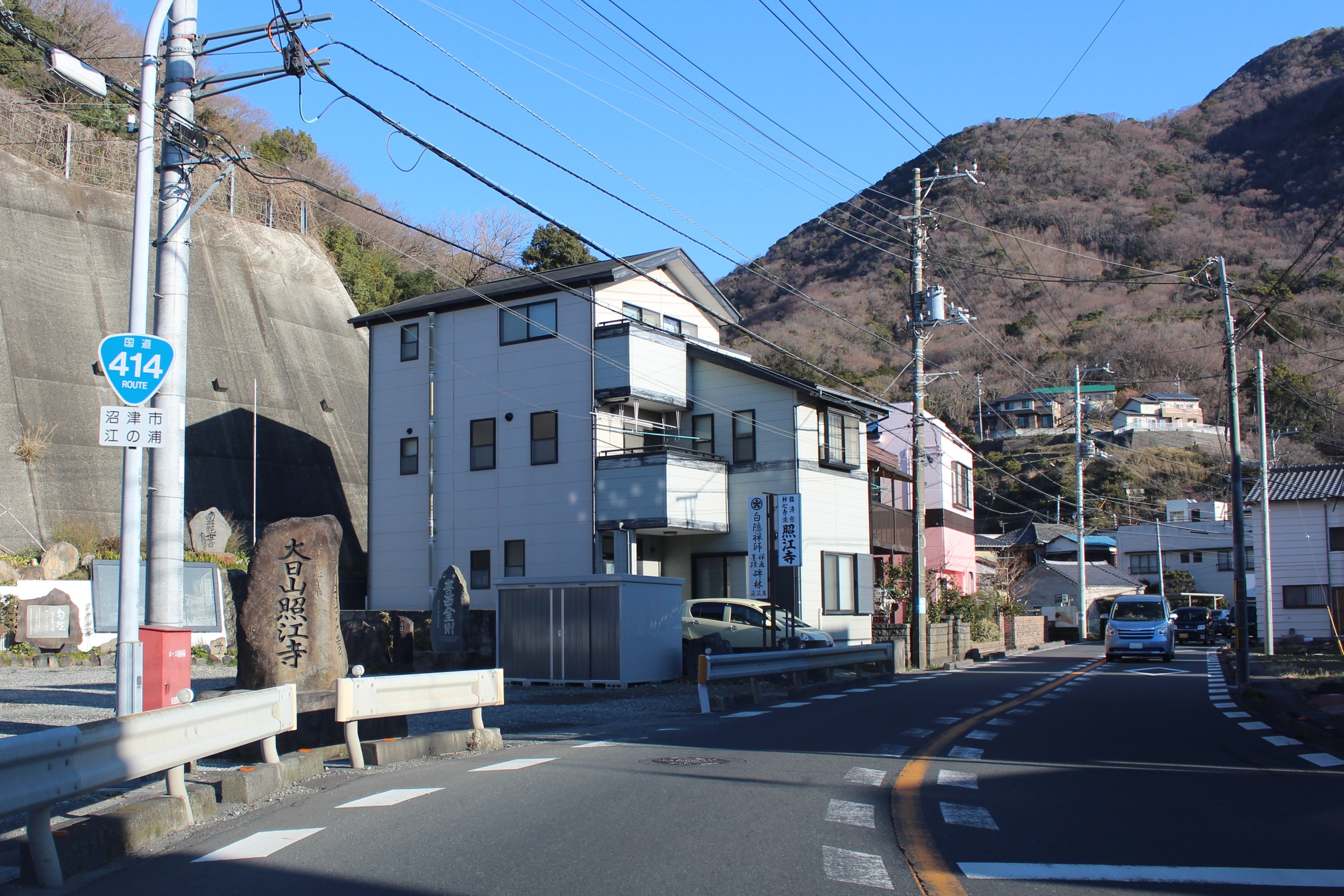

Route information
- Length: 73.7 km (45.8 mi)

Location
- Country: Japan

Highway system
- National highways of Japan; Expressways of Japan
← National Route 413	→ National Route 415

National Route 414 (国道414号, Kokudō 414-gō) is a national highway of Japan connecting Shimoda, Shizuoka and Numazu, Shizuoka in Japan, with a total length of 73.7 km (45.8 mi).
