= Lists of 20th-century earthquakes =

Earthquakes of magnitude 8.0 and greater from 1900 to 2018. The apparent 3D volumes of the bubbles are linearly proportional to their respective fatalities.

This list of 20th-century earthquakes is a list of earthquakes of magnitude 6 and above that occurred in the 20th century. Some smaller events which nevertheless had a significant impact are also included. After 1900 most earthquakes have some degree of instrumental records and this means that the locations and magnitudes are more reliable than for earlier events.

Unless otherwise noted, times are local time and magnitudes use the moment magnitude scale (M_{w}).

20th-century earthquakes – M 7.0 or greater (map data)

== List of deadliest earthquakes ==
Rank	Event	Fatalities	Magnitude	Location	Date
1	1920 Haiyuan earthquake	258,707–273,407	7.9	China	December 16, 1920
2	1976 Tangshan earthquake	242,469	7.6	China	July 28, 1976
3	1908 Messina earthquake	120,000	7.1	Italy	December 28, 1908
4	Great Kantō earthquake	105,385	7.9–8.2	Japan	September 1, 1923
5	1970 Ancash earthquake	66,794–70,000	7.9	Peru	May 31, 1970
6	1927 Gulang earthquake	40,912	7.7	China	May 23, 1927
7	1990 Manjil–Rudbar earthquake	35,000–45,000	7.4	Iran	June 21, 1990
8	1939 Erzincan earthquake	32,700–32,968	7.8	Turkey	December 27, 1939
9	1935 Quetta earthquake	30,000–60,000	7.7	British Raj (now Pakistan)	May 31, 1935
10	1915 Avezzano earthquake	29,978–32,610	6.7	Italy	January 13, 1915
11	1939 Chillán earthquake	~28,000	8.3 M_{s}	Chile	January 24, 1939
12	1988 Armenian earthquake	25,000–50,000	6.8 M_{s}	Armenia	December 7, 1988
13	1976 Guatemala earthquake	23,000	7.5	Guatemala	February 4, 1976
14	1905 Kangra earthquake	>20,000	7.8 M_{s}	India	April 4, 1905
15	1999 İzmit earthquake	17,127–18,373	7.6	Turkey	August 17, 1999
16	1968 Dasht-e Bayaz and Ferdows earthquakes	15,900	7.1	Iran	August 31, 1968
17	1978 Tabas earthquake	15,000–25,000	7.4	Iran	September 16, 1978
18	1962 Buin Zahra earthquake	12,225	7.1 M_{L}	Iran	September 1, 1962
19	1960 Agadir earthquake	12,000–15,000	5.8	Morocco	February 29, 1960
19	1907 Qaratog earthquake	12,000–15,000	7.4 M_{s}	Tajikistan	October 21, 1907
21	1934 Nepal–India earthquake	10,700–12,000	8.0	Nepal–India	January 15, 1934
22	1970 Tonghai earthquake	10,000–15,621	7.1	China	January 5, 1970
22	1931 Fuyun earthquake	10,000	8.0	China	August 11, 1931
22	1944 San Juan earthquake	10,000	7.0	Argentina	January 15, 1944
23	1902 Kashgar earthquake	5,650–10,000	7.7	Xinjiang, China; Kyrgyzstan	August 22, 1902
24	1985 Mexico City earthquake	5,000–45,000	8.0	Mexico	September 19, 1985
25	1972 Nicaragua earthquake	4,000–11,000	6.3	Nicaragua	December 23, 1972

- Note: 10,000 or more fatalities

== List of largest earthquakes by magnitude ==
Rank	Event	Magnitude	Fatalities	Location	Date
1	1960 Valdivia earthquake	9.4–9.6	1,000–6,000	Chile	May 22, 1960
2	1964 Alaska earthquake	9.2–9.3	139	United States	March 27, 1964
3	1952 Severo-Kurilsk earthquake	8.8–9.0	2,336–14,000	Soviet Union (now Russia)	November 5, 1952
3	1906 Ecuador–Colombia earthquake	8.8	~1,000	Ecuador – Colombia	January 31, 1906
5	1965 Rat Islands earthquake	8.7		United States	February 3, 1965
5	1950 Assam–Tibet earthquake	8.7	4,800	India – China	August 15, 1950
7	1957 Andreanof Islands earthquake	8.6	2	United States	March 9, 1957
7	1946 Aleutian Islands earthquake	8.6	165–173	United States	April 1, 1946
9	1938 Banda Sea earthquake	8.5–8.6		Dutch East Indies (now Indonesia)	February 2, 1938
9	1963 Kuril Islands earthquake	8.5		Soviet Union (now Russia)	October 13, 1963

- Note: Magnitude 8.5 or greater

== List of deadliest earthquakes by year ==
Year	Event	Fatalities	Total fatalities	Magnitude	Location	Date
1901	1901 Yunnan earthquake	101	125	6.5	China	February 15
1902	1902 Xinjiang earthquake	10,000	17,075	7.7	China	August 22
1903	1903 Manzikert earthquake	3,560	3,913	6.3	Ottoman Empire (now Turkey)	April 28
1904	1904 Sichuan earthquake	1,300	1,300	6.8 M_{s}	China	August 30
1905	1905 Kangra earthquake	20,000	22,802	7.8 M_{s}	British Raj (now India)	April 4
1906	1906 Valparaíso earthquake	4,000	7,507	8.2	Chile	August 17
1907	1907 Qaratog earthquake	12,000	13,568	7.3 M_{s}	Russian Empire (now Tajikistan)	October 21
1908	1908 Messina earthquake	120,000	120,000	7.1	Kingdom of Italy (now Italy)	December 28
1909	1909 Borujerd earthquake	8,000	8,689	7.3	Iran	January 23
1910	1910 Costa Rica earthquakes	700	714	6.4	Costa Rica	May 4
1911	1911 Kerman earthquake	700	1,326	6.5	Iran	April 18
1912	1912 Mürefte earthquake	3,000	3,153	7.1	Ottoman Empire (now Turkey)	August 9
1913	1913 Eshan earthquake	942	1,445	6.7	China	December 21
1914	1914 Burdur earthquake	4,000	4,380	7.0	Ottoman Empire (now Turkey)	October 3
1915	1915 Avezzano earthquake	29,978	30,155	6.7	Italy	January 13
1916	1916–1917 Nantou earthquakes	180	181	7.2	Japan (now Taiwan)	August 28
1917	1917 Guatemala earthquakes	2,650	6,221	6.0	Guatemala	December 26
1918	1918 Shantou earthquake	2,000	2,221	7.3	China	February 13
1919	1919 Ayvalık earthquake	3,000	3,100	7.0	Ottoman Empire (now Turkey)	November 19
1920	1920 Haiyuan earthquake	273,407	273,407	7.9	China	December 16
1921	1921 Massawa earthquake	51	51	5.9	Italian Eritrea (now Eritrea)	August 14
1922	1922 Vallenar earthquake	700	710	8.5	Chile	November 11
1923	1923 Great Kantō earthquake	105,385	105,385	7.9	Japan	September 1
1924	1924 Java earthquake	727	1,652	na	Dutch East Indies (now Indonesia)	December 27
1925	1925 Dali earthquake	5,000	6,193	7.0	China	March 16
1926	1926 Kars earthquake	360	976	5.7	Turkey	October 22
1927	1927 Gulang earthquake	40,912	44,452	7.7	China	May 22
1928	1928 Talca earthquake	279	807	7.7	Chile	December 1
1929	1929 Kopet Dag earthquake	3,800	3,972	7.2	Turkmen SSR (now Turkmenistan)	May 1
1930	1930 Irpinia earthquake	1,430	4,254	6.4	Italy	July 23
1931	1931 Fuyun earthquake	10,000	10,000	8.0	China	August 11
1932	1932 Mazandaran earthquake	1,070	2,206	5.4 M_{s}	Iran	May 20
1933	1933 Diexi earthquake	9,300	12,656	7.3	China	August 25
1934	1934 Nepal–India earthquake	12,000	12,007	8.0	Nepal–India	January 15
1935	1935 Quetta earthquake	60,000	67,489	7.7	British Raj (now Pakistan)	May 30
1936	1936 Lingshan earthquake	1,001	2,128	6.8	China	April 1
1937	1937 Heze earthquakes	390	497	6.9	China	July 31
1938	1938 Kirsehir earthquake	224	296	6.6	Turkey	April 19
1939	1939 Erzincan earthquake	32,700	62,860	7.8	Turkey	December 26
1940	1940 Vrancea earthquake	1,000	1,448	7.8	Romania	November 10
1941	1941 Jabal Razih earthquake	1,200	2,955	6.2	Saudi Arabia	January 11
1942	1942 Niksar–Erbaa earthquake	1,000	1,489	7.0	Turkey	December 20
1943	1943 Tosya–Ladik earthquake	4,020	6,187	7.5	Turkey	November 26
1944	1944 San Juan earthquake	8,000	11,637	7.0	Argentina	January 15
1945	1945 Balochistan earthquake	4,000	6,337	8.1	India (now Pakistan)	November 27
1946	1946 Dominican Republic earthquake	1,790	1,790	7.8	Dominican Republic	August 4
1947	1947 Dustabad earthquake	500	745	6.9	Iran	September 23
1948	1948 Ashgabat earthquake	110,000	116,135	7.3 M_{s}	Turkmen SSR (now Turkmenistan)	October 5
1949	1949 Khait earthquake	12,000	18,484	7.5	Tajik SSR (now Tajikistan)	July 10
1950	1950 Assam–Tibet earthquake	4,800	4,800	8.7	India–China	August 15
1951	1951 El Salvador earthquake	1,100	2,236	6.5	El Salvador	May 6
1952	1952 Severo-Kurilsk earthquake	4,000	4,224	9.0	Russian SFSR (now Russia)	November 4
1953	1953 Yenice–Gönen earthquake	1,070	2,621	7.3	Turkey	March 18
1954	1954 Chlef earthquake	1,243	1,295	6.7	French Algeria (now Algeria)	September 9
1955	1955 Lanao earthquake	465	465	7.4	Philippines	March 31
1956	1956 Hormozgan earthquake	347	910	6.4	Iran	October 31
1957	1957 Farsinaj earthquake	1,200	3,043	6.5	Iran	December 13
1958	1958 Lorestan earthquake	132	368	6.7	Iran	August 16
1959	1959 Hebgen Lake earthquake	28	94	7.3	United States	August 18
1960	1960 Agadir earthquake	13,100	15,956	5.8	Morocco	February 29
1961	1961 Fars earthquake	60	128	6.4	Iran	June 11
1962	1962 Buin Zahra earthquake	12,225	12,332	7.0	Iran	September 1
1963	1963 Skopje earthquake	1,100	1,100	6.1	Yugoslavia (now North Macedonia)	July 26
1964	1964 Alaska earthquake	139	389	9.2	United States	March 28
1965	1965 Valparaíso earthquake	400	800	7.6	Chile	March 28
1966	1966 Xingtai earthquakes	8,064	8,064	6.8	China	March 22
1967	1967 Caracas earthquake	300	961	6.6	Venezuela	July 29
1968	1968 Dasht-e Bayaz and Ferdows earthquakes	10,488	12,081	7.1	Iran	August 31
1969	1969 Yangjiang earthquake	3,000	4,024	5.7	China	July 25
1970	1970 Ancash earthquake	66,794	78,365	7.9	Peru	May 31
1971	1971 Bingöl earthquake	1,000	1,290	6.9	Turkey	May 22
1972	1972 Qir earthquake	30,000	40,124	6.6	Iran	April 10
1973	1973 Luhuo earthquake	2,199	2,899	7.4	China	February 6
1974	1974 Zhaotong earthquake	20,000	25,442	6.8	China	May 10
1975	1975 Lice earthquake	2,311	4,379	6.7	Turkey	September 6
1976	1976 Tangshan earthquake	242,469	242,469	7.6	China	July 28
1977	1977 Vrancea earthquake	3,002	3,002	7.5	Romania	March 4
1978	1978 Tabas earthquake	20,000	20,220	7.5	Iran	September 16
1979	1979 Tumaco earthquake	600	600	8.2	Ecuador	December 12
1980	1980 El Asnam earthquake	5,000	10,326	7.3	Algeria	October 10
1981	1981 Golbaf earthquake	3,000	3,000	6.7	Iran	June 11
1982	1982 North Yemen earthquake	2,800	3,388	6.3	Yemen Arab Republic (now Yemen)	December 13
1983	1983 Erzurum earthquake	1,342	2,608	6.8	Turkey	October 30
1984	1984 Nagano earthquake	29	29	6.3	Japan	September 13
1985	1985 Mexico City earthquake	45,000	45,000	8.0	Mexico	September 19
1986	1986 San Salvador earthquake	1,000	1,240	5.7	El Salvador	October 10
1987	1987 Ecuador earthquakes	1,000	1,090	7.1	Ecuador	March 6
1988	1988 Armenian earthquake	25,000	26,759	6.8 M_{s}	Armenia	December 7
1989	1989 Gissar earthquake	274	677	5.3	Tajik SSR (now Tajikistan)	January 22
1990	1990 Manjil–Rudbar earthquake	50,000	51,821	7.4	Iran	June 21
1991	1991 Uttarkashi earthquake	2,000	3,498	6.8	India	October 19
1992	1992 Flores earthquake	2,500	3,939	7.8	Indonesia	December 12
1993	1993 Latur earthquake	9,748	10,097	6.3	India	September 30
1994	1994 Páez River earthquake	795	1,779	6.8	Colombia	June 6
1995	1995 Great Hanshin earthquake	6,433	8,911	6.9	Japan	January 16
1996	1996 Lijiang earthquake	322	582	6.6	China	February 3
1997	1997 Qayen earthquake	1,567	1,567	7.3	Iran	May 10
1998	1998 Afghanistan earthquake	4,500	4,500	6.6	Afghanistan	May 30
1999	1999 İzmit earthquake	18,373	18,528	7.6	Turkey	August 17
2000	2000 Enggano earthquake	141	141	7.9	Indonesia	June 4

== 1901–1910 ==
Date	Time	Event	Magnitude	Fatalities	Location	Comments	Sources
March 3, 1901	07:45		6.4 M_{s}		Parkfield, United States	(Abe, 1988)	USGS
March 31, 1901	07:10	1901 Black Sea earthquake	7.2	4	Black Sea (now Bulgaria)		
November 16, 1901	07:47		6.9		Cheviot, New Zealand		
April 19, 1902	02:23	1902 Guatemala earthquake	7.5 M_{L}	2,000	Guatemala	(USGS 1000+)	USGS
August 22, 1902	05:04	1902 Turkestan earthquake	7.7	10,000	Qing dynasty (now China)		USGS
September 19, 1902			6.0 M_{L}	2	Warooka, Australia		USGS
December 16, 1902	05:04	1902 Andijan earthquake	6.4 M_{L}	4,882	Uzbekistan	(USGS 1000+)	USGS
April 29, 1903	01:46	1903 Malazgirt earthquake	6.7 M_{s}	3,500	Turkey		
August 27, 1904	21:56		7.3 M_{s}		Fairbanks, United States		USGS
November 5, 1904	04:25	1904 Douliu earthquake	6.1	145	Taiwan		
April 4, 1905	00:50	1905 Kangra earthquake	7.8 M_{s}	20,000	India	Kangra district HQ Dharamsala devastated	
July 9, 1905	09:40		8		Tsetserleg sum, Mongolia		
July 23, 1905	02:46		8.3–8.5		Mongolia		
September 8, 1905	01:43	1905 Calabria earthquake	7.2	557–5,000	Calabria (now Italy)		
January 31, 1906	15:36	1906 Ecuador–Colombia earthquake	8.8	1,000	Ecuador– Colombia		USGS
March 16, 1906	06:43	1906 Meishan earthquake	6.8 M_{s}	1,266	Taiwan		
April 18, 1906	13:12	1906 San Francisco earthquake	7.9	3,000	United States		USGS
August 17, 1906	00:10	1906 Aleutian Islands earthquake	8.35		Aleutian Islands (now United States)		
August 17, 1906	00:40	1906 Valparaíso earthquake	8.2	3,882	Chile		USGS
November 19, 1906	07:18		7.6		Western Australia (now Australia)		
January 4, 1907	05:19	1907 Sumatra earthquake	8.2–8.4	2,188	Sumatra (now Indonesia)		
January 14, 1907	03:30	1907 Kingston earthquake	6.5	800-1,000	Jamaica		USGS
October 21, 1907	04:23	1907 Qaratog earthquake	7.4 M_{s}	12,000–15,000	Tajikistan– Uzbekistan		USGS
October 23, 1907	21:28	1907 Calabria earthquake	5.9 M_{s}	167	Calabria (now Italy)		
December 28, 1908	04:20	1908 Messina earthquake	7.1	82,000	Italy		USGS
January 23, 1909	02:48	1909 Borujerd earthquake	7.3	8,000	Iran		
June 11, 1909	21:15	1909 Provence earthquake	6.0	46	France	Highest magnitude earthquake ever recorded in continental France. 250 wounded. 2,000 buildings damaged	

== 1911–1920 ==
Date	Time	Event	Magnitude	Fatalities	Location	Comments	Sources
January 3, 1911	23:25	1911 Kebin earthquake	7.7	452	Kazakhstan		
February 18, 1911	18:41	1911 Sarez earthquake	7.4 M_{s}	90	Tajikistan		
June 7, 1911	11:02 UTC	1911 Michoacán earthquake	7.6	45	Mexico		USGS
June 15, 1911	14:26 UTC	1911 Kikai Island earthquake	8.1 M_{s}	12	Japan		USGS
July 1, 1911	22:00		6.5		Calaveras Fault (California, United States)		
December 16, 1911	19:14 UTC	1911 Guerrero earthquake	7.6		Mexico		USGS
May 23, 1912	02:24 UTC	1912 Maymyo earthquake	7.7–8.0 M_{s}	1	Burma (now Myanmar)		
August 9, 1912	03:29	1912 Mürefte earthquake	7.3 M_{s}	216	Turkey		
March 15, 1914	20:00	1914 Senboku earthquake	7.0 M_{s}	94	Honshu (now Japan)		USGS
October 4, 1914	00:07	1914 Burdur earthquake	6.9 M_{s}	2,344	Turkey		
January 13, 1915	06:52	1915 Avezzano earthquake	7.5 M_{s}	32,610	Italy		
October 3, 1915	06:52	1915 Pleasant Valley earthquake	7.1		United States	(Stover and Coffman, 1993)	
January 20, 1917	23:11	1917 Bali earthquake	6.6 M_{s}	1,500	Bali (now Indonesia)		
June 26, 1917	05:49 UTC	1917 Samoa earthquake	8.5		Samoa		USGS
December 26, 1917	10:30	1917 Guatemala earthquake	5.6	250	Guatemala		USGS
February 18, 1918	06:07	1918 Shantou earthquake	7.2	1,000	China		USGS
June 7, 1918			6.0 M_{s}		Bundaberg–Rockhampton, Australia	Largest known Queensland earthquake	
August 15, 1918	12:18 UTC	1918 Celebes Sea earthquake	8.3	52	Celebes Sea (now Philippines)		
October 11, 1918	14:14	1918 San Fermín earthquake	7.5 M_{s}	116	Puerto Rico	(McCann, 1985)	USGS
December 6, 1918	08:41	1918 Vancouver Island earthquake	7 M_{L}		Vancouver Island (now Canada)	(Gutenberg and Richter, 1954: Rogers, 1983)	USGS
January 3, 1920	12:46	1920 Xalapa earthquake	7.8	648	Mexico		
February 20, 1920	11:45	1920 Gori earthquake	6.2 M_{s}	130	Georgia		USGS
September 7, 1920	07:55	1920 Garfagnana earthquake	6.5 M_{L}	171	Italy		
December 16, 1920	12:05	1920 Haiyuan earthquake	8.6 M_{s}	273,407	China		USGS
December 17, 1920	06:59	1920 Mendoza earthquake	6.0	400	Argentina		

== 1921–1930 ==
Date	Time	Event	Magnitude	Fatalities	Location	Comments	Sources
January 31, 1922	13:17		7.3 M_{GR}		offshore Cape Mendocino, California, United States	(Ellsworth, 1990)	USGS
March 10, 1922	11:21		6.1		Parkfield, United States	(Bakun and McEvilly, 1984)	USGS
November 11, 1922	04:32 UTC	1922 Vallenar earthquake	8.5	1,000	Atacama Region (now Chile)		USGS
January 22, 1923	09:04		7.2 M_{GR}		offshore Cape Mendocino, California, United States	(Ellsworth, 1990)	USGS
February 3, 1923		Kamchatka earthquakes	8.5		Kamchatka Peninsula (now Russia)		USGS
September 1, 1923	02:58	1923 Great Kantō earthquake	7.9	142,800	Kantō region (now Japan)		USGS
September 13, 1924	16:34	1924 Pasinler earthquake	6.8 M_{s}	60	Turkey		
February 28, 1925	21:19	1925 Charlevoix–Kamouraska earthquake	6.3		Charlevoix–Kamouraska, Canada	(Bent, 1992)	USGS
March 16, 1925	14:42	1925 Dali earthquake	7.0 M_{s}	5,000	Yunnan (now China)		
June 28, 1925	01:21		6.6		Clarkston Valley, Montana, United States	(Dosier, 1989)	USGS
June 29, 1925	14:42	1925 Santa Barbara earthquake	6.8	13	United States	(Stein and Hanks, 1998)	USGS
June 28, 1926	03:23	1926 Padang Panjang earthquake	7.6 M_{L}	354	West Sumatra (now Indonesia)		
October 22, 1926	12:35		6.1 M_{GR}		Monterey Bay, California, United States	(Ellsworth, 1990)	USGS
October 22, 1926	13:35		6.1 M_{GR}		Monterey Bay, California, United States	(Ellsworth, 1990)	USGS
March 7, 1927	09:27	1927 Kita Tango earthquake	7.0	2,956	Tango Peninsula (now Japan)		USGS
May 21, 1927	22:32 UTC	1927 Gulang earthquake	7.6	40,900	Gansu (now China)		USGS
July 11, 1927	15:04	1927 Jericho earthquake	6.3	500	Mandatory Palestine (now State of Palestine)		USGS
November 4, 1927	13:51		7.1		offshore Lompoc, United States	(Stein and Hanks, 1998)	USGS
March 31, 1928	02:29		6.5 M_{s}	50	İzmir, Turkey	Possible M=6.2 foreshock previous day	
May 14, 1928	22:14 UTC	1928 Chachapoyas earthquake	7.2	25	Peru		
December 2, 1928	04:06	1928 Talca earthquake	7.6	279	Maule Region (now Chile)		USGS
May 18, 1929	08:37		6.1 M_{s}	64	Suşehri, Turkey		
June 17, 1929	10:17	1929 Murchison earthquake	7.8 M_{s}	17	South Island (now New Zealand)		
November 18, 1929	20:32	1929 Grand Banks earthquake	7.3	28	Grand Banks of Newfoundland (now Canada)	(Bent, 1995)	USGS
May 5, 1930	13:46 UTC	1930 Bago earthquake	7.5 M_{s}	558	Burma (now Myanmar)		
May 6, 1930	22:34	1930 Salmas earthquake	7.1	3,000	Iran		USGS
July 2, 1930	21:03 UTC	1930 Dhubri earthquake	7.1 M_{s}		India		
July 23, 1930	00:08	1930 Irpinia earthquake	6.6 M_{s}	1,404	Irpinia (now Italy)		
November 25, 1930	19:02 UTC	1930 North Izu earthquake	7.3 M_{s}	272	Japan		
December 3, 1930	18:51 UTC	1930 Pyu earthquake	7.3	36	Burma (now Myanmar)		USGS

== 1931–1940 ==
Date	Time	Event	Magnitude	Fatalities	Location	Comments	Sources
January 27, 1931	20:09 UTC	1931 Myitkyina earthquake	7.6		Burma (now Myanmar)		USGS
February 3, 1931	10:47	1931 Hawke's Bay earthquake	7.7	258	New Zealand	Much of city destroyed; 40 km^{2} of seabed raised to become dry land	
March 31, 1931	10:23	1931 Nicaragua earthquake	6.1	2,450	Nicaragua	City destroyed.	-
April 27, 1931	16:50 UTC	1931 Zangezur earthquake	6.5	2,890	Zangezur Mountains (now Armenia)		
June 7, 1931	00:25	1931 Dogger Bank earthquake	6.1 M_{L}		North Sea (now United Kingdom)	(Musson, 1994) largest instrumentally recorded earthquake to have affected the United Kingdom	USGS
August 10, 1931	21:18	1931 Fuyun earthquake	8.0	10,000	China		
September 25, 1931	05:59 UTC	1931 Southwest Sumatra earthquake	7.3		Sumatra (now Indonesia)		USGS
June 3, 1932	10:36	1932 Jalisco earthquake	8.1	400	Mexico		
June 18, 1932	10:12		7.8 M_{s}		Colima, Mexico		
June 22, 1932	12:59		7.0 M_{s}	75	Jalisco, Mexico		
September 26, 1932	19:20	1932 Ierissos earthquake	7.0 M_{s}	491	Greece		
December 21, 1932	06:10	1932 Cedar Mountain earthquake	7.2		United States		USGS
December 25, 1932	10:04	1932 Changma earthquake	7.6 M_{s}	275	Gansu (now China)		
March 2, 1933	17:31	1933 Sanriku earthquake	8.4	2,990	Sanriku (now Japan)		USGS
March 11, 1933	01:54	1933 Long Beach earthquake	6.4	115	United States	(Hauksson & Gross, 1991)	USGS
August 25, 1933	07:50	1933 Diexi earthquake	7.3	9,300	Sichuan (now China)		USGS
November 20, 1933	23:21		7.4		Baffin Bay (now Canada)	(Stein et al. 1979)	USGS
January 15, 1934	08:43	1934 Nepal–India earthquake	8.1	10,700	Nepal–India	(Chen and Molnar, 1977)	USGS
June 8, 1934	04:47		6.1		Parkfield, United States	(Bakun and McEvilly, 1984)	USGS
January 4, 1935	16:41		6.4 M_{s}	5	Erdek, Turkey		
April 21, 1935	6:02	1935 Shinchiku-Taichū earthquake	7.0	3,276	Taiwan		
May 30, 1935	21:32	1935 Quetta earthquake	7.7	60,000	Balochistan (now Pakistan)		
November 1, 1935	06:03	1935 Timiskaming earthquake	6.2		Canada	(Bent, 1996)	USGS
December 28, 1935	02:35	1935 Sumatra earthquake	7.7		Sumatra (now Indonesia)		
November 2, 1936	20:45 UTC	1936 Miyagi earthquake	7.2 M_{s}		Japan		
July 22, 1937	17:09	Salcha Seismic Zone	7.3 M_{s}		United States		USGS
July 26, 1937	03:47 UTC	1937 Orizaba earthquake	7.3 M_{s}	34	Veracruz (now Mexico)		
January 23, 1938	08:32		6.8 M_{s}		Maui (Hawaii, United States)	(Klein and Wright, 2000)	USGS
April 19, 1938	12:59		6.6 M_{s}	160	Kırşehir, Turkey		
November 10, 1938	20:18		8.2		Shumagin Islands (Alaska, United States)		USGS
January 25, 1939	23:32	1939 Chillán earthquake	7.8 M_{s}	28,000	Chile		USGS
September 22, 1939	02:36		6.6 M_{s}	60	Dikili, Turkey		
December 26, 1939	23:57	1939 Erzincan earthquake	7.8 M_{s}	32,968	Turkey		USGS
May 19, 1940	04:36	1940 El Centro earthquake	7.1	9	Imperial Valley, United States	(Ellsworth, 1990)	USGS
November 10, 1940	01:39	1940 Vrancea earthquake	7.7	1,000	Romania	(LT, 2007)	USGS

== 1941–1950 ==
Date	Time	Event	Magnitude	Fatalities	Location	Comments	Sources	
April 15, 1941	19:09 UTC	1941 Colima earthquake	7.7 M_{s}	90	Mexico			
April 29, 1941	01:35		7.2 M_{L}		Meeberrie, Western Australia, Australia			
June 26, 1941	17:22	1941 Andaman Islands earthquake	8.1	8,000	Andaman and Nicobar Islands (now India)		USGS	
December 17, 1941	19:19	1941 Chungpu earthquake	6.9	358	Taiwan		USGS	
August 6, 1942	23:37 UTC	1942 Guatemala earthquake	7.7	38	Guatemala		USGS	
August 24, 1942	22:50 UTC	1942 Peru earthquake	8.2	30	Peru		USGS	
November 15, 1942	19:01		6.1 M_{s}	16	Bigadiç, Turkey			
December 20, 1942	14:03	1942 Niksar–Erbaa earthquake	7.0 M_{s}	3,000	Turkey			
April 6, 1943	12:07	1943 Ovalle earthquake	7.9–8.2	12	Chile		USGS	
June 8 and 9, 1943	20:42 UTC and 03:06 UTC	1943 Alahan Panjang earthquakes	7.2 and 7.5		Sumatra (now Indonesia)			
June 20, 1943	17:32		6.6 M_{s}	336	Hendek, Turkey			
July 23, 1943	14:53 UTC	1943 Central Java earthquake	7.0	213	Central Java (now Indonesia)			
November 26, 1943	00:20	1943 Tosya–Ladik earthquake	7.5	4,000	Turkey			
January 15, 1944	20:50 GMT-3	1944 San Juan earthquake	7.0	8,000–10,000	Argentina	The 30-second long earthquake destroyed 95% of the city, located 30 km from the epicentre.		
February 1, 1944	03:25	1944 Bolu–Gerede earthquake	7.5	3,959	Turkey			
October 6, 1944	04:34		6.8 M_{s}	30	Ayvalık, Turkey			
December 7, 1944	04:35		8.1	1,223	Kii Peninsula (now Japan)	known as 東南海地震 (Tōnankai Jishin) 1944 Tōnankai earthquake		USGS
November 27, 1945	21:56	1945 Balochistan earthquake	8.1	4,000	offshore Pakistan	Tsunami from submarine slumping		
April 1, 1946	12:28	1946 Aleutian Islands earthquake	7.3 M_{s}	165	Aleutian Islands (now United States)	(Stover and Coffman, 1993)	USGS	
June 23, 1946	17:13	1946 Vancouver Island earthquake	7.3 M_{L}		Vancouver Island (now Canada)	(Gutenberg and Richter, 1954: Rogers, 1983)	USGS	
August 4, 1946	17:51	1946 Dominican Republic earthquake	8.0 M_{s}	2,550	Dominican Republic	(Abe, 1981)	USGS	
September 12, 1946	15:17	1946 Sagaing earthquakes	8.0 & 7.8 M_{s}		Burma (now Myanmar)			
September 15, 1946			6.2 M_{s}		Launceston, Australia			
December 20, 1946	19:19	1946 Nankaidō earthquake	8.1	1,330	Nankaidō (now Japan)		USGS	
July 29, 1947	13:43	1947 Assam earthquake	7.3		India			
October 16, 1947	02:09		7.2		Fairbanks, United States		USGS	
January 25, 1948	01:46 PST	1948 Lady Caycay earthquake	7.8	50	Panay (now Philippines)		USGS	
May 25, 1948	07:11	1948 Litang earthquake	7.2	800	China			
June 28, 1948	07:13	1948 Fukui earthquake	6.8	3,769	Japan		USGS	
October 5, 1948	20:12	1948 Ashgabat earthquake	7.3	110,000	Turkmenistan		USGS	
April 13, 1949	19:55	1949 Olympia earthquake	7.1 M_{L}	8	United States	(Baker and Langston, 1987)	USGS	
July 10, 1949	03:53	1949 Khait earthquake	7.5	7,200	Tajikistan			
August 5, 1949	14:05	1949 Ambato earthquake	6.4 M_{s}	6,000	Ecuador		USGS	
August 17, 1949	18:44	1949 Karlıova earthquake	6.8 M_{s}	450	Turkey			
August 22, 1949	04:01	1949 Queen Charlotte earthquake	8.1 M_{s}		Queen Charlotte Islands (now Canada)	(Gutenberg and Richter, 1954)	USGS	
December 17, 1949	06:53	1949 Tierra del Fuego earthquakes	7.8 M_{L}		Chile– Argentina			
August 15, 1950	14:09	1950 Assam–Tibet earthquake	8.6	4,800	Assam– Tibet		USGS	

== 1951–1960 ==
Date	Time	Event	Magnitude	Fatalities	Location	Comments	Sources
August 13, 1951	18:36	1951 Kurşunlu earthquake	6.9 M_{s}	50	Turkey		
August 21, 1951	10:57		6.9 M_{s}		Kona (Hawaii, United States)	(Klein and Wright, 2000)	USGS
July 21, 1952	11:52	1952 Kern County earthquake	7.3	12	United States	(Stein and Hanks, 1998)	USGS
November 5, 1952	04:58	1952 Severo-Kurilsk earthquake	9.0	2,336	Kamchatka (now Russia)		USGS
February 12, 1953	08:15	1953 Torud earthquake	6.6	973	Iran		USGS
March 18, 1953	21:06	1953 Yenice–Gönen earthquake	7.2 M_{s}	1,070	Turkey		
May 6, 1953	17:16 UTC	1953 Concepción earthquake	7.6 M_{s}	12	Chile		
August 8–12, 1953	09:24	1953 Ionian earthquake	6.8	476	Kefalonia (now Greece)	113 tremors over five days	
September 14, 1953	00:27 UTC	1953 Suva earthquake	6.8 M_{s}	8	Fiji		
December 6, 1953	16:18		7.4	3	Calama, Chile		
December 12, 1953	17:31 UTC	1953 Tumbes earthquake	7.5	6	Peru		
March 29, 1954	06:17		7.9		Spain		USGS
July 6, 1954	11:13		6.6		Rainbow Mountain, United States	(Ellsworth, 1990)	USGS
August 24, 1954	05:51		6.8		Stillwater, United States	(Ellsworth, 1990)	USGS
September 9, 1954	01:04	1954 Chlef earthquake	6.7	1,409	Algeria		USGS
December 16, 1954	11:07		7.1		Fairview Peak, United States	(Ellsworth, 1990)	USGS
December 16, 1954	11:11		6.8		Dixie Valley, United States	(Ellsworth, 1990)	USGS
July 16, 1955	09:07		6.8 M_{s}	23	Söke, Turkey		
September 12, 1955	06:09 UTC	1955 Alexandria earthquake	6.3 M_{s}	18	offshore Egypt		
September 23, 1955	15:06 UTC	1955 Yuzha earthquake	6.8 M_{s}	728	Sichuan–Yunnan, China		
July 16, 1956	15:07 UTC	1956 Sagaing earthquake	7.1		Burma (now Myanmar)		USGS
July 21, 1956	21:02	1956 Anjar earthquake	6.3	115	India		USGS
October 24, 1956	14:42 UTC	1956 Nicaragua earthquake	7.3 M_{s}		Nicaragua		
March 9, 1957	14:22	1957 Andreanof Islands earthquake	8.6		Andreanof Islands (now United States)		USGS
April 25, 1957	04:25		7.1	67	Fethiye, Turkey		
May 26, 1957	6:36	1957 Abant earthquake	7.1 M_{s}	52	Turkey		
December 4, 1957	03:37	1957 Mongolia earthquake	8.1	30	Govi-Altai Province (now Mongolia)		USGS
April 7, 1958	15:30		7.3		Huslia, United States		USGS
July 10, 1958	06:15	1958 Lituya Bay, Alaska earthquake and megatsunami	7.7	5	Fairweather Range (now United States)		USGS
November 6, 1958	22:58	1958 Kuril Islands earthquake	8.3		Kuril Islands (now Russia)		USGS
May 4, 1959	07:15	1959 Kamchatka earthquake	8.0	1	Kamchatka (now Russia)		
August 18, 1959	06:37	1959 Hebgen Lake earthquake	7.3	28	Hebgen Lake (Montana, United States)	(Dosier, 1985)	USGS
February 29, 1960	23:40	1960 Agadir earthquake	5.7	10,000	Morocco		USGS
May 21, 1960	10:02	1960 Concepción earthquakes	8.3	125	Chile		USGS
May 22, 1960	19:11	1960 Valdivia earthquake	9.5	5,700	Chile		USGS
November 20, 1960	22:02 UTC	November 1960 Peru earthquake	7.8		Peru		USGS

== 1961–1970 ==
Date	Time	Event	Magnitude	Fatalities	Location	Comments	Sources
September 1, 1962	19:20	1962 Buin Zahra earthquake	7.2	12,225	Iran		USGS
February 13, 1963	08:50 UTC	1963 Su-ao earthquake	7.3	3	offshore Taiwan		
February 21, 1963	17:14		5.4 M_{s}	300	Marj, Libya		
July 26, 1963	04:17	1963 Skopje earthquake	6.1	1,100	Republic of Macedonia (now North Macedonia)		
October 13, 1963	05:17	1963 Kuril Islands earthquake	8.5		Kuril Islands (now Russia)		
March 27, 1964	17:36	1964 Alaska earthquake	9.2	125	United States		USGS
June 16, 1964	04:01	1964 Niigata earthquake	7.5	26	Japan		USGS
July 6, 1964	07:22 UTC	1964 Guerrero earthquake	7.4 M_{s}	40	Mexico		
October 6, 1964	16:31		7.0 M_{s}	23	Manyas, Turkey		
January 24, 1965	00:11 UTC	1965 Ceram Sea earthquake	8.2	71	Indonesia		
February 4, 1965	05:01	1965 Rat Islands earthquake	8.7		Rat Islands (now United States)		USGS
March 28, 1965	12:33	1965 La Ligua earthquake	7.4	280	Chile		USGS
April 29, 1965	08:29	1965 Puget Sound earthquake	6.7	7	United States		USGS
August 23, 1965	19:46	1965 Oaxaca earthquake	7.5	6	Mexico		
March 12, 1966	16:31 UTC	1966 Hualien earthquake	8.0 M_{s}		offshore Taiwan		
March 20, 1966	01:42 UTC	1966 Toro earthquake	6.1 M_{s}	157	Uganda– Democratic Republic of the Congo		USGS
March 22, 1966	08:19	1966 Xingtai earthquakes	6.8	8,064	China		USGS
June 28, 1966	04:26		6.1		Parkfield, United States	(Tsai and Aki, 1969)	USGS
August 19, 1966	12:23	1966 Varto earthquake	6.8	2,396	Turkey		
October 17, 1966	21:41 UTC	1966 Peru earthquake	8.1		Peru		
December 28, 1966	08:18 UTC		8.1	6	Taltal, Chile		
July 22, 1967	16:56	1967 Mudurnu earthquake	7.2 M_{s}	89	Turkey		
July 29, 1967	20:05	1967 Caracas earthquake	6.6	236	Venezuela		USGS
December 10, 1967	22:51		6.3		Koynanagar, India	(Langston, 1976)	USGS
April 1, 1968	00:42 UTC	1968 Hyūga-nada earthquake	7.5		Hyūga-nada (now Japan)		
May 16, 1968	01:49 UTC	1968 Tokachi earthquake	8.3		Japan		USGS
May 24, 1968	5:24	1968 Inangahua earthquake	7.1	3	New Zealand		
August 31, 1968	10:47 UTC	1968 Dasht-e Bayaz and Ferdows earthquake	7.1	12,000	Iran		USGS
September 3, 1968	10:19 UTC		6.5 M_{s}	29	Bartın, Turkey		
October 14, 1968	10:49	1968 Meckering earthquake	6.5		Meckering, Australia		
February 28, 1969	02:40	1969 Portugal earthquake	7.8	13	Portugal– Morocco		
March 28, 1969	03:48		6.5 M_{s}	53	Alaşehir, Turkey		
March 31, 1969	07:15 UTC	1969 Sharm el-Sheikh earthquake	6.6	2	Egypt		
July 18, 1969	13:24	1969 Bohai earthquake	7.4 M_{s}	10	Bohai Bay (now China)		
July 25, 1969	22:49	1969 Yangjiang earthquake	6.4	3,000	China		
October 26–27, 1969	15:36 and 08:10		6.4 M_{s}	10	Banja Luka, Bosnia and Herzegovina		
January 4, 1970	17:35	1970 Tonghai earthquake	7.1	15,000	China		
March 24, 1970			6.7 M_{s}		Canning Basin, Australia		
May 31, 1970	20:23	1970 Ancash earthquake	7.9	70,000	Peru		USGS
March 28, 1970	23:02	1970 Gediz earthquake	7.2 M_{s}	1,086	Turkey		
July 31, 1970	17:08	1970 Colombia earthquake	8.0 M_{s}	1	Colombia		USGS
December 10, 1970	04:34 UTC	1970 Peru–Ecuador earthquake	7.1	82	Peru– Ecuador		USGS

== 1971–1980 ==
Date	Time	Event	Magnitude	Fatalities	Location	Comments	Sources
February 9, 1971	14:00	1971 San Fernando earthquake	6.7	65	United States	(Heaton, 1982)	USGS
May 22, 1971	16:44	1971 Bingöl earthquake	6.9	1,000	Turkey		
July 8, 1971	23:04	1971 Aconcagua earthquake	7.5	85	Chile		USGS
July 14, 1971 and July 26, 1971		1971 Solomon Islands earthquakes	8.0, 8.1	2	Solomon Islands		
July 16, 1971			6.4		Canning Basin, Australia		
April 10, 1972	02:06 UTC	1972 Qir earthquake	6.7	5,374	Iran		
April 24, 1972	09:57 UTC	1972 Ruisui earthquake	7.2 M_{s}	5	Taiwan		USGS
December 23, 1972	06:29	1972 Nicaragua earthquake	6.2	11,000	Nicaragua	(Brown, R. D., P. L. Ward, and G. Plafker (1973))	USGS
August 28, 1973	09:50	1973 Veracruz earthquake	7.3	1,200	Mexico		USGS
May 8, 1974	23:33	1974 Izu Peninsula earthquake	6.5 M_{s}	25	Izu Peninsula (now Japan)		
May 10, 1974	19:25	1974 Zhaotong earthquake	7.0	20,000	China		
October 3, 1974	14:21 UTC	1974 Lima earthquake	8.1	78	Peru		USGS
December 28, 1974	12:11	1974 Pattan earthquake	6.2	5,300	Pakistan		USGS
February 4, 1975	11:36	1975 Haicheng earthquake	7.0	2,041	China	(Cipar, 1979)	USGS
May 26, 1975	09:11 UTC	1975 North Atlantic earthquake	7.9		North Atlantic		USGS
June 30, 1975	18:54		6.1 M_{L}		Yellowstone National Park, United States	Largest earthquake in Yellowstone Caldera since 1959 Hebgen Lake event	
July 8, 1975	12:06 UTC	1975 Bagan earthquake	7.5	85	Myanmar		USGS
September 6, 1975	12:20	1975 Lice earthquake	6.6 M_{s}	2,385	Turkey		
November 29, 1975			6.2 M_{s}		Canning Basin, Australia		
November 29, 1975	14:47		7.2 M_{s}	2	south flank of Kīlauea (Hawaii, United States)	(Klein and Wright, 2000)	USGS
February 4, 1976	09:01	1976 Guatemala earthquake	7.5	23,000	Guatemala		USGS
May 6, 1976	21:06	1976 Friuli earthquake	6.4	989	Friuli-Venezia Giulia (now Italy)		
June 25, 1976	19:18	1976 Papua earthquake	7.3	5,400	Papua (now Indonesia)		USGS
July 14, 1976	07:13	1976 Bali earthquake	6.5	573	Bali (now Indonesia)		USGS
July 27, 1976	19:42	1976 Tangshan earthquake	7.6	242,419	China		USGS
August 17, 1976	00:11	1976 Moro Gulf earthquake	8.0	4,791	Moro Gulf (now Philippines)		PHIVOLCS
November 24, 1976	14:22	1976 Çaldıran–Muradiye earthquake	7.5 M_{s}	3,840	Turkey		
March 4, 1977	21:20	1977 Bucharest earthquake	7.5	1,500	Romania	Lasted ~5 minutes	-
August 19, 1977	06:08	1977 Sumba earthquake	8.3	180	Sumba (now Indonesia)		USGS
November 23, 1977	09:26	1977 San Juan earthquake	7.4	65	Argentina		USGS
June 12, 1978	08:14 UTC	1978 Miyagi earthquake	7.7 M_{s}	28	Japan		USGS
September 16, 1978	19:38	1978 Tabas earthquake	7.7 M_{L}	15,000	Iran		USGS
April 15, 1979	06:19	1979 Montenegro earthquake	7.0 M_{s}	136	Montenegro– Croatia		
June 2, 1979			6.1		Cadoux, Australia		USGS
October 15, 1979	23:17	1979 Imperial Valley earthquake	6.4		Imperial Valley, United States	(Hartzell and Heaton, 1983)	USGS
December 12, 1979	07:59	1979 Tumaco earthquake	8.2	600	Colombia		
May 25, 1980	16:33		6.1		Mammoth Lakes, United States	(Ellsworth, 1990)	USGS
May 27, 1980	14:50		6.0		Mammoth Lakes, United States	(Ellsworth, 1990)	USGS
October 10, 1980	12:25	1980 El Asnam earthquake	7.7 M_{s}	5,000	Northern Algeria (now Algeria)		
October 24, 1980	14:53	1980 Oaxaca earthquake	7.2	300	Mexico		USGS
November 8, 1980	10:27		7.2		Gorda plate (California, United States)	(Ellsworth, 1990)	USGS
November 23, 1980	19:34	1980 Irpinia earthquake	6.8	2,735	Southern Italy (now Italy)		USGS

== 1981–1990 ==
Date	Time	Event	Magnitude	Fatalities	Location	Comments	Sources
January 19, 1981	15:11	1981 Irian Jaya earthquake	6.7 M_{s}	305	Irian Jaya (now Indonesia)		
January 23, 1981	21:13	1981 Dawu earthquake	6.8 M_{L}	150	China		USGS
October 25, 1981	03:22 UTC	1981 Playa Azul earthquake	7.3 M_{s}	3	Mexico		USGS
December 13, 1982	09:12	1982 North Yemen earthquake	6.2	2,800	North Yemen (now Yemen)		USGS
March 31, 1983		1983 Popayán earthquake	5.5	267	Colombia		USGS
May 2, 1983	23:42	1983 Coalinga earthquake	6.5		United States	(Ellsworth, 1990)	USGS
October 28, 1983	14:06		7.0	2	Borah Peak (Idaho, United States)	(PDE Monthly Listing)	USGS
October 30, 1983	07:12	1983 Erzurum earthquake	6.9 M_{s}	1,342	Turkey		
November 16, 1983	16:13		6.7		Kaoiki (Hawaii, United States)	(PDE Monthly Listing)	USGS
November 30, 1983	17:46 UTC	1983 Chagos Archipelago earthquake	7.7 M_{s}		Chagos Archipelago (British Indian Ocean Territory)		
December 22, 1983	04:11	1983 Guinea earthquake	6.3	500	Guinea		USGS
April 24, 1984	21:15	1984 Morgan Hill earthquake	6.2		United States	(PDE Monthly Listing)	USGS
November 17, 1984	06:49 UTC	1984 Northern Sumatra earthquake	7.2 M_{s}		Northern Sumatra (now Indonesia)		USGS
December 31, 1984	07:03	1984 Cachar earthquake	6.0	20	India		USGS
March 3, 1985	19:47	1985 Algarrobo earthquake	7.8	177	Chile		USGS
April 8, 1985	21:56:59	1985 Rapel Lake earthquake	7.5	2	Chile		USGS
September 19, 1985	13:17	1985 Mexico City earthquake	8.0	10,000	Mexico	(PDE Monthly Listing)	USGS
December 23, 1985	05:16	1985 Nahanni earthquakes	6.8		Northwest Territories (now Canada)	(Wetmiller et al., 1988)	USGS
May 7, 1986	22:47		8.0		Andreanof Islands (Alaska, United States)	(PDE Monthly Listing)	USGS
July 8, 1986	09:20		6.1		north Palm Springs, United States	(Hartzell, 1989)	USGS
July 21, 1986	14:42	1986 Chalfant Valley earthquake	6.2		United States	(Ellsworth, 1990)	USGS
October 10, 1986	17:49	1986 San Salvador earthquake	5.4 M_{s}	1,500	El Salvador		
March 2, 1987	13:42	1987 Edgecumbe earthquake	6.5		New Zealand		
March 6, 1987	04:10	1987 Ecuador earthquakes	7.1	5,000	Ecuador		USGS
October 1, 1987	14:42	1987 Whittier Narrows earthquake	5.9	8	United States	(Hartzell and Iida, 1990)	USGS
November 30, 1987	19:23		7.9		Gulf of Alaska (United States)	(PDE Monthly Listing)	USGS
January 22, 1988	00:35		6.3		Tennant Creek, Australia	(Choy and Bowman, 1990)	USGS
January 22, 1988	03:57		6.4		Tennant Creek, Australia	(Choy and Bowman, 1990)	USGS
January 22, 1988	12:04		6.6		Tennant Creek, Australia	(Choy and Bowman, 1990)	USGS
March 6, 1988	22:35		7.8		Gulf of Alaska (United States)	(PDE Monthly Listing)	USGS
August 20, 1988	23:09	1988 Nepal earthquake	6.9	709	Nepal		USGS
November 6, 1988	13:03	1988 Lancang earthquake	7.7	938	Myanmar– China		USGS
December 7, 1988	07:41	1988 Armenian earthquake	6.8	25,000	Armenia	(PDE Monthly Listing)	USGS
January 22, 1989	23:02	1989 Gissar earthquake	5.5	274	Tajikistan		USGS
May 23, 1989	10:54		8.2		Macquarie Fault Zone		
August 21, 1989	00:18	1989 West Papua earthquake	6.0	120	Papua (now Indonesia)		USGS
October 17, 1989	17:04	1989 Loma Prieta earthquake	6.9	63	United States	(Wald et al., 1991)	USGS
December 28, 1989	10:27	1989 Newcastle earthquake	5.6 M_{L}	13	Australia	This is the only deadly Australian earthquake recorded to date	
February 8, 1990	15:15	1990 Bohol Sea earthquake	6.8	6	Bohol Sea (now Philippines)		
June 14, 1990	15:41	1990 Panay earthquake	7.1	8	Panay Island (now Philippines)		
June 21, 1990	00:30	1990 Manjil–Rudbar earthquake	7.4	50,000	Northwestern Iran (now Iran)		
July 16, 1990	16:26	1990 Luzon earthquake	7.9 M_{s}	1,621	Philippines		

== 1991–2000 ==
Date	Time	Event	Magnitude	Fatalities	Location	Comments	Sources
April 29, 1991	09:12	1991 Racha earthquake	7.0	270	Georgia		USGS
August 17, 1991	22:17		7.1		Honeydew, United States	(PDE Monthly Listing)	USGS
October 20, 1991	02:53	1991 Uttarkashi earthquake	6.8	768	India	(PDE Monthly Listing)	USGS
March 13, 1992	17.18	1992 Erzincan earthquake	6.8	652	Turkey		
April 23, 1992	04:50		6.1		Joshua Tree, United States	(Hauksson et al., 1993)	USGS
April 25, 1992	18:06		7.2		Cape Mendocino, United States	(PDE Monthly Listing)	USGS
April 26, 1992	07:41		6.5		offshore Cape Mendocino (United States)	(Oppenheimer et al., 1993)	USGS
April 26, 1992	11:18		6.7		offshore Cape Mendocino (United States)	(Oppenheimer et al., 1993)	USGS
June 28, 1992	11:57	1992 Landers earthquake	7.3	3	United States	(Sieh et al. 1993)	USGS
September 2, 1992	00:16	1992 Nicaragua earthquake	7.7	116	Nicaragua	(PDE Monthly Listing)	USGS
October 12, 1992	13:09	1992 Cairo earthquake	5.8 mb	545	Egypt		
December 12, 1992	05:29	1992 Flores earthquake and tsunami	7.8	2,500	Flores (now Indonesia)		USGS
July 12, 1993	13:17	1993 Hokkaido earthquake	7.7	230	Japan– Russia		
September 29, 1993	22:25	1993 Latur earthquake	6.2	9,748	India	(PDE Monthly Listing)	USGS
January 17, 1994	12:30	1994 Northridge earthquake	6.7	57	United States	(PDE Monthly Listing)	USGS
February 15, 1994	17:07 UTC	1994 Liwa earthquake	6.9	207	Sumatra (now Indonesia)		USGS
June 2, 1994	18:17	1994 Java earthquake	7.8	250	Java (now Indonesia)		USGS
June 6, 1994	20:47	1994 Páez River earthquake	6.8	1,100	Colombia		USGS
June 9, 1994	00:33	1994 Bolivia earthquake	8.2	5	Bolivia	(PDE Monthly Listing)	USGS
September 1, 1994	15:15		7.1		Cape Mendocino, United States	(PDE Monthly Listing)	USGS
October 4, 1994	13:22 UTC	1994 Kuril Islands earthquake	8.2	10	Russia		USGS
November 15, 1994	03:15	1994 Mindoro earthquake	7.1	78	Philippines		PHIVOLCS
December 28, 1994	12:19 UTC	1994 offshore Sanriku earthquake	7.7	2	Japan		USGS
January 17, 1995	05:46	Great Hanshin earthquake	6.9	6,434	Japan	(PDE Monthly Listing)	USGS
May 27, 1995	23:03	1995 Neftegorsk earthquake	7.1	1,995	Russia		USGS
July 30, 1995	05:11 UTC	1995 Antofagasta earthquake	8.0	3	Chile		USGS
September 14, 1995	14:04 UTC	1995 Guerrero earthquake	7.4	3	Mexico		USGS
October 1, 1995	17:57	1995 Dinar earthquake	6.1 M_{s}	90	Turkey		
October 9, 1995	15:35 UTC	1995 Colima–Jalisco earthquake	8.0	49	Colima–Jalisco, Mexico		
October 21, 1995	02:38 UTC	1995 Chiapas earthquake	7.1		Mexico		USGS
October 23, 1995	22:46 UTC	1995 Wuding earthquake	6.2	53	China		USGS
February 3, 1996	19:14	1996 Lijiang earthquake	6.6	322	China		USGS
February 17, 1996	05:59	1996 Biak earthquake	8.1	108	Indonesia		
May 3, 1996	03:32 UTC	1996 Baotou earthquake	6.4 M_{s}	26	China		
November 12, 1996	16:59 UTC	1996 Nazca earthquake	7.5	14	Peru		USGS
February 28, 1997	12:57 UTC	1997 Ardabil earthquake	6.1	1,100	Iran		USGS
May 10, 1997	07:57 UTC	1997 Qayen earthquake	7.3	1,567	Iran		USGS
May 22, 1997	22:51	1997 Jabalpur earthquake	5.8	56	India		USGS
July 9, 1997	19:24	1997 Cariaco earthquake	6.9	81	Venezuela		USGS
August 10, 1997			6.3		Collier Bay, Australia		USGS
September 26, 1997	09:40 UTC	1997 Umbria and Marche earthquake	6.1	11	Umbria–Marche, Italy		USGS
October 15, 1997	01:03 UTC	1997 Punitaqui earthquake	7.1	8	Chile		USGS
November 8, 1997	10:02 UTC	1997 Manyi earthquake	7.4		Tibet (now China)		USGS
January 30, 1998	12:16 UTC		7.1	1	Antofagasta, Chile		USGS
February 4, 1998	14:33	February 1998 Afghanistan earthquake	5.9	4,000	Afghanistan		USGS
May 22, 1998	00:48	1998 Aiquile earthquake	6.6	105	Bolivia		USGS
May 30, 1998	06:22	May 1998 Afghanistan earthquake	6.5	4,500	Afghanistan		USGS
June 27, 1998	16:55	1998 Adana–Ceyhan earthquake	6.2 M_{s}	146	Turkey		
July 17, 1998	08:49	1998 Papua New Guinea earthquake	7.0	2,183	Papua New Guinea	(PDE Monthly Listing)	USGS
November 19, 1998	11:38 UTC	1998 Ninglang earthquake	6.2 M_{s}	5	China		
January 25, 1999	13:19	1999 Colombia earthquake	6.2	1,900	Colombia		USGS
March 28, 1999	19:05	1999 Chamoli earthquake	6.8	103	India	(PDE Monthly Listing)	USGS
August 17, 1999	00:01 GMT	1999 İzmit earthquake	7.4	17,127	Turkey	(PDE Monthly Listing)	USGS
September 7, 1999	11:56	1999 Athens earthquake	6.0	143	Greece	(PDE Monthly Listing)	USGS
September 21, 1999	1:47	1999 Chichi earthquake	7.7	2,415	Taiwan	(PDE Monthly Listing)	USGS
October 16, 1999	09:46	Hector Mine	7.2		Hector Mine, United States	(PDE Monthly Listing)	USGS
November 12, 1999	16:57	1999 Düzce earthquake	7.2	894	Turkey	(PDE Monthly Listing)	USGS
January 14, 2000	23:37	2000 Yunnan earthquake	5.9	7	China		USGS
May 4, 2000	04:21	2000 Banggai Islands earthquake	7.6	46	Sulawesi (now Indonesia)		USGS
June 4, 2000	23:30	2000 Enggano earthquake	7.9	103	Sumatra (now Indonesia)		USGS
July 7, 2000	13:30	2000 Nicaragua earthquake	5.4	7	Nicaragua		
November 16, 2000	04:54	2000 New Ireland earthquakes	8.0	2	Papua New Guinea		USGS
November 25, 2000	18:10	2000 Baku earthquake	7.0 M_{L}	26	Azerbaijan		

Key to magnitudes
M_{L} = Local magnitude (Richter)
M_{S} = Surface-wave magnitude
M_{w} = Moment magnitude

== See also ==
- Lists of earthquakes
