= 1931 earthquake =

1931 earthquake may refer to:

- 1931 Hawke's Bay earthquake
- 1931 Dogger Bank earthquake
- 1931 Nicaragua earthquake

== See also ==
- List of earthquakes in 1931
