= 1919 New Guinea earthquake =

Earthquake

- Location within Papua New Guinea
- UTC time: 1919-05-06 19:41:13
- ISC event: 912783
- USGS-ANSS: ComCat
- Local date: 7 May 1919
- Local time: 05:41:13 AEST
- Magnitude: 8.2 M_{w}
- Depth: 35 km (22 mi)
- Epicenter: 4.806°S 153.859°E
- Max. intensity: MMI VII (Very strong)
- Tsunami: Yes

On 7 May 1919, at 05:41 AEST (19:41 UTC on 6 May), a M_{w} 8.2 earthquake struck Kokopo, German New Guinea, near the British Solomon Islands. After the earthquake, there was a tsunami at Rabaul.

== Impact ==
A few homes were damaged after the earthquake. Trees swayed, cracks appeared in the ground, and damage was done to structures. Wooden bungalows rocked in every direction; in the barracks, the rifles fell out of their piles. In the bungalows, the furniture shifted and many glass and glazed dishes were broken. The government press building was also completely destroyed.

== See also ==
- List of earthquakes in 1919
- List of earthquakes in Papua New Guinea
