= 1931 Oaxaca earthquake =

Earthquake in Mexico

- Location within Mexico
- UTC time: 1931-01-15 01:50:47
- ISC event: 906564
- USGS-ANSS: ComCat
- Local date: January 14, 1931
- Local time: 18:50:47 MST
- Magnitude: 8.0 M_{s}
- Depth: 40 km (25 mi)
- Epicenter: 16.037°N 96.583°W
- Type: Dip-slip
- Areas affected: Mexico
- Max. intensity: MMI X (Extreme)
- Casualties: 114

The 1931 Oaxaca earthquake affected portions of southern Mexico on January 14 at 18:50 MST. It registered a magnitude of 8.0 on the surface-wave magnitude scale and had a maximum perceived intensity of X (Extreme) on the Mercalli intensity scale.

== Tectonic setting ==
The state of Oaxaca lies above the convergent boundary where the Cocos plate is being subducted below the North American plate at a rate of 6.4 cm/yr. The dip of the subducting slab is about 15° as defined by focal mechanisms and earthquake hypocenters. Seismicity in this area is characterised by regular megathrust earthquakes along the plate interface. In addition, there have been a series of historical normal fault events within the subducting slab. The area affected by moderate seismic intensities is about four times greater for the normal fault events compared to those on the plate interface and the peak horizontal acceleration is also higher in most cases.

== Earthquake ==
The earthquake is characterized as a normal fault event, and was the strongest in that area since the 1911 Michoacán earthquake. It caused no surface ruptures and did not generate a tsunami. From limited seismographic data, it is inferred to have had a focal depth of about 40 km. Analysis indicates that the rupture occurred deep down-dip within the subducted lithospheric slab, possibly breaking through the entire thickness of the slab.

== Damage ==
Early reporting from the Los Angeles Times described the city of Oaxaca as being in ruins. Seventy per cent of its buildings were either completely destroyed or badly damaged. Messages were said to be fragmented coming over damaged communication systems as a result of telegraph lines having been knocked down. One message that did get through was from General Evaristo Perez, a military commander in the state of Oaxaca, to president Pascual Ortiz Rubio stating at least 25 persons were dead. Veracruz and Tampico reported light damage and one death was reported in Mexico city. The town of Miahuatlán de Porfirio Díaz, located between Oaxaca and the coast, was reported to be completely destroyed.

== Aftermath ==
Russian filmmaker Sergei Eisenstein, who was in Mexico working on a film, flew to Oaxaca shortly after the earthquake to film conditions in the affected area. After having returned to Mexico City, Eisenstein reported on the deaths of 71 persons in Guelatova while attending a fiesta in a church there. A total of 114 deaths were ultimately attributed to the earthquake.

Many people abandoned the city of Oaxaca after the earthquake and low property prices meant that a small number of families were able to gain ownership of most of the city. A magnitude 7.5 earthquake on September 30, 1999, had a hypocenter close to that of the 1931 earthquake.

== See also ==
- List of earthquakes in 1931
- List of earthquakes in Mexico
