= List of earthquakes in 1921 =

Earthquakes in 1921
Approximate epicenters of the earthquakes in 1921
- 4.0–5.9 magnitude
- 6.0–6.9 magnitude
- 7.0–7.9 magnitude
- 8.0+ magnitude
- Strongest magnitude: Afghanistan, Badakhshan Province November 15 (Magnitude 7.8)
- Deadliest: Italian Eritrea, off the coast of Massawa August 14 (Magnitude 5.9) 51+ deaths
- Total fatalities: 51+

Number by magnitude
- 9.0+: 0

This is a list of earthquakes in 1921. Only magnitude 6.0 or greater earthquakes appear on the list. Lower magnitude events are included if they have caused death, injury or damage. Events which occurred in remote areas will be excluded from the list as they wouldn't have generated significant media interest. All dates are listed according to UTC time. In a stark contrast to 1920, the death toll for this year was only 51. Dutch East Indies and Japan were very active.

== Overall ==
=== By death toll ===
Rank	Death toll	Magnitude	Location	MMI	Depth (km)	Date
1	51	5.9	Italian Eritrea, off the coast of Massawa	VIII (Severe)	0.0	August 14

- Note: At least 10 casualties

=== By magnitude ===
Rank	Magnitude	Death toll	Location	MMI	Depth (km)	Date
1	7.8	0	Afghanistan, Badakhshan Province	( )	240.0	November 15
2	7.6	0	Dutch East Indies, south of Java	( )	15.0	September 11
= 3	7.4	0	Tonga	( )	15.0	February 27
= 3	7.4	0	Japan, Ryukyu Islands	( )	35.0	July 4
= 3	7.4	0	Philippines, east of Mindanao	VII (Very strong)	15.0	November 11
= 4	7.3	0	Honduras, El Paraiso Department	( )	15.0	March 28
= 4	7.3	0	Peru, Loreto Region	( )	540.0	December 18
5	7.2	0	Chile, Tarapaca Region	( )	113.6	October 20
6	7.1	0	British Solomon Islands, Santa Cruz Islands	( )	35.0	October 15
= 7	7.0	0	Guatemala, Quiche Department	( )	15.0	February 4
= 7	7.0	0	Japan, Ryukyu Islands	( )	15.0	April 2
= 7	7.0	0	Japan, Ibaraki Prefecture, Honshu	( )	35.0	December 8

- Note: At least 7.0 magnitude

== Notable events ==
=== February ===
February
- Strongest magnitude: 7.4 M_{w} Tonga
- Total fatalities: 0

Number by magnitude
- 8.0–8.9: 0
- 7.0–7.9: 2
- 6.0–6.9: 2

Date	Country and location	M_{w}	Depth (km)	MMI	Notes	Casualties	
Date	Country and location	M_{w}	Depth (km)	MMI	Notes	Dead	Injured
4	Guatemala, Quiche Department	7.0	15.0				
19	Dutch East Indies, West Papua (province)	6.3	15.0				
19	Dutch East Indies, Papua (province)	6.9	25.0				
27	Tonga	7.4	15.0				

=== March ===
March
- Strongest magnitude: 7.3 M_{w} Honduras
- Total fatalities: 0

Number by magnitude
- 8.0–8.9: 0
- 7.0–7.9: 1
- 6.0–6.9: 5

Date	Country and location	M_{w}	Depth (km)	MMI	Notes	Casualties	
Date	Country and location	M_{w}	Depth (km)	MMI	Notes	Dead	Injured
3	Japan, off the east coast of Honshu	6.9	35.0				
5	India, Nicobar Islands	6.6	20.0				
23	Dutch East Indies, Banda Sea	6.0	50.0				
24	Russian SFSR, off the east coast of Kamchatka	6.6	25.0				
28	Honduras, El Paraiso Department	7.3	15.0				
30	Dutch East Indies, Barat Daya Islands	6.6	170.0				

=== April ===
April
- Strongest magnitude: 7.0 M_{w} Japan
- Total fatalities: 0

Number by magnitude
- 8.0–8.9: 0
- 7.0–7.9: 1
- 6.0–6.9: 3

Date	Country and location	M_{w}	Depth (km)	MMI	Notes	Casualties	
Date	Country and location	M_{w}	Depth (km)	MMI	Notes	Dead	Injured
1	Dutch East Indies, off the west coast of northern Sumatra	6.8	35.0				
1	British Solomon Islands, Santa Cruz Islands	6.5	35.0				
2	Japan, southwestern Ryukyu Islands	7.0	15.0				
10	Canada, west of Haida Gwaii	6.5	35.0				

=== May ===
May
- Strongest magnitude: 6.6 M_{w} Afghanistan
- Total fatalities: 0

Number by magnitude
- 8.0–8.9: 0
- 7.0–7.9: 0
- 6.0–6.9: 5

Date	Country and location	M_{w}	Depth (km)	MMI	Notes	Casualties	
Date	Country and location	M_{w}	Depth (km)	MMI	Notes	Dead	Injured
1	Mexico, off the coast of Colima	6.4	15.0				
12	New Guinea, Bougainville Island	6.4	35.0				
14	Dutch East Indies, Makassar Strait	6.2	0.0	VIII	A few homes were damaged or destroyed. Depth unknown.		
20	Afghanistan, Nuristan Province	6.6	35.0				
21	Philippines, northeast of Samar	6.4	35.0				

=== June ===
June
- Strongest magnitude: 6.7 M_{w} New Zealand
- Total fatalities: 0

Number by magnitude
- 8.0–8.9: 0
- 7.0–7.9: 0
- 6.0–6.9: 1

Date	Country and location	M_{w}	Depth (km)	MMI	Notes	Casualties	
Date	Country and location	M_{w}	Depth (km)	MMI	Notes	Dead	Injured
28	New Zealand, Hawke's Bay, North Island	6.7	25.0				

=== July ===
July
- Strongest magnitude: 7.4 M_{w} Japan
- Total fatalities: 0

Number by magnitude
- 8.0–8.9: 0
- 7.0–7.9: 1
- 6.0–6.9: 1

Date	Country and location	M_{w}	Depth (km)	MMI	Notes	Casualties	
Date	Country and location	M_{w}	Depth (km)	MMI	Notes	Dead	Injured
4	Japan, Ryukyu Islands	7.4	35.0				
15	Dutch East Indies, off the northeast coast of Halmahera	6.0	140.0				

=== August ===
August
- Strongest magnitude: 5.9 M_{w} Italian Eritrea
- Deadliest: 5.9 M_{w} Italian Eritrea; 51+ deaths
- Total fatalities: 51+

Number by magnitude
- 8.0–8.9: 0
- 7.0–7.9: 0
- 6.0–6.9: 0
- 5.0–5.9: 1

Date	Country and location	M_{w}	Depth (km)	MMI	Notes	Casualties	
Date	Country and location	M_{w}	Depth (km)	MMI	Notes	Dead	Injured
4	China, Liaoning Province	0.0	0.0		The magnitude, depth and location were unknown. A tsunami caused major flooding in the area. Some homes were destroyed.		
14	Italian Eritrea, off the coast of Massawa	5.9	0.0	VIII	The 1921 Massawa earthquake caused at least 51 deaths and major damage.	51+	

=== September ===
September
- Strongest magnitude: 7.6 M_{w} Dutch East Indies
- Total fatalities: 0

Number by magnitude
- 8.0–8.9: 0
- 7.0–7.9: 1
- 6.0–6.9: 1

Date	Country and location	M_{w}	Depth (km)	MMI	Notes	Casualties	
Date	Country and location	M_{w}	Depth (km)	MMI	Notes	Dead	Injured
11	Dutch East Indies, south of Java	7.6	15.0		Some light damage was reported on Java. A minor tsunami was reported.		
27	Japan, eastern Sea of Japan	6.5	5.0				

=== October ===
October
- Strongest magnitude: 7.2 M_{w} Chile
- Total fatalities: 0

Number by magnitude
- 8.0–8.9: 0
- 7.0–7.9: 2
- 6.0–6.9: 2

Date	Country and location	M_{w}	Depth (km)	MMI	Notes	Casualties	
Date	Country and location	M_{w}	Depth (km)	MMI	Notes	Dead	Injured
10	Dutch East Indies, Papua (province)	6.6	35.0	VII	Some damage was reported.		
12	British Solomon Islands, Kuril Islands	6.6	100.0				
15	British Solomon Islands, Santa Cruz Islands	7.1	35.0				
20	Chile, Tarapaca Region	7.2	113.6				

=== November ===
November
- Strongest magnitude: 7.8 M_{w} Afghanistan
- Total fatalities: 0

Number by magnitude
- 8.0–8.9: 0
- 7.0–7.9: 2
- 6.0–6.9: 2

Date	Country and location	M_{w}	Depth (km)	MMI	Notes	Casualties	
Date	Country and location	M_{w}	Depth (km)	MMI	Notes	Dead	Injured
7	Philippines, southeast of Mindanao	6.6	35.0	VIII	Some homes were damaged.		
11	Philippines, east of Mindanao	7.4	15.0	VII	A tsunami was reported. Some homes were damaged.		
13	Colombia, La Guajira Department	6.3	15.0				
15	Afghanistan, Badakhshan Province	7.8	240.0				

=== December ===
December
- Strongest magnitude: 7.3 M_{w} Peru
- Total fatalities: 0

Number by magnitude
- 8.0–8.9: 0
- 7.0–7.9: 2
- 6.0–6.9: 0

Date	Country and location	M_{w}	Depth (km)	MMI	Notes	Casualties	
Date	Country and location	M_{w}	Depth (km)	MMI	Notes	Dead	Injured
8	Japan, Ibaraki Prefecture, Honshu	7.0	35.0				
18	Peru, Loreto Region	7.3	540.0				
