= 1931 Fuyun earthquake =

Earthquake affecting China and Mongolia

- Location within Dzungaria
- UTC time: 1931-08-10 21:18:45
- ISC event: 906933
- USGS-ANSS: ComCat
- Local date: August 11, 1931
- Local time: 05:18:45
- Magnitude: M_{w} 8.0
- Depth: 20 km
- Epicenter: 46.8°N 89.9°E
- Max. intensity: MMI XI (Extreme)
- Casualties: 10,000 dead

The 1931 Fuyun earthquake (富蕴地震) occurred on August 10 at 21:18 UTC. The epicenter was near Fuyun County of northern Xinjiang, China. It had a moment magnitude (M_{w}) of 8.0 and had a surface rupture of 171 km with a maximum horizontal displacement of 14 m along the Koktokay-Ertai fault zone (可可托海-二台断裂带). The Koktokay-Ertai fault has a slip rate of 4±2 mm per year. The rupture of this earthquake was caused by right-lateral strike-slip movement with normal component. The rupture is well preserved and becomes one of the main features of the Koktokay National Geopark (可可托海国家地质公园) located in Koktokay.

== See also ==
- List of earthquakes in 1931
- List of earthquakes in China
