= 1903 Manzikert earthquake =

Earthquake in Muş Province, Turkey

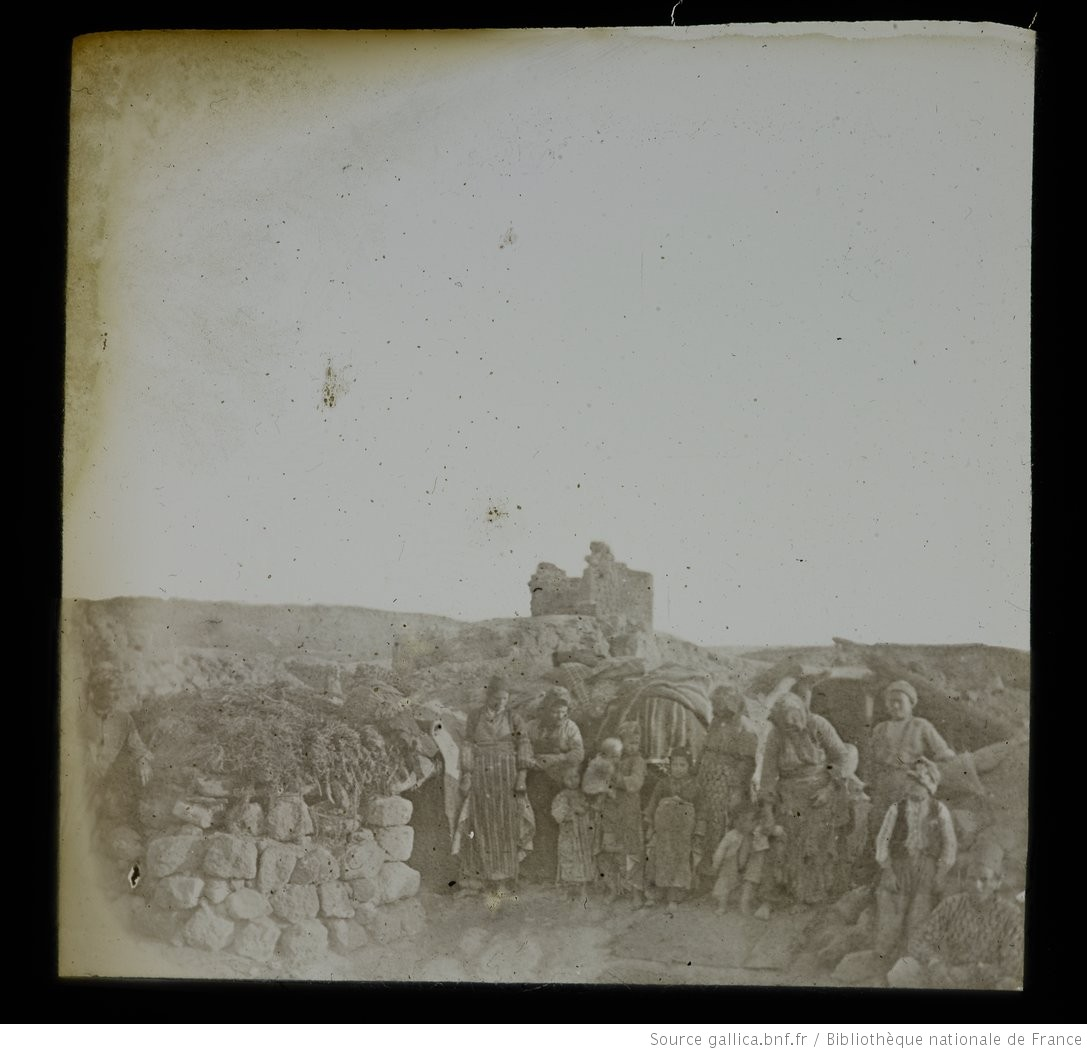
- Aftermath of the earthquake

- Location within Turkey
- UTC time: 1903-04-28 23:46:00
- ISC event: n/a
- USGS-ANSS: n/a
- Local date: 29 April 1903
- Local time: 01:30
- Magnitude: 7.0 (M_{s})
- Epicenter: 39.14°N 42.65°E
- Areas affected: Ottoman Empire (Turkey today)
- Total damage: 12,000 homes destroyed
- Max. intensity: MMI X (Extreme)
- Aftershocks: one
- Casualties: 3,500 humans and 20,000 livestock killed

The 1903 Manzikert earthquake struck Manzikert of nowadays Muş Province in eastern Turkey on 29 April (local time). Registering a surface-wave magnitude of 7.0, the earthquake originated from a highly active seismic zone. It killed 3,500 people and 20,000 animals, destroyed 12,000 homes, and is now listed among Turkey's deadliest earthquakes in recorded history. To this day, Turkey is threatened by major earthquakes – more than 100 earthquakes over 7.0 have taken place in the country's known history.

== Geology ==
Diagram of the major faults of Turkey.

The country of Turkey is situated on a highly active section of the Eurasian plate boundary. The country is mainly mountainous, approximately 85 percent of the country is at an elevation of 450 m (1,476 ft) or more. The entire country lies within a zone of active deformation known as the Alpide belt. This zone of continental collision reaches from the Atlantic Ocean to the Himalaya Mountains and beyond; dating back to the Paleogene period. It has formed due to convergent movement between the Arabian, African, and Indian continental plates and the Eurasian plate. The Anatolian Plate is currently being squeezed out to the west by the ongoing collision between the Arabian plate and the Eurasian plate, bounded to the southeast by the East Anatolian Fault and to the north by the North Anatolian Fault. To the east of the junction of these two faults, the Arabian plate is in direct collision with the Eurasian plate. This area is characterised by thrust faulting and was the area in which the 1903 event occurred.

== Damage and casualties ==
Among the world's deadliest earthquakes, it caused 3,500 direct fatalities. 12,000 homes were devastated. 20,000 animals (other than humans) were killed in the epicentral region of Manzikert-Patnos. Damage to a lesser extent reached Erzurum and Bitlis. On August 6, additional damage took place and people were injured when an aftershock rocked the same region.

== Threat ==
Major earthquakes have taken place in the region as early as 411 B.C. In the 20th century, 58 major destructive earthquakes took place – in total, they have killed more than 100,000 people, injured 150,000, and desolated approximately 420,000 homes and buildings. More than 100 earthquakes of magnitude 7 or greater have taken place in the country historically.

== See also ==
- List of earthquakes in 1903
- List of earthquakes in Turkey
