= 1931 Zangezur earthquake =

Earthquake in Armenia

- Location within Armenia
- UTC time: 1931-04-27 16:50:45
- ISC event: 906750
- USGS-ANSS: ComCat
- Local date: April 27, 1931
- Local time: 20:50:45
- Magnitude: 6.5 M_{w}
- Depth: 15 km (9.3 mi)
- Epicenter: 39.29°N 45.95°E
- Areas affected: Armenia; Azerbaijan
- Max. intensity: MSK-64 IX (Destructive)
- Casualties: 390–2,890 deaths

The 1931 Zangezur earthquake occurred on April 27 at 20:50:45 local time with a moment magnitude of 6.5. The earthquake was located in the Zangezur Mountains near the boundary between southwestern Armenia and Azerbaijan's exclave, the Nakhichivan Autonomous Republic. Both territories were part of the Soviet Union at that time.

== Tectonic setting ==
The Pambak-Sevan-Sunik Fault extends in the NW–SE direction. The fault can be traced continuously for 400 km and consists of four major segments. The 1931 Zangezur earthquake was located in the area of the Sunik-Zanghezour segment, which is about 120 km long. The fault was also the source of the magnitude 7.5+ 1139 Ganja earthquake; the largest and most destructive seismic event in the Caucasus.

== Earthquake ==
The earthquake was located near the border between the Syunik Province of Armenia (Zangezur is an alternative name for the region of Syunik Province) and the Nakhichivan Autonomous Republic of Azerbaijan. Up to 2,890 were reported dead. In Armenia, 57 villages were destroyed or heavily damaged in the Sisian-Goris area and in Azerbaijan, 46 villages were destroyed or seriously damaged in the Ordubad area. In another source it was reported that the earthquake destroyed 254 villages. In southeastern Armenia, the historical Tatev Monastery was damaged. The MSK-64 intensity reached IX (Destructive) in Shamb and VIII (Damaging) in Jougha. The Museum of History in Sisian has some photos taken after the town was hit by the earthquake.

== Previous seismicity ==
There was a period of increased earthquake activity in Armenia and its neighboring republics between 1911 and 1956 and the 1931 event was one of the strongest. It released about half of the total energy of all the earthquakes occurring in the Caucasus region near the Caspian Sea in that period.

== See also ==
- List of earthquakes in 1931
- List of earthquakes in Armenia
