= 1907 Qaratog earthquake =

Violent earthquake near the Uzbekistan-Tajikistan border

- Location within Tajikistan
- UTC time: 1907-10-21 04:23:43
- ISC event
- USGS-ANSS: ComCat
- Local date: 21 October 1907
- Local time: 10:23
- Magnitude: 7.4 M_{s}
- Depth: 35 km (22 mi)
- Epicenter: 38.5°N 67.9°E
- Areas affected: Tajikistan; Uzbekistan
- Total damage: US$200 million
- Max. intensity: MMI IX (Violent)
- Casualties: 12,000–15,000

The 1907 Qaratog earthquake occurred at 04:23 UTC on 21 October near Qaratog (Karatag) in the border area between Uzbekistan and Tajikistan, then part of the Russian Empire. The shock had an estimated surface-wave magnitude of 7.4 and a maximum felt intensity of IX (Violent) on the Mercalli intensity scale. Estimates of the death toll range between 12,000 and 15,000.

== See also ==
- List of earthquakes in 1907
- List of earthquakes in Tajikistan
