= 1919 Ayvalık earthquake =

Earthquake in Turkey

- Location within Turkey
- UTC time: 1919-11-18 21:54:41
- ISC event: 913005
- USGS-ANSS: ComCat
- Local date: November 19, 1919
- Local time: 00:54
- Magnitude: M_{w} 7.0
- Depth: 10 km (6.2 mi)
- Epicenter: 39.176°N 27.652°E
- Areas affected: Ottoman Empire
- Max. intensity: MMI IX (Violent)
- Casualties: 3,000 fatalities

The 1919 Ayvalık earthquake struck Balıkesir Province in the Ottoman Empire on 19 November. The earthquake had a moment magnitude of 7.0 and depth of 10 km (6.2 mi). Many homes, minarets and public buildings in Soma, Bergama, Ayvalık, Lesbos, Edremit and Balikesir were damaged or collapsed. An estimated 3,000 people were killed and 16,000 buildings were heavily damaged.

== See also ==
- List of earthquakes in 1919
- List of earthquakes in Turkey
