= 1931 Southwest Sumatra earthquake =

Earthquake in Indonesia

- Location within Sumatra
- UTC time: 1931-09-25 05:59:51
- ISC event: 907033
- USGS-ANSS: ComCat
- Local date: 25 September 1931
- Local time: 12:59
- Magnitude: 7.3 M_{w}
- Depth: 35 km (22 mi)
- Epicenter: 5.18°S 102.51°E
- Areas affected: Indonesia
- Max. intensity: IX (Destructive)
- Tsunami: 1 m

The 1931 Southwest Sumatra earthquake occurred on 25 September at 05:59 UTC. It was located between the Enggano Island and Sumatra, Indonesia, then under the rule of Dutch East Indies. It had a magnitude of M_{w} 7.3, or M_{s} 7.5.

The earthquake occurred off southwest Sumatra. Some huts were shifted by about 0.5 metre. The earthquake could be felt in Padang, more than 500 km away and in Bandung, about 600 km away. It was reported that the earthquake was even felt in Pamekasan, Madura Island, about 1250 km away. A tsunami of 1 metre high was reported.

== See also ==
- List of earthquakes in 1931
- List of earthquakes in Indonesia
