= List of earthquakes in 1907 =

Earthquakes in 1907
Approximate epicenters of the earthquakes in 1907
- 4.0–5.9 magnitude
- 6.0–6.9 magnitude
- 7.0–7.9 magnitude
- 8.0+ magnitude
- Strongest: 1 M > 8 event
- Deadliest: Russian Empire Districts of Republican Subordination, October 21 (Magnitude 7.4) 12,000 deaths
- Total fatalities: 13,568

Number by magnitude
- 9.0+: 0

This is a list of earthquakes in 1907. Only magnitude 6.0 or greater earthquakes appear on the list. Lower magnitude events are included if they have caused death, injury or damage. Events which occurred in remote areas will be excluded from the list as they wouldn't have generated significant media interest. All dates are listed according to UTC time. A fairly active year with 17 magnitude 7.0+ events. Tajikistan had 12,000 deaths from an event in October. 2,188 deaths occurred in Indonesia in January and Jamaica suffered from another January event which caused 1,000 deaths.

== Overall ==
=== By death toll ===
Rank	Death toll	Magnitude	Location	MMI	Depth (km)	Date
1	12,000	7.4	Russian Empire, Districts of Republican Subordination	IX (Violent)	20.0	October 21
2	2,188	8.2	Dutch East Indies, off west coast of northern Sumatra	V (Moderate)	0.0	January 4
3	1,000	6.5	Jamaica, Saint Mary Parish, Jamaica	( )	0.0	January 14
4	167	5.9	Italy, Calabria	X (Extreme)	33.0	October 23

- Note: At least 10 casualties

=== By magnitude ===
Rank	Magnitude	Death toll	Location	MMI	Depth (km)	Date
= 1	8.2	2,188	Dutch East Indies, off west coast of northern Sumatra	V (Moderate)	0.0	January 4
2	7.8	8	Mexico, Guerrero	( )	30.0	April 15
3	7.5	0	Dutch East Indies, Molucca Sea	( )	200.0	June 25
4	7.4	0	Russian Empire, Sea of Okhotsk	( )	600.0	May 25
4	7.4	12,000	Russian Empire, Districts of Republican Subordination	IX (Violent)	20.0	October 21
5	7.3	0	Tonga	( )	0.0	January 2
5	7.3	0	United States, Near Islands, Alaska	( )	0.0	September 2
6	7.2	0	Dutch East Indies, Celebes Sea	( )	500.0	March 29
6	7.2	0	Fiji	( )	400.0	March 31
6	7.2	0	Russian Empire, Kamchatka	( )	120.0	August 17
6	7.2	0	Mexico, Gulf of California	( )	0.0	October 16
6	7.2	0	Nicaragua, Managua	( )	0.0	December 30
7	7.1	2	(United States) Philippines, Luzon	IX (Violent)	0.0	April 18
8	7.0	0	German New Guinea, south of Umboi Island	( )	60.0	February 3
8	7.0	0	(United States) Philippines, Luzon	VII (Very strong)	0.0	April 18
8	7.0	0	Ecuador, off coast of Ecuador	( )	0.0	June 1
8	7.0	0	Ecuador, off coast of Ecuador	( )	0.0	June 5

- Note: At least 7.0 magnitude

== Notable events ==
=== January ===
January
- Strongest: 8.2 M_{w} Dutch East Indies
- Deadliest: 8.2 M_{w} Dutch East Indies; 2,188 deaths
- Total fatalities: 3,188

Number by magnitude
- 8.0–8.9: 1
- 7.0–7.9: 1
- 6.0–6.9: 1

Date	Country and location	M_{w}	Depth (km)	MMI	Notes	Casualties	
Date	Country and location	M_{w}	Depth (km)	MMI	Notes	Dead	Injured
2	Tonga	7.3	0.0		Depth unknown.		
4	Dutch East Indies, off the west coast of northern Sumatra	8.2	0.0	V	The 1907 Sumatra earthquake was a "tsunami earthquake" that produced low levels of shaking. However, it generated an Indian Ocean wide tsunami that caused 2,188 deaths.	2,188	
14	Jamaica, Saint Mary Parish, Jamaica	6.5	0.0		The 1907 Kingston earthquake left at least 1,000 people killed. Major property damage was caused. Costs were around $30 million (1907 rate). Depth unknown.	1,000	

=== February ===
February
- Strongest: 7.0 M_{w} German New Guinea
- Total fatalities: 0

Number by magnitude
- 8.0–8.9: 0
- 7.0–7.9: 1
- 6.0–6.9: 1

Date	Country and location	M_{w}	Depth (km)	MMI	Notes	Casualties	
Date	Country and location	M_{w}	Depth (km)	MMI	Notes	Dead	Injured
3	German New Guinea, south of Umboi Island	7.0	60.0				
6	Japan, Bonin Islands	6.9	400.0				

=== March ===
March
- Strongest: 7.2 M_{w} 2 events.
- Total fatalities: 0

Number by magnitude
- 8.0–8.9: 0
- 7.0–7.9: 2
- 6.0–6.9: 1

Date	Country and location	M_{w}	Depth (km)	MMI	Notes	Casualties	
Date	Country and location	M_{w}	Depth (km)	MMI	Notes	Dead	Injured
26	Japan, Sea of Japan	6.6	350.0				
29	Dutch East Indies, Celebes Sea	7.2	500.0				
31	Fiji	7.2	400.0				

=== April ===
April
- Strongest: 7.8 M_{w} Mexico
- Deadliest: 7.8 M_{w} Mexico; 8 deaths
- Total fatalities: 10

Number by magnitude
- 8.0–8.9: 0
- 7.0–7.9: 3
- 6.0–6.9: 1

Date	Country and location	M_{w}	Depth (km)	MMI	Notes	Casualties	
Date	Country and location	M_{w}	Depth (km)	MMI	Notes	Dead	Injured
13	Afghanistan, Badakhshan Province	6.8	260.0				
15	Mexico, Oaxaca	7.8	30.0		8 people were killed and many homes were destroyed.	8	
18	United States, Luzon	7.1	0.0	IX	2 people were killed and some were injured. Major damage was caused. Depth unknown.	2	1+
18	United States, Luzon	7.0	0.0	VII	Further damage was caused. Doublet earthquake Depth unknown.		

=== May ===
May
- Strongest: 7.4 M_{w} Russia
- Total fatalities: 0

Number by magnitude
- 8.0–8.9: 0
- 7.0–7.9: 1
- 6.0–6.9: 3

Date	Country and location	M_{w}	Depth (km)	MMI	Notes	Casualties	
Date	Country and location	M_{w}	Depth (km)	MMI	Notes	Dead	Injured
4	Japan, Bonin Islands	6.9	200.0				
4	German New Guinea, southeast of New Britain	6.6	25.0				
7	German New Guinea, Ninigo Islands	6.8	0.0		Depth unknown.		
25	Russian Empire, Sea of Okhotsk	7.4	600.0				
25	(United States) Philippines, Luzon	0.0	0.0	VIII	Some damage was caused. The magnitude and depth were unknown.		

=== June ===
June
- Strongest: 7.5 M_{w} Dutch East Indies
- Total fatalities: 0

Number by magnitude
- 8.0–8.9: 0
- 7.0–7.9: 3
- 6.0–6.9: 2

Date	Country and location	M_{w}	Depth (km)	MMI	Notes	Casualties	
Date	Country and location	M_{w}	Depth (km)	MMI	Notes	Dead	Injured
1	Ecuador, off the coast of	7.0	0.0		Depth unknown.		
5	Ecuador, off the coast of	7.0	0.0		Depth unknown.		
13	Chile, Los Rios Region	6.8	0.0		Depth unknown.		
25	Dutch East Indies, Molucca Sea	7.5	200.0				
27	Kiribati	6.8	0.0		Depth unknown.		

=== July ===
July
- Strongest: 6.8 M_{w} (United States) Philippines
- Total fatalities: 0

Number by magnitude
- 8.0–8.9: 0
- 7.0–7.9: 0
- 6.0–6.9: 3

Date	Country and location	M_{w}	Depth (km)	MMI	Notes	Casualties	
Date	Country and location	M_{w}	Depth (km)	MMI	Notes	Dead	Injured
5	Japan, Hokkaido	6.6	100.0				
9	(United States) Philippines, Luzon	6.8	60.0				
20	(United States) Philippines, Mindanao	6.8	0.0		Depth unknown.		
30	Dutch East Indies, Sulawesi	0.0	0.0	VIII	213 homes were destroyed. Magnitude and depth unknown.		

=== August ===
August
- Strongest: 7.2 M_{w} Russia
- Total fatalities: 0

Number by magnitude
- 8.0–8.9: 0
- 7.0–7.9: 1
- 6.0–6.9: 1

Date	Country and location	M_{w}	Depth (km)	MMI	Notes	Casualties	
Date	Country and location	M_{w}	Depth (km)	MMI	Notes	Dead	Injured
17	Russia, Kamchatka	7.2	120.0				
22	United States, Bristol Bay, Alaska	6.5	120.0				

=== September ===
September
- Strongest: 7.3 M_{w} United States
- Total fatalities: 0

Number by magnitude
- 8.0–8.9: 0
- 7.0–7.9: 1
- 6.0–6.9: 0

Date	Country and location	M_{w}	Depth (km)	MMI	Notes	Casualties	
Date	Country and location	M_{w}	Depth (km)	MMI	Notes	Dead	Injured
2	United States, Near Islands, Alaska	7.3	0.0		Depth unknown.		

=== October ===
October
- Strongest: 7.4 M_{w} (Russia) Russian Turkestan
- Deadliest: 7.4 M_{w} (Russia) Russian Turkestan; 12,000 deaths
- Total fatalities: 12,158

Number by magnitude
- 8.0–8.9: 0
- 7.0–7.9: 2
- 6.0–6.9: 1
- 5.0–5.9: 1

Date	Country and location	M_{w}	Depth (km)	MMI	Notes	Casualties	
Date	Country and location	M_{w}	Depth (km)	MMI	Notes	Dead	Injured
11	New Hebrides, Espiritu Santo	6.9	0.0		Depth unknown.		
16	Mexico, Gulf of California	7.2	0.0		Depth unknown.		
21	(Russia) Russian Turkestan, Districts of Republican Subordination	7.4	20.0	IX	12,000 deaths were caused as a result of the 1907 Qaratog earthquake. Many homes were destroyed.	12,000	
23	Italy, Calabria	5.9	33.0	X	158 deaths were caused. Major damage was reported.	158	

=== November ===
November
- Strongest: 6.8 M_{w} Dutch East Indies
- Total fatalities: 0

Number by magnitude
- 8.0–8.9: 0
- 7.0–7.9: 0
- 6.0–6.9: 1

Date	Country and location	M_{w}	Depth (km)	MMI	Notes	Casualties	
Date	Country and location	M_{w}	Depth (km)	MMI	Notes	Dead	Injured
21	Dutch East Indies, north of Sumatra	6.8	0.0		Depth unknown.		
24	Philippines, Luzon	0.0	0.0	IX	Some damage was caused. Magnitude and depth unknown.		

=== December ===
December
- Strongest: 7.2 M_{w} Nicaragua
- Total fatalities: 0

Number by magnitude
- 8.0–8.9: 0
- 7.0–7.9: 1
- 6.0–6.9: 4

Date	Country and location	M_{w}	Depth (km)	MMI	Notes	Casualties	
Date	Country and location	M_{w}	Depth (km)	MMI	Notes	Dead	Injured
2	Japan, off the east coast of Honshu	6.7	35.0				
15	German New Guinea, off the north coast of mainland New Guinea	6.9	0.0		Depth unknown.		
23	Japan, Hokkaido	6.7	150.0				
25	Afghanistan, Badakhshan Province	6.6	240.0				
30	Nicaragua, Managua	7.2	0.0		Depth unknown.		
