= 1931 Myitkyina earthquake =

Earthquake in Myanmar

- Location within Myanmar
- UTC time: 1931-01-27 20:09:19
- ISC event: 906595
- USGS-ANSS: ComCat
- Local date: January 28, 1931
- Local time: 02:39
- Magnitude: M_{w} 7.6
- Depth: 35 km (22 mi)
- Epicenter: 25.67°N 96.15°E
- Max. intensity: MMI IX (Violent)

The 1931 Myitkyina earthquake, or also known as the 1931 Kamaing earthquake, occurred on January 28 at 02:39 local time (20:09 on January 27 UTC). It was located in northern Burma, then part of British India. The magnitude of this earthquake was put at M_{w} 7.6. According to some sources the depth was 35 km, and according to a study of Phyo M. M. the depth was 5 to 30 km.

The shock was very violent and lasted at least 30 seconds. The intensity reached MMI IX. There were numerous fissures and cracks. Sand blows were reported. The earthquake may have been caused by slip along the Sagaing Fault. The Sagaing Fault is a continental transform fault between the India Plate and the Sunda plate. This earthquake is located along the northern Sagaing Fault. Sagaing Fault at 22° N is narrow, about 10 km wide. The part of Sagaing Fault between 25°30' and 26° is wider, with a shear zone about 70 km wide, and has four branches identified.

== See also ==
- List of earthquakes in 1931
