= List of earthquakes in 1903 =

Earthquakes in 1903
Approximate epicenters of the earthquakes in 1903
- 4.0–5.9 magnitude
- 6.0–6.9 magnitude
- 7.0–7.9 magnitude
- 8.0+ magnitude
- Strongest magnitude: Greece, Kythera (Magnitude 8.1) August 11
- Deadliest: Ottoman Empire, Mus Province (Magnitude 6.3) April 28 3,560 deaths
- Total fatalities: 3,913

Number by magnitude
- 9.0+: 0

This is a list of earthquakes in 1903. Only magnitude 6.0 or greater earthquakes appear on the list. Exceptions to this are earthquakes which have caused death, injury or damage. Events which occurred in remote areas will be excluded from the list as they wouldn't have generated significant media interest. All dates are listed according to UTC time. The countries and their flags are noted as they would have appeared in this year for example the Dutch East Indies being present-day Indonesia. A quieter year than normal but one with many deaths. The bulk of the deaths in this year came from a quake which struck Turkey in April. The largest event of the year was a magnitude 8.1 earthquake in Greece but this only caused two deaths.

== Overall ==
=== By death toll ===
| Rank | Death toll | Magnitude | Location | MMI | Depth (km) | Date |
|---|---|---|---|---|---|---|
| 1 | 3,560 | 6.3 | Ottoman Empire, Turkey, Mus Province | X (Extreme) | 0.0 | April 28 |
| 2 | 350 | 6.5 | Iran, Razavi Khorasan Province | ( ) | 0.0 | September 25 |

- Note: At least 10 casualties

=== By magnitude ===
| Rank | Magnitude | Death toll | Location | MMI | Depth (km) | Date |
|---|---|---|---|---|---|---|
| 1 | 8.1 | 2 | Greece, Kythera | XI (Extreme) | 80.0 | August 11 |
| 2 | 7.8 | 0 | Tonga | ( ) | 400.0 | January 4 |
| 3 | 7.7 | 0 | Mexico, off the coast of Oaxaca | ( ) | 0.0 | January 14 |
| 4 | 7.3 | 0 | Dutch East Indies, south of Java | ( ) | 0.0 | February 27 |
| = 5 | 7.1 | 0 | (Qing dynasty) , Mongolia, Zavkhan Province | ( ) | 0.0 | February 1 |
| = 5 | 7.1 | 0 | Tonga | ( ) | 0.0 | April 29 |
| = 5 | 7.1 | 0 | United States, Philippines, Mindanao | VIII (Severe) | 0.0 | December 28 |
| = 6 | 7.0 | 0 | United States, Andreanof Islands, Alaska | ( ) | 0.0 | January 17 |
| = 6 | 7.0 | 0 | United Kingdom, French Third Republic, New Hebrides | ( ) | 0.0 | May 13 |

- Note: At least 7.0 magnitude

== Notable events ==
=== January ===
January
- Strongest magnitude: 7.8 M_{w} Tonga
- Total fatalities: 0

Number by magnitude
- 8.0–8.9: 0
- 7.0–7.9: 3
- 6.0–6.9: 0

| Date | Country and location | M_{w} | Depth (km) | MMI | Notes | Casualties | |
| Date | Country and location | M_{w} | Depth (km) | MMI | Notes | Dead | Injured |
|---|---|---|---|---|---|---|---|
| 4 | Tonga | 7.8 | 400.0 | | | | |
| 14 | Mexico, off the coast of Oaxaca | 7.7 | 0.0 | VI | Depth unknown. | | |
| 17 | United States, Andreanof Islands, Alaska | 7.0 | 0.0 | | Depth unknown. | | |

=== February ===
February
- Strongest magnitude: 7.3 M_{w} Dutch East Indies
- Total fatalities: 0

Number by magnitude
- 8.0–8.9: 0
- 7.0–7.9: 2
- 6.0–6.9: 2

| Date | Country and location | M_{w} | Depth (km) | MMI | Notes | Casualties | |
| Date | Country and location | M_{w} | Depth (km) | MMI | Notes | Dead | Injured |
|---|---|---|---|---|---|---|---|
| 1 | (Qing dynasty) , Mongolia, Zavkhan Province | 7.1 | 0.0 | | Depth unknown. | | |
| 3 | Japan, off the south coast of Honshu | 6.5 | 100.0 | | | | |
| 5 | United States, Rat Islands, Alaska | 6.8 | 0.0 | | Depth unknown. | | |
| 10 | United States, Guam | 0.0 | 0.0 | VII | Magnitude and depth unknown. Some homes were damaged. | | |
| 27 | Dutch East Indies, south of Java | 7.3 | 0.0 | | Depth unknown. | | |

=== March ===
March
- Strongest magnitude: 6.5 M_{w} Dutch East Indies
- Total fatalities: 0

Number by magnitude
- 8.0–8.9: 0
- 7.0–7.9: 0
- 6.0–6.9: 1

| Date | Country and location | M_{w} | Depth (km) | MMI | Notes | Casualties | |
| Date | Country and location | M_{w} | Depth (km) | MMI | Notes | Dead | Injured |
|---|---|---|---|---|---|---|---|
| 30 | Dutch East Indies, Seram | 6.5 | 33.0 | | | | |

=== April ===
April
- Strongest magnitude: 7.1 M_{w} Tonga
- Deadliest: 6.3 M_{w} Ottoman Empire, 3,560 deaths
- Total fatalities: 3,560

Number by magnitude
- 8.0–8.9: 0
- 7.0–7.9: 1
- 6.0–6.9: 2

| Date | Country and location | M_{w} | Depth (km) | MMI | Notes | Casualties | |
| Date | Country and location | M_{w} | Depth (km) | MMI | Notes | Dead | Injured |
|---|---|---|---|---|---|---|---|
| 19 | Afghanistan, Badakhshan Province | 6.9 | 160.0 | | | | |
| 28 | Ottoman Empire, Mus Province | 6.3 | 0.0 | X | 3,560 deaths were caused by the 1903 Manzikert earthquake. At least 1,001 people were injured. Major damage was caused with over 12,000 homes collapsing. Depth unknown. | 3,560 | 1,001+ |
| 29 | Tonga | 7.1 | 0.0 | | Depth unknown. | | |

=== May ===
May
- Strongest magnitude: 7.0 M_{w} French Third Republic, United Kingdom, New Hebrides
- Total fatalities: 0

Number by magnitude
- 8.0–8.9: 0
- 7.0–7.9: 1
- 6.0–6.9: 0

| Date | Country and location | M_{w} | Depth (km) | MMI | Notes | Casualties | |
| Date | Country and location | M_{w} | Depth (km) | MMI | Notes | Dead | Injured |
|---|---|---|---|---|---|---|---|
| 13 | French Third Republic, United Kingdom, New Hebrides | 7.0 | 0.0 | | Depth unknown. | | |

=== June ===
June
- Strongest magnitude: 6.9 M_{w} United States
- Total fatalities: 0

Number by magnitude
- 8.0–8.9: 0
- 7.0–7.9: 0
- 6.0–6.9: 1

| Date | Country and location | M_{w} | Depth (km) | MMI | Notes | Casualties | |
| Date | Country and location | M_{w} | Depth (km) | MMI | Notes | Dead | Injured |
|---|---|---|---|---|---|---|---|
| 2 | United States, southern Alaska | 6.9 | 0.0 | | Depth unknown. | | |

=== August ===
August
- Strongest magnitude: 8.1 M_{w} Greece
- Deadliest: 8.1 M_{w} Greece; 2 deaths
- Total fatalities: 2

Number by magnitude
- 8.0–8.9: 1
- 7.0–7.9: 0
- 6.0–6.9: 0

| Date | Country and location | M_{w} | Depth (km) | MMI | Notes | Casualties | |
| Date | Country and location | M_{w} | Depth (km) | MMI | Notes | Dead | Injured |
|---|---|---|---|---|---|---|---|
| 11 | Greece, Kythera | 8.1 | 80.0 | XI | 2 people were killed and some damage was caused. | 2 | |

=== September ===
September
- Strongest magnitude: 6.5 M_{w} Iran
- Deadliest: 6.5 M_{w} Iran; 350 deaths
- Total fatalities: 350

Number by magnitude
- 8.0–8.9: 0
- 7.0–7.9: 0
- 6.0–6.9: 1

| Date | Country and location | M_{w} | Depth (km) | MMI | Notes | Casualties | |
| Date | Country and location | M_{w} | Depth (km) | MMI | Notes | Dead | Injured |
|---|---|---|---|---|---|---|---|
| 25 | Iran, Razavi Khorasan Province | 6.5 | 0.0 | | 350 people died. Depth unknown. | 350 | |

=== October ===
October
- Strongest magnitude: 6.9 M_{w} French Third Republic, United Kingdom, New Hebrides
- Total fatalities: 0

Number by magnitude
- 8.0–8.9: 0
- 7.0–7.9: 0
- 6.0–6.9: 2

| Date | Country and location | M_{w} | Depth (km) | MMI | Notes | Casualties | |
| Date | Country and location | M_{w} | Depth (km) | MMI | Notes | Dead | Injured |
|---|---|---|---|---|---|---|---|
| 29 | French Third Republic, United Kingdom, New Hebrides | 6.9 | 0.0 | | Depth unknown. | | |
| 30 | United Kingdom, Fiji | 6.8 | 0.0 | | Depth unknown. | | |

=== November ===
November
- Strongest magnitude: 6.7 M_{w} Russian Empire
- Total fatalities: 0

Number by magnitude
- 8.0–8.9: 0
- 7.0–7.9: 0
- 6.0–6.9: 1

| Date | Country and location | M_{w} | Depth (km) | MMI | Notes | Casualties | |
| Date | Country and location | M_{w} | Depth (km) | MMI | Notes | Dead | Injured |
|---|---|---|---|---|---|---|---|
| 26 | Russian Empire, Lake Baykal | 6.7 | 30.0 | | | | |

=== December ===
December
- Strongest magnitude: 7.1 M_{w} (United States) Philippines
- Deadliest: 6.8 M_{w} Chile; 1 death
- Total fatalities: 1

Number by magnitude
- 8.0–8.9: 0
- 7.0–7.9: 1
- 6.0–6.9: 2

| Date | Country and location | M_{w} | Depth (km) | MMI | Notes | Casualties | |
| Date | Country and location | M_{w} | Depth (km) | MMI | Notes | Dead | Injured |
|---|---|---|---|---|---|---|---|
| 7 | Chile, Atacama Region | 6.8 | 0.0 | VIII | 1 person died and some damage was reported. | 1 | |
| 23 | United Kingdom, Solomon Islands, Santa Cruz Islands | 6.8 | 0.0 | | Depth unknown | | |
| 28 | United States Philippines, east of Mindanao | 7.1 | 0.0 | VIII | Some damage was caused. Depth unknown. | | |
