= 1931 Nicaragua earthquake =

March 1931 earthquake in Nicaragua

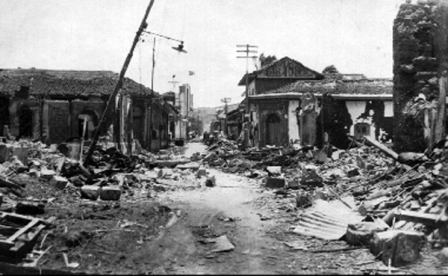
- Destruction caused by the earthquake

- Location within Central America
- UTC time: 1931-03-31 16:02:19
- ISC event: 906694
- USGS-ANSS: ComCat
- Local date: 31 March 1931
- Local time: 10:02
- Magnitude: 6.1 M_{w}
- Depth: 15 km (9.3 mi)
- Epicenter: Off the coast of Chinandega 12.57°N 87.45°W
- Areas affected: Nicaragua
- Total damage: $15–35 million
- Max. intensity: MSK-64 VI (Strong)
- Casualties: 1,000–2,450 deaths 45,000 displaced

The 1931 Nicaragua earthquake devastated Nicaragua's capital city of Managua on 31 March 1931. It had a moment magnitude of 6.1 and a maximum MSK intensity of VI (Strong). Between 1,000 and 2,450 people were killed. A major fire started and destroyed thousands of structures, burning into the next day. At least 45,000 were left homeless and losses of $35 million were recorded.

== Earthquake and aftermath ==
The earthquake hit Managua at 10:10 or 10:19 AM on 31 March, and caused cracks to spread throughout the western side of the city. East Managua was largely untouched. The main quake's duration was around 5 to 6 seconds. The quake was largely centered in Managua. Granada, Nicaragua, was unaffected.

The earthquake caused a large fire, which burned for five days, destroying 33 blocks in "the richest and most important area of the city". Around 10 square kilometres (3.9 sq mi) of the city were seriously damaged and a further 23 square kilometres (8.9 sq mi) saw "minor damage". All major government buildings in the city except for the National Bank of Nicaragua and most of the nation's archives were destroyed. The city, which at the time had a population of around 60,000 people, saw the vast majority—an estimated 35,000 or 45,000 left homeless. Ernest J. Swift, the director of relief efforts undertaken by the American Red Cross, estimated damage at around $15 million, though other estimates range as high as $30 or $35 million. The most deaths occurred in the city's penitentiary.

American marines and the Guardia Nacional immediately began working to restore order in Managua. American navy soldiers established a hospital while army soldiers fought the fire. Daniel I. Sultan, an American soldier who was leading the Nicaragua Canal Survey, organized a relief team of 34 soldiers, and was on an emergency committee for responding. He was charged with overseeing the restoration of railroads and water to the city, and chaired a food relief committee that provided 24,000 rations daily by April 24. The American Red Cross initially provided $10,000 towards relief, before increasing the amount to $100,000. People from Mexico and Panama, as well as other Central American countries, were sent to assist in relief and rebuilding efforts. America flew in medical supplies, working to prevent the outbreak of various diseases.

=== Rebuilding ===
In March 1932, The New York Times reported that "the Nicaraguan capital Is slowly emerging from ruins caused by 1931 earthquake". Rents fell by 40% in the year following the earthquake, and the city had slowly been rebuilding. Efforts were hampered by a lack of funding. The city was eventually rebuilt in the Spanish Colonial architecture style.

== See also ==
- List of earthquakes in 1931
- List of earthquakes in Nicaragua

== Bibliography ==
- Brodhead, Michael J. (2013). ""A Wet, Nasty Job": Army Engineers and the Nicaragua Canal Survey of 1929–1931" (PDF). Society for History in the Federal Government.
