= 1921 Massawa earthquake =

- Location within Eritrea
- UTC time: 1921-08-14 13:15:28
- ISC event: 912292
- USGS-ANSS: ComCat
- Local date: August 14, 1921
- Local time: 16:15:28
- Magnitude: 6.1 M_{w}
- Depth: 15 km (9 mi)
- Epicenter: 15.16°N 40.9°E
- Areas affected: Eritrea
- Total damage: Severe
- Max. intensity: MMI VIII (Severe)
- Casualties: Some

The 1921 Massawa earthquake took place off the coast of Massawa, Eritrea, on August 14 with a moment magnitude of 6.1 and a Mercalli intensity of VIII (Severe). The first aftershock after the initial earthquake was of similar magnitude. Significant damage was caused to the harbour at Massawa with a number of deaths reported. Aftershocks were felt as far away as Asmara and Dekemhare.

== See also ==
- List of earthquakes in Eritrea
