= 1931 Dogger Bank earthquake =

Earthquake in the North Sea in June 1931

- Location within England Location within the United Kingdom
- UTC time: 1931-06-07 00:25:13
- ISC event: 906812
- USGS-ANSS: ComCat
- Local date: 7 June 1931
- Local time: 01:30
- Magnitude: 6.1 M_{L}
- Epicentre: 54.08°N 1.50°E
- Areas affected: United Kingdom
- Max. intensity: MMI VII (Very strong)
- Tsunami: Yes
- Casualties: 1 dead (indirect)

The Dogger Bank earthquake of 1931 is the strongest earthquake recorded in the United Kingdom since measurements began. It had a magnitude of 6.1 on the Richter scale, and it caused a shaking intensity of VI (Strong) to VII (Very strong) on the Mercalli intensity scale. The location of the earthquake in the North Sea meant that damage was significantly less than it would have been had the epicentre been on the British mainland.

== Earthquake ==
The tremor began at around 1:30 am on 7 June 1931 with its epicentre located at the Dogger Bank, 60 miles (97 km) off the Yorkshire coast in the North Sea. The effects were felt throughout Great Britain as well as in Belgium and France. The earthquake resulted in damage at locations throughout eastern England. The coastal town of Filey in Yorkshire was worst hit, with the spire of a church being twisted by the tremor. Chimneys collapsed in Hull, Beverley and Bridlington, and parts of cliffs crumbled in Flamborough Head. It was also reported that a Hull woman died as a result of a heart attack caused by the quake. In London the head of the waxwork of Dr Crippen at Madame Tussauds fell off.

== Tsunami ==
A small nondestructive tsunami wave was reported to have hit the east coast of England and other countries around the North Sea.

== See also ==
- List of earthquakes in 1931
- List of earthquakes in the British Isles
