= List of earthquakes in 1919 =

Earthquakes in 1919
Approximate epicenters of the earthquakes in 1919
- 4.0–5.9 magnitude
- 6.0–6.9 magnitude
- 7.0–7.9 magnitude
- 8.0+ magnitude
- Strongest: New Guinea, May 6 (Magnitude 8.2)
- Deadliest: Turkey, Balıkesir Province November 18 (Magnitude 7.0) 3,000 deaths
- Total fatalities: 3000+

Number by magnitude
- 9.0+: 0

This is a list of earthquakes in 1919. Only magnitude 6.0 or greater earthquakes appear on the list. Lower magnitude events are included if they have caused death, injury or damage. Events which occurred in remote areas will be excluded from the list as they wouldn't have generated significant media interest. All dates are listed according to UTC time. The death toll for the year over 3,000. These were from the two earthquakes in Turkey and El Salvador. The southwest Pacific Ocean area saw some very large magnitude events. Clusters of activity were also found in Taiwan, the Philippines and Central America.

== Overall ==
=== By death toll ===
Rank	Death toll	Magnitude	Location	MMI	Depth (km)	Date
1	3,000	7.0	Turkey, Balıkesir Province	IX (Violent)	10.0	November 19
2	100	5.9	El Salvador, San Salvador	( )	0.0	April 28

- Note: At least 10 casualties

=== By magnitude ===
Rank	Magnitude	Death toll	Location	MMI	Depth (km)	Date
1	8.2	0	New Guinea, southeast of New Ireland (island)	( )	35.0	May 6
2	8.1	0	Tonga	( )	25.0	April 30
3	7.8	0	Fiji	( )	485.0	January 1
4	7.7	0	Japan, off the east coast of Honshu	( )	15.0	May 3
5	7.4	0	Taiwan, east of	( )	20.0	December 20
6	7.3	0	Chile, off the coast of Los Lagos Region	( )	15.0	March 2
= 7	7.2	0	Argentina, Chubut Province	( )	15.0	March 2
= 7	7.2	0	New Zealand, Kermadec Islands	( )	35.0	April 17
= 7	7.2	0	Philippines, off the southeast coast of Mindanao	( )	35	January 1
= 10	7.0	0	Tanganyika, Rukwa Region	( )	15.0	July 8
= 10	7.0	3,000	Turkey, Balikesir Province	( )	10.0	November 18
= 10	7.0	0	Dutch East Indies, northeast of Buru	( )	15.0	August 29
= 10	7.0	0	Guatemala, Retalhuleu Department	( )	35.0	April 17
= 10	7.0	0	Fiji	( )	214.6	August 18

- Note: At least 7.0 magnitude

== Notable events ==
=== January ===
January
- Strongest: 7.8 M_{w} Fiji
- Total fatalities: 0

Number by magnitude
- 8.0–8.9: 0
- 7.0–7.9: 2
- 6.0–6.9: 1

Date	Country and location	M_{w}	Depth (km)	MMI	Notes	Casualties	
Date	Country and location	M_{w}	Depth (km)	MMI	Notes	Dead	Injured
1	Philippines, off the southeast coast of Mindanao	7.2	35.0	VI			
1	Fiji	7.8	485.0				
18	Dutch East Indies, southwest of Sumatra	6.3	35.0				

=== March ===
March
- Strongest: 7.2 M_{w} 2 events
- Total fatalities: 0

Number by magnitude
- 8.0–8.9: 0
- 7.0–7.9: 2
- 6.0–6.9: 2

Date	Country and location	M_{w}	Depth (km)	MMI	Notes	Casualties	
Date	Country and location	M_{w}	Depth (km)	MMI	Notes	Dead	Injured
2	Chile, off the coast of Los Lagos Region	7.2	15.0				
2	Argentina, Chubut Province	7.2	15.0				
9	Chile, off the coast of Los Lagos Region	6.8	15.0		Aftershock.		
21	Philippines, Burias (island)	6.5	50.0				

=== April ===
April
- Strongest: 8.1 M_{w} Tonga
- Deadliest: 5.9 M_{w} El Salvador; 100+ deaths
- Total fatalities: 100+

Number by magnitude
- 8.0–8.9: 1
- 7.0–7.9: 2
- 6.0–6.9: 3
- 5.0–5.9: 1

Date	Country and location	M_{w}	Depth (km)	MMI	Notes	Casualties	
Date	Country and location	M_{w}	Depth (km)	MMI	Notes	Dead	Injured
2	Dutch East Indies, southern Sumatra	6.4	20.0				
17	New Zealand, Kermadec Islands	7.2	35.0				
17	Guatemala, Retalhuleu Department	7.0	35.0	VI			
27	Philippines, off the southwest coast of Mindoro	6.6	15.0	VIII	Some damage and landslides were caused.		
28	El Salvador, San Salvador	5.9	0.0		At least 100 deaths were reported. Many homes were damaged.	100+	
30	Tonga	8.1	25.0		Some minor damage was reported as well as a tsunami.		

=== May ===
May
- Strongest: 7.8 M_{w} New Guinea
- Total fatalities: 0

Number by magnitude
- 8.0–8.9: 0
- 7.0–7.9: 2
- 6.0–6.9: 2

Date	Country and location	M_{w}	Depth (km)	MMI	Notes	Casualties	
Date	Country and location	M_{w}	Depth (km)	MMI	Notes	Dead	Injured
1	Rhodesia, Eastern Province, Rhodesia	6.7	15.0				
3	Japan, off the east coast of Honshu	7.2	15.0				
6	New Guinea, southeast of New Ireland (island)	7.8	35.0		A few homes were damaged.		
23	Pakistan, Punjab, Pakistan	6.5	35.0				

=== June ===
June
- Strongest: 7.1 M_{w}
- Total fatalities: 0

Number by magnitude
- 8.0–8.9: 0
- 7.0–7.9: 1
- 6.0–6.9: 3

Date	Country and location	M_{w}	Depth (km)	MMI	Notes	Casualties	
Date	Country and location	M_{w}	Depth (km)	MMI	Notes	Dead	Injured
1	Taiwan, north of	7.1	35.0				
29	Italy, Tuscany	6.2	33.0	X			
29	El Salvador, off the coast of	6.6	20.0				
30	Ethiopia, SNNPR	6.5	15.0				

=== July ===
July
- Strongest: 7.2 M_{w} Tanganyika
- Total fatalities: 0

Number by magnitude
- 8.0–8.9: 0
- 7.0–7.9: 1
- 6.0–6.9: 3

Date	Country and location	M_{w}	Depth (km)	MMI	Notes	Casualties	
Date	Country and location	M_{w}	Depth (km)	MMI	Notes	Dead	Injured
8	Tanganyika, Rukwa Region	7.2	15.0				
11	Venezuela, Tachira	6.2	35.0				
22	Nicaragua, Chontales Department	6.5	150.0				
24	China, southern Xinjiang Province	6.5	20.0				

=== August ===
August
- Strongest: 7.0 M_{w} Fiji
- Total fatalities: 0

Number by magnitude
- 8.0–8.9: 0
- 7.0–7.9: 2
- 6.0–6.9: 2

Date	Country and location	M_{w}	Depth (km)	MMI	Notes	Casualties	
Date	Country and location	M_{w}	Depth (km)	MMI	Notes	Dead	Injured
3	Japan, off the east coast of Honshu	6.7	35.0				
18	Fiji	7.0	214.6				
29	Dutch East Indies, northeast of Buru	7.0	15.0	VI			
31	New Hebrides, eastern Espiritu Santo	6.8	35.0				

=== September ===
September
- Strongest: 6.6 M_{w} Philippines
- Total fatalities: 0

Number by magnitude
- 8.0–8.9: 0
- 7.0–7.9: 0
- 6.0–6.9: 2

Date	Country and location	M_{w}	Depth (km)	MMI	Notes	Casualties	
Date	Country and location	M_{w}	Depth (km)	MMI	Notes	Dead	Injured
6	United Kingdom, north of the British Virgin Islands	6.2	35.0				
26	Philippines, western Mindanao	6.6	35.0				

=== October ===
October
- Strongest: 6.9 M_{w} Fiji
- Total fatalities: 0

Number by magnitude
- 8.0–8.9: 0
- 7.0–7.9: 0
- 6.0–6.9: 4

Date	Country and location	M_{w}	Depth (km)	MMI	Notes	Casualties	
Date	Country and location	M_{w}	Depth (km)	MMI	Notes	Dead	Injured
3	Fiji, western Rabi Island	6.9	0.0	VIII	Some damage was reported. Depth unknown.		
11	Japan, Akita Prefecture, Honshu	6.2	35.0				
12	Dutch East Indies, off the southwest coast of Sumatra	6.5	25.0				
31	South Africa, northern Transvaal (present-day Limpopo)	6.5	35.0				

=== November ===
November
- Strongest: 7.0 M_{w} Turkey
- Deadliest: 7.0 M_{w} Turkey; 3,000 deaths
- Total fatalities: 3,000

Number by magnitude
- 8.0–8.9: 0
- 7.0–7.9: 0
- 6.0–6.9: 2

Date	Country and location	M_{w}	Depth (km)	MMI	Notes	Casualties	
Date	Country and location	M_{w}	Depth (km)	MMI	Notes	Dead	Injured
18	Turkey, Balıkesir Province	7.0	10.0	VII	The 1919 Ayvalık earthquake caused at least 3,000 fatalities and badly damaged 16,000 buildings.	3,000	
20	British Solomon Islands, Santa Cruz Islands	6.8	113.0				
21	Dutch East Indies, off the coast of Papua (province)	0.0	0.0	VIII	A few homes were destroyed. Magnitude and depth unknown.		

=== December ===
December
- Strongest: 7.1 M_{w} Taiwan
- Total fatalities: 0

Number by magnitude
- 8.0–8.9: 0
- 7.0–7.9: 1
- 6.0–6.9: 1

Date	Country and location	M_{w}	Depth (km)	MMI	Notes	Casualties	
Date	Country and location	M_{w}	Depth (km)	MMI	Notes	Dead	Injured
20	Taiwan, east of	7.1	35.0				
20	Taiwan, east of	6.9	20.0		Doublet earthquake.		
