= List of earthquakes in 1931 =

Earthquakes in 1931
Approximate epicenters of the earthquakes in 1931
- 4.0–5.9 magnitude
- 6.0–6.9 magnitude
- 7.0–7.9 magnitude
- 8.0+ magnitude
- Strongest: Two events reached magnitude 7.9.
- Deadliest: China, Xinjiang Province (Magnitude 7.9) August 10 10,000 deaths
- Total fatalities: 15,920

Number by magnitude
- 9.0+: 0

This is a list of earthquakes in 1931. Only magnitude 6.0 or greater earthquakes appear on the list. Lower magnitude events are included if they have caused deaths, injury or damage. Events which occurred in remote areas will be excluded from the list as they wouldn't have generated significant media interest. All dates are listed according to UTC time. In a stark contrast to 1930, many large and destructive earthquakes occurred during 1931. The largest and deadliest event was the magnitude 7.9 earthquake which caused major devastation to China in August. New Zealand saw its worst natural disaster in February. Iran and Nicaragua had many deaths from earthquakes in the first half of the year. Other interesting events happened in Texas and the United Kingdom with the largest quakes for these areas hitting this year.

== Overall ==
=== By death toll ===
Rank	Death toll	Magnitude	Location	MMI	Depth (km)	Date
1	10,000	7.9	China, Xinjiang Province	XI (Extreme)	10.0	August 10
2	2,890	6.5	Azerbaijan SSR, Nakhchivan Autonomous Republic	VIII (Severe)	15.0	April 27
3	2,450	5.6	Nicaragua, Managua City	VI (Strong)	0.0	March 31
4	256	7.4	New Zealand, Hawke's Bay, North Island	IX (Violent)	35.0	February 2
5	114	7.6	Mexico, Oaxaca	X (Extreme)	35.0	January 15
6	90	5.8	Albanian Kingdom, Korçë County	IX (Violent)	33.0	January 28
7	50	7.9	British Solomon Islands	( )	15.0	October 3
8	16	6.5	Japan, Saitama Prefecture, Honshu	( )	15.0	September 21

- Note: At least 10 casualties

=== By magnitude ===
Rank	Magnitude	Death toll	Location	MMI	Depth (km)	Date
= 1	7.9	10,000	China, Xinjiang Province	XI (Extreme)	10.0	August 10
= 1	7.9	50	British Solomon Islands	( )	15.0	October 3
2	7.8	0	Japan, off the east coast of Honshu	( )	35.0	March 9
3	7.7	0	British Solomon Islands	( )	15.0	October 10
= 4	7.6	114	Mexico, Oaxaca	X (Extreme)	35.0	January 15
= 4	7.6	0	British Burma, Kachin State	( )	15.0	January 27
5	7.5	1	Japan, east of Kyushu	( )	35.0	November 2
= 6	7.4	256	New Zealand, Hawke's Bay, North Island	IX (Violent)	35.0	February 2
= 6	7.4	0	Russian SFSR, Primorsky Krai	( )	356.7	February 20
= 6	7.4	0	Dutch East Indies, Enggano Island	VIII (Severe)	35.0	September 25
= 7	7.3	0	New Zealand, Manawatū-Whanganui	( )	45.0	February 13
= 7	7.3	0	Dutch East Indies, Banda Sea	( )	100.0	March 28
= 8	7.2	0	United States, south of Guam	( )	15.0	January 28
= 8	7.2	0	Chile, Valparaíso Region	( )	35.0	March 18
= 8	7.2	0	Pakistan, Baluchistan Province	( )	10.0	August 27
= 9	7.1	0	north Atlantic Ocean	( )	10.0	May 20
= 9	7.1	0	China, Xinjiang Province	( )	10.0	August 18
= 9	7.1	0	United States, Northern Mariana Islands	( )	167.8	September 9
= 10	7.0	0	Dutch East Indies, east of Enggano Island	( )	35.0	February 10
= 10	7.0	0	New Guinea, Sandaun Province	( )	35.0	August 7
= 10	7.0	0	British Solomon Islands	( )	15.0	October 3
= 10	7.0	0	British Solomon Islands	( )	15.0	October 3
= 10	7.0	0	British Solomon Islands, south of	( )	15.0	October 3

- Note: At least 7.0 magnitude

== Notable events ==
=== January ===
January
- Strongest: 7.6 M_{w} 2 events
- Deadliest: 7.6 M_{w} Mexico; 114 deaths
- Total fatalities: 204

Number by magnitude
- 8.0–8.9: 0
- 7.0–7.9: 3
- 6.0–6.9: 13
- 5.0–5.9: 1

Date	Country and location	M_{w}	Depth (km)	MMI	Notes	Casualties	
Date	Country and location	M_{w}	Depth (km)	MMI	Notes	Dead	Injured
1	Taiwan, east of	6.4	15.0				
2	Mexico, off the coast of Jalisco	6.7	20.0				
9	Japan, Akita Prefecture, Honshu	6.0	140.0				
12	Russian SFSR, off the east coast of Kamchatka	6.5	35.0				
15	Mexico, Oaxaca	7.6	35.0	X	The 1931 Oaxaca earthquake killing 114 people causing severe damage.	114	
15	Japan, northwest of the Ryukyu Islands	6.8	200.0				
15	New Guinea, Ninigo Islands	6.5	15.0				
16	Mexico, Oaxaca	6.3	30.0		Aftershock.		
17	Mexico, Gulf of California	6.7	10.0				
19	Dutch East Indies, north of Wetar	6.0	35.0				
20	Afghanistan, Badakhshan Province	6.5	220.0				
20	Dutch East Indies, Strait of Malacca	6.2	190.0				
21	Japan, off the southeast coast of Hokkaido	6.2	120.0				
24	Philippines, Siargao	6.2	35.0				
27	British Burma, Kachin State	7.6	15.0		1931 Myitkyina earthquake.		
28	Albanian Kingdom, Korçë County	5.8	33.0	IX	90 people were killed and some damage was caused.	90	
28	United States, south of Guam	7.2	15.0				

=== February ===
February
- Strongest: 7.4 M_{w} 2 events
- Deadliest: 7.4 M_{w} New Zealand; 256 deaths
- Total fatalities: 256

Number by magnitude
- 8.0–8.9: 0
- 7.0–7.9: 4
- 6.0–6.9: 8

Date	Country and location	M_{w}	Depth (km)	MMI	Notes	Casualties	
Date	Country and location	M_{w}	Depth (km)	MMI	Notes	Dead	Injured
2	New Zealand, Hawke's Bay, North Island	7.4	35.0	IX	The 1931 Hawke's Bay earthquake caused 256 deaths. 2 people were missing. Thousands of people were injured. Property damage costs were estimated at $900 million (2010 rates). This is currently the deadliest natural disaster to strike New Zealand as of 2019. Many aftershocks followed.	256	1,000+
8	New Zealand, off the east coast of North Island	6.4	15.0		Aftershock.		
10	Dutch East Indies, east of Enggano Island	7.0	35.0				
12	Dutch East Indies, east of Enggano Island	6.4	35.0		Aftershock.		
13	Taiwan, north of	6.0	35.0				
13	New Zealand, Manawatū-Whanganui, North Island	7.3	45.0		Doublet earthquake with previous event on February 2.		
14	Dutch East Indies, southern Sumatra	6.6	15.0		Aftershock.		
16	Japan, southern Hokkaido	6.3	25.0				
19	Dutch East Indies, northeast of Enggano Island	6.5	35.0		Aftershock.		
20	Russian SFSR, Primorsky Krai	7.4	365.0				
22	Dutch East Indies, Flores Sea	6.0	100.0				
27	Dutch East Indies, Molucca Sea	6.5	35.0				

=== March ===
March
- Strongest: 7.8 M_{w} Japan
- Deadliest: 5.6 M_{w} Nicaragua; 2,450 deaths
- Total fatalities: 2,450

Number by magnitude
- 8.0–8.9: 0
- 7.0–7.9: 3
- 6.0–6.9: 11
- 5.0–5.9: 1

Date	Country and location	M_{w}	Depth (km)	MMI	Notes	Casualties	
Date	Country and location	M_{w}	Depth (km)	MMI	Notes	Dead	Injured
1	Russian SFSR, south of Sakhalin	6.5	330.0				
2	France, southeast of the Loyalty Islands, New Caledonia	6.7	70.0				
5	Dutch East Indies, north of Simeulue	6.0	35.0				
7	Greece, Central Macedonia	6.0	35.0				
7	Nicaragua, Lake Nicaragua	6.0	80.0				
8	Yugoslavia, Southeastern Statistical Region	6.6	10.0	X			
9	Japan, off the east coast of Honshu	7.8	35.0				
11	Dutch East Indies, Banda Sea	6.0	35.0				
11	Japan, Volcano Islands	6.7	35.0				
18	Chile, Valparaíso Region	7.2	35.0				
18	Philippines, south of Mindanao	6.7	35.0				
19	Philippines, off the west coast of Luzon	6.7	15.0	IX	Some damage was reported.		
28	Dutch East Indies, Banda Sea	7.3	100.0				
29	Japan, Hokkaido	6.8	80.0				
31	Nicaragua, Jinotega Department	5.6	0.0		The 1931 Nicaragua earthquake caused major destruction in the area. 2,450 deaths were reported. Property damage costs were $15 million (1931 rate).	2,450	

=== April ===
April
- Strongest: 6.8 M_{w} Fiji
- Deadliest: 6.5 M_{w} Azerbaijan SSR; 2,890 deaths
- Total fatalities: 2,890

Number by magnitude
- 8.0–8.9: 0
- 7.0–7.9: 0
- 6.0–6.9: 9

Date	Country and location	M_{w}	Depth (km)	MMI	Notes	Casualties	
Date	Country and location	M_{w}	Depth (km)	MMI	Notes	Dead	Injured
2	Dutch East Indies, Banda Sea	6.0	130.0				
3	Peru, off the north coast	6.2	35.0				
3	Argentina, Tucumán Province	6.2	180.0				
3	Fiji, south of	6.8	630.0				
6	New Guinea, southwest of Bougainville Island	6.5	35.0				
8	Dutch East Indies, Papua (province)	6.0	35.0				
9	Russian SFSR, southern Kuril Islands	6.2	35.0				
24	New Guinea, southwest of Bougainville Island	6.7	15.0				
27	Azerbaijan SSR, Nakhchivan Autonomous Republic	6.5	15.0	VIII	The 1931 Zangezur earthquake caused major damage. 2,890 deaths were reported.	2,890	

=== May ===
May
- Strongest: 7.1 M_{w} north Atlantic Ocean
- Total fatalities: 0

Number by magnitude
- 8.0–8.9: 0
- 7.0–7.9: 1
- 6.0–6.9: 6

Date	Country and location	M_{w}	Depth (km)	MMI	Notes	Casualties	
Date	Country and location	M_{w}	Depth (km)	MMI	Notes	Dead	Injured
1	Venezuela, Barinas (state)	6.2	35.0				
12	Russian SFSR, Kamchatka Krai	6.5	50.0				
16	Mexico, Oaxaca	6.2	35.0				
20	north Atlantic Ocean	7.1	10.0				
20	Chile, off the coast of Atacama Region	6.2	35.0				
24	Philippines, Dinagat Islands	6.2	35.0				
28	Chile, off the coast of Tarapacá Region	6.5	120.0				

=== June ===
June
- Strongest: 6.5 M_{w} 4 events
- Total fatalities: 0

Number by magnitude
- 8.0–8.9: 0
- 7.0–7.9: 0
- 6.0–6.9: 11

Date	Country and location	M_{w}	Depth (km)	MMI	Notes	Casualties	
Date	Country and location	M_{w}	Depth (km)	MMI	Notes	Dead	Injured
1	New Guinea, East New Britain Province	6.2	35.0				
2	Japan, Gifu Prefecture, Honshu	6.5	260.0				
4	Dutch East Indies, Banda Sea	6.5	150.0				
7	United Kingdom, off the east coast of England	6.1	23.0	VIII	The 1931 Dogger Bank earthquake was one of the strongest recorded in the United Kingdom. Some damage was reported.		
9	Japan, off the east coast of Honshu	6.0	35.0				
15	Peru, Ica Region	6.0	35.0				
17	Japan, Tokyo, Honshu	6.0	35.0				
17	New Guinea, Morobe Province	6.5	140.0				
23	Japan, off the east coast of Honshu	6.4	25.0				
29	Japan, off the south coast of Honshu	6.5	380.0				
29	Chile, Coquimbo Region	6.0	35.0				

=== July ===
July
- Strongest: 6.8 M_{w} 2 events
- Total fatalities: 0

Number by magnitude
- 8.0–8.9: 0
- 7.0–7.9: 0
- 6.0–6.9: 9

Date	Country and location	M_{w}	Depth (km)	MMI	Notes	Casualties	
Date	Country and location	M_{w}	Depth (km)	MMI	Notes	Dead	Injured
11	Peru, Ucayali Region	6.2	120.0				
12	Philippines, northeast of Ticao Island	6.5	15.0				
15	Russian SFSR, Sea of Okhotsk	6.2	35.0				
17	Mexico, Oaxaca	6.2	35.0				
18	Chile, Antofagasta Region	6.8	110.0				
18	Russian SFSR, off the east coast of Kamchatka	6.3	15.0				
20	Western Samoa Trust Territory	6.5	80.0				
21	New Hebrides	6.2	55.0				
23	New Guinea, southern Bougainville Island	6.8	400.0				

=== August ===
August
- Strongest: 7.9 M_{w} China
- Deadliest: 7.9 M_{w} China; 10,000 deaths
- Total fatalities: 10,000

Number by magnitude
- 8.0–8.9: 0
- 7.0–7.9: 4
- 6.0–6.9: 5

Date	Country and location	M_{w}	Depth (km)	MMI	Notes	Casualties	
Date	Country and location	M_{w}	Depth (km)	MMI	Notes	Dead	Injured
2	Russian SFSR, Sea of Okhotsk	6.5	400.0				
6	Russian SFSR, Buryatia	6.0	35.0				
7	New Guinea, Sandaun Province	7.0	35.0				
10	China, Xinjiang Province	7.9	10.0	XI	10,000 people died in the 1931 Fuyun earthquake. Countless homes were destroyed in the area.	10,000	
15	Afghanistan, Badakhshan Province	6.0	240.0				
16	United States, southwestern Texas	6.5	10.0		The 1931 Valentine earthquake is the largest in Texas history.		
18	China, Xinjiang Province	7.1	10.0		Aftershock.		
24	Pakistan, Balochistan, Pakistan	6.8	10.0		Foreshock.		
27	Pakistan, Balochistan, Pakistan	7.2	10.0		Major damage was caused.		

=== September ===
September
- Strongest: 7.4 M_{w} Dutch East Indies
- Deadliest: 6.5 M_{w} Japan; 16 deaths
- Total fatalities: 16

Number by magnitude
- 8.0–8.9: 0
- 7.0–7.9: 2
- 6.0–6.9: 10

Date	Country and location	M_{w}	Depth (km)	MMI	Notes	Casualties	
Date	Country and location	M_{w}	Depth (km)	MMI	Notes	Dead	Injured
8	Japan, off the east coast of Honshu	6.2	35.0				
9	United States, Northern Mariana Islands	7.1	167.5				
12	Russian SFSR, Kamchatka Peninsula	6.0	35.0				
12	Colombia, off the west coast	6.2	35.0				
16	Japan, Yamanashi Prefecture, Honshu	6.0	35.0				
21	Japan, Saitama Prefecture, Honshu	6.5	15.0		16 people were killed and some damage was reported.	16	
21	South China Sea	6.7	25.0				
21	New Zealand, Gisborne Region, North Island	6.8	90.0				
25	Dutch East Indies, Enggano Island	7.4	35.0	VIII	Some damage was caused by the 1931 Southwest Sumatra earthquake.		
25	Dutch East Indies, northeast of Enggano Island	6.0	35.0		Aftershock.		
26	Guatemala, San Marcos Department	6.0	60.0				
29	Dutch East Indies, Molucca Sea	6.0	35.0				

=== October ===
October
- Strongest: 7.9 M_{w} British Solomon Islands
- Deadliest: 7.9 M_{w} British Solomon Islands; 50 deaths
- Total fatalities: 50

Number by magnitude
- 8.0–8.9: 0
- 7.0–7.9: 5
- 6.0–6.9: 10

Date	Country and location	M_{w}	Depth (km)	MMI	Notes	Casualties	
Date	Country and location	M_{w}	Depth (km)	MMI	Notes	Dead	Injured
1	Mexico, Gulf of California	6.0	35.0				
3	British Solomon Islands	7.9	15.0		The earthquake caused some damage however a destructive tsunami was triggered. The waves resulted in 50 deaths and many homes being destroyed. Several strong aftershocks followed.	50	
3	British Solomon Islands, south of	7.0	15.0		Aftershock.		
3	British Solomon Islands	7.0	15.0		Aftershock.		
3	British Solomon Islands	7.0	15.0		Aftershock.		
5	Afghanistan, Badakhshan Province	6.8	200.0				
10	British Solomon Islands	7.7	15.0		This was to the north of the October 3 event.		
10	British Solomon Islands	6.8	35.0		Aftershock.		
10	British Solomon Islands	6.8	15.0		Aftershock.		
10	British Solomon Islands	6.8	15.0		Aftershock.		
10	Russian SFSR, far northern Sea of Okhotsk	6.4	35.0				
12	Panama, off the south coast	6.0	35.0				
18	Fiji, south of	6.8	485.0				
28	Philippines, north of Luzon	6.2	25.0				
29	United States, Northern Mariana Islands	6.5	520.0				

=== November ===
November
- Strongest: 7.5 M_{w} Japan
- Deadliest: 7.5 M_{w} Japan; 1 death
- Total fatalities: 1

Number by magnitude
- 8.0–8.9: 0
- 7.0–7.9: 1
- 6.0–6.9: 6

Date	Country and location	M_{w}	Depth (km)	MMI	Notes	Casualties	
Date	Country and location	M_{w}	Depth (km)	MMI	Notes	Dead	Injured
1	Japan, east of Kyushu	6.5	35.0		Foreshock.		
2	Mexico, Oaxaca	6.6	35.0				
2	Japan, east of Kyushu	7.5	35.0		1 person died and 14 homes were destroyed.	1	
2	New Guinea, Gulf Province	6.5	15.0				
3	Japan, Iwate Prefecture, Honshu	6.0	35.0				
5	China, Xinjiang Province	6.4	10.0				
20	British Solomon Islands, Makira	6.7	15.0				
