= 1917 San Salvador earthquake =

1917 earthquake in Central America

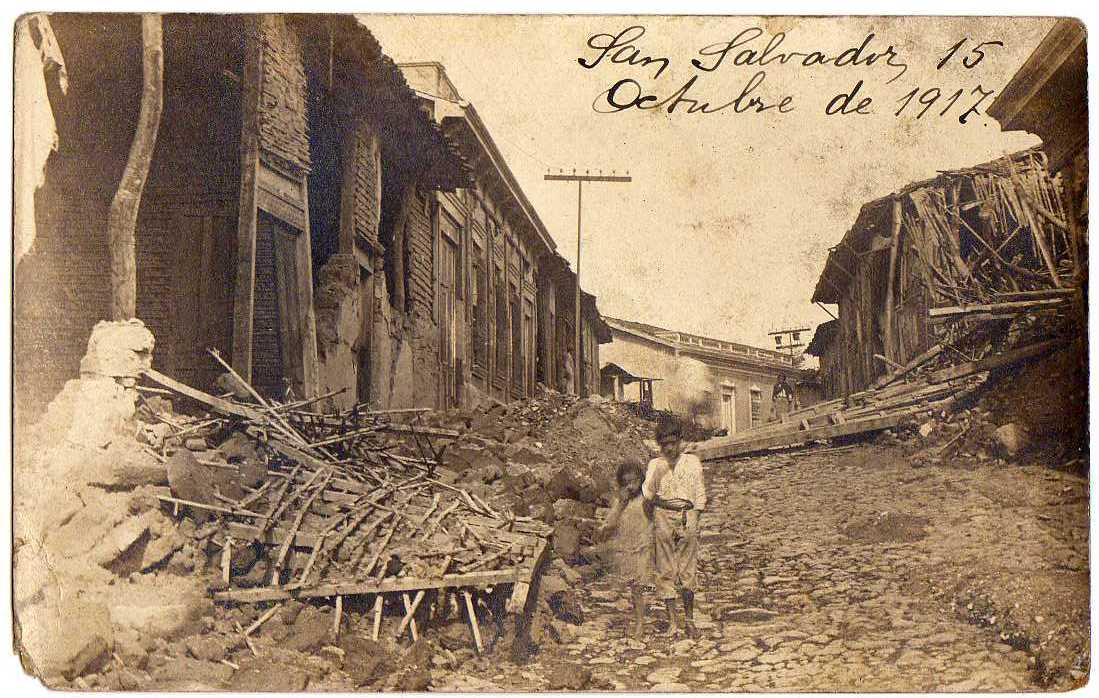
- Ruins of buildings in San Salvador

- UTC time: 1917-06-08 00:51:44
- ISC event: 913530
- USGS-ANSS: ComCat
- Local date: June 7, 1917
- Local time: 18:55 CST
- Magnitude: 6.7 M_{w}
- Depth: 15 km (9.3 mi)
- Epicenter: 13.802°N 89.361°W
- Type: Unknown
- Areas affected: La Libertad, San Salvador, and Sonsonate departments, El Salvador
- Max. intensity: MMI VIII (Severe)
- Aftershocks: 6.3 M_{s} on 6 June at 19:10
- Casualties: 1,050 killed

The 1917 San Salvador earthquake occurred on June 7 at 18:55 local time near the Salvadoran capital. The hypocenter of the M_{w} 6.7 (unknown type) shock was at a shallow depth of 15 km (9.3 mi), and occurred along a shallow crustal fault near San Salvador. Its maximum Mercalli intensity was VIII (Severe) and it caused significant destruction of the city and left approximately 1,050 dead. An aftershock of intensity VII (Very strong) was felt fifteen minutes later. The two shocks were followed roughly one hour later by an eruption on the San Salvador volcano that killed an unspecified number of people. A strong aftershock in 1919 killed a further 100 people in the same area. It is the second-deadliest earthquake in El Salvador, behind the 1986 San Salvador earthquake.

== Earthquake ==
There were two earthquakes felt in the San Salvador area on 6 June; one at 18:55 and 19:10. The largest earthquake was the first event, recorded at M_{w} 6.7, and centered about 20 to 30 km (12 to 19 mi) west of the San Salvador volcano. The latter event was a M_{s} 6.3 aftershock. Another M_{s} 6.0 aftershock in 1919 was centered around San Jacinto Hill, close to the epicenter of the 1986 shock. In isoseismal maps for the two 1917 shocks, seismologists Randall A. White and David H. Harlow indicated maximum Modified Mercalli intensities of VIII (Severe) and VII (Very strong), respectively.

=== Geology ===
Subduction of the Cocos Plate beneath the Caribbean Plate is associated with a volcanic arc that extends from Costa Rica to Guatemala. Because subduction occurs obliquely, arc-parallel right-lateral and east-west extensional faulting occurs within the overriding plate, coinciding with the volcanic zone as it is a zone of crustal weakness (shear zone). These earthquakes are generally related to tectonic faulting processes rather than the movement of magma. Some northeast-trending left-lateral faulting also occur when segments of the volcanic arc encounter a right-stepping offset as the deformation is transferred via these steps. Across the Central America Volcanic Arc, there are three major geological structures; the Nicaraguan depression, El Salvador Fault Zone and Jalpatagua Fault.

The El Salvador Fault Zone represents an area of geological strain with a dimension of 150 km (93 mi) by 20 km (12 mi). Earthquakes in the volcanic arc are concentrated within this region. It predominantly comprises east to southeast-striking strike-slip faults, though some southeast-striking normal faults also occur. These faults are active and individual segments were sources of the 13 February 2001 and 1917 earthquakes. Their displacement rates are estimated to be as high as 11 mm (0.43 in) per year and are capable of producing M_{w} 7.2 earthquakes. One of these faults, the Guaycume Fault, may have ruptured in the 1917 earthquake. The fault slips at a rate of 9 ± 3 mm (0.35 ± 0.12 in) per year, and is one of the most dangerous in El Salvador due to its proximity to San Salvador. Damage from the earthquake was mainly concentrated to the south of the fault while no major destruction was reported to its north. Near the fault, the districts of Nejapa, Opico and Quezaltepeque experienced the greatest impact. Modelling of peak ground acceleration from a simulated earthquake on the Guaycume Fault also indicated higher values to the south while lower values were predicted in the north.

These earthquakes in the upper crust occur more frequently that the larger subduction zone events offshore, although their magnitudes are considered moderate. The largest upper crust earthquakes in Central America were the 1976 Guatemala and 1991 Costa Rica earthquakes; both measured M_{s} 7.5. However, the largest earthquake within the volcanic range was the 1930 M_{s} 6.9 event in Guatemala. The volcanic arc earthquakes generally cause heavy damage for their moderate size due to their shallow depth and proximity to urban areas (1972 Managua, 1986 San Salador). Ground motion from these earthquakes are also amplified by the surface layer of unconsolidated volcanic material.

=== Impact ===
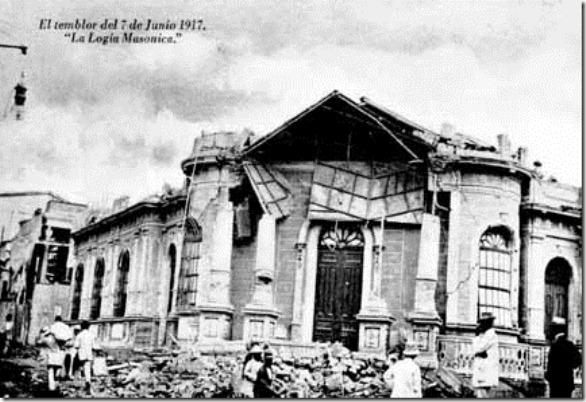
Damage to buildings

An area 30–40 km (19–25 mi) west of San Salvador volcano experienced the greatest damage from the initial earthquake. San Salvador and the region to the north, including around the volcano, were devastated by the aftershock. At least 1,050 people died and many were injured; several hundred deaths occurred in San Salvador. The towns of Santa Tecla, San Julián, Sacacoyo, Tepecoyo, Ateos, Caluco and San Vicente were also badly damaged. It was the deadliest earthquake in El Salvador until another earthquake struck San Salvador in 1986.

In the towns of Armenia and Quezaltepeque, 40 people were killed and over 100 were injured. Damage in San Salvador was severe; described as "80 out of every 100 homes" levelled. The business district of San Salvador was also incinerated by fires. Out of the 9,000 homes in San Salvador, only 200 remained standing. All government buildings with the exception of the national theater and palace withstood the earthquake. Hospitals, university buildings, schools, and other public buildings were razed. The National Palace, National Press building, President Residence and banks were also devastated. Surviving buildings eventually toppled during the large aftershock. In addition to damaged buildings, the local coffee plantations were ruined. The Colombian poet, Porfirio Barba-Jacob, experienced the earthquake and documented it in a book and the local newspaper Diario del Salvador.

The aftershock in 1919 also caused heavy damage and casualties in San Esteban, Cisneros, and Concepción districts of San Salvador. About 100 people died, 400 were injured and another 1,000 became homeless.

=== Volcanic eruption ===
The San Salvador volcano began to erupt at 20:11. Rated a 3 on the volcanic explosivity index, it was the volcano's largest eruption in nearly 250 years. The eruption was possibly triggered by the earthquakes disrupting plumbing within the magma chamber; beginning with a fissure vent forming on the northwest flank of the Boquerón cone in the volcano crater. The fissure later evolved into smaller craters, lava emerged and flowed in the direction of Sitio del Niño. The lava flow extended some 8 km (5.0 mi) along the northern slopes of San Salvador, and was accompanied by an eruption cloud. About 6 km (3.7 mi) north of the vent, the lava flows buried a section of railroad.

The eruption caused the Boquerón crater lake to evaporate and form a cinder cone in the crater called Boqueroncito—it ejected material up to 200 m (660 ft) high. The lava flows destroyed homes between Quezaltepeque and Sitio del Niño, and killed several people who were caught by it. By 11 June, the eruption had generally subsided, but the lava flows had affected a 16 km^{2} (6.2 sq mi) area, burying it under ʻaʻā (lava). Several craters formed and some continued to occasionally produce explosions. Two craters at the southern part of the fracture displayed fumarolic activity; one of these, El Tornador, located at 580–650 m (1,900–2,130 ft) in elevation, continued its Strombolian eruptions and erupt lava. Explosions on 28 and 29 June expelled volcanic material 200 m (660 ft) into the air. Localised earthquakes were also felt, while the eruptions continued until November. The 1917 earthquake sequence is one of two volcanic arc earthquakes in Central America associated with an eruption; the other was in 1912 at Izalco after a M_{s} 5.9 earthquake.

== See also ==
- List of earthquakes in 1917
- List of earthquakes in El Salvador
