= Payson D. Sheets =

American archaeologist

Payson Daniel Sheets (born 1944) is an American archaeologist, Mayanist, and professor of anthropology at the University of Colorado Boulder. He is primarily known for his research in Pre-Columbian Mesoamerica and Lower Central America, most importantly for his work on the Maya civilization at Joya de Cerén in El Salvador (although he has worked throughout the western United States, Canada, Panama, Guatemala, Costa Rica, and Nicaragua). He specializes in Mesoamerican archaeology, lithic technology, ancient adaptations, geophysical applications, hazards research (sudden environmental change – particularly volcanic eruptions), and remote sensing.

== Education ==
Sheets received his B.A. in 1967 and M.A. in 1969 at the University of Colorado Boulder and Ph.D. in 1974 at the University of Pennsylvania.

== Field work ==
His largest known body of research comes from the archaeology of the Maya site of Cerén, or Joya de Cerén, in the Zapotitan Valley of El Salvador which has been ongoing since its discovery in 1978. Cerén is known as the Pompeii of North America as it was preserved under hot volcanic ash from Loma Caldera's eruption around the year 600 and provides a snapshot in time of the everyday village life of the ancient Maya. Sheets is the primary archaeologist for the University of Colorado’s excavations at Cerén. He has also done extensive work at Arenal in Costa Rica (also covered in volcanic ash) where he used remote sensing technology (including infrared photography, LiDAR, thermal infrared spectroscopy, synthetic aperture radar data, and spectral bands from Landsat's Thematic Mapper) in a jungle environment, developing one of the largest remote sensing databases used for archaeology at the time.

Sheets has also worked in western United States, Canada, Panama, Guatemala, and Nicaragua.

== Major publications ==
- Sheets, Payson and Donald K. Grayson, eds. (1979) Volcanic Activity and Human Ecology. New York: Academic Press. Twenty chapters, 644 pages.
- Sheets, Payson, ed. (1983) Archeology and Volcanism in Central America: The Zapotitan Valley of El Salvador. Thirteen chapters. 6 appendices. Austin: University of Texas Press. 307 pages.
- Sheets, Payson (1992) The Ceren Site: A Prehistoric Village Buried by Volcanic Ash in Central America. Ft. Worth: Harcourt, Brace, Jovanovich. 150 pages.
- Sheets, Payson and Brian R. McKee, eds. (1994) Archaeology, Volcanism and Remote Sensing in the Arenal Region, Costa Rica. Austin: University of Texas Press. 350 pages.
- Sheets, Payson, ed. (2002) Before the Volcano Erupted: The Ancient Ceren Village in Central America. Austin: University of Texas Press. Twenty two chapters. 226 pages.
- Sheets, Payson (2006) The Ceren Site: An Ancient Village in Central America Buried by Volcanic Ash. Revised and expanded edition. Belmont, California: Wadsworth Publishing. 168 pages.

For a comprehensive list of publications see external links below.
