= List of earthquakes in 1917 =

Earthquakes in 1917
Approximate epicenters of the earthquakes in 1917
- 4.0–5.9 magnitude
- 6.0–6.9 magnitude
- 7.0–7.9 magnitude
- 8.0+ magnitude
- Strongest: Western Samoa Trust Territory, Samoa June 26 (Magnitude 8.5)
- Deadliest: Guatemala, Guatemala Department December 26 (Magnitude 6.0) 2,650 deaths
- Total fatalities: 6,221

Number by magnitude
- 9.0+: 0

This is a list of earthquakes in 1917. Only magnitude 6.0 or greater earthquakes appear on the list. Lower magnitude events are included if they have caused death, injury or damage. Events which occurred in remote areas will be excluded from the list as they wouldn't have generated significant media interest. All dates are listed according to UTC time. This year was marked by many earthquakes which caused deaths or damage across a number of countries.

== Overall ==
=== By death toll ===
Rank	Death toll	Magnitude	Location	MMI	Depth (km)	Date
1	2,650	6.0	Guatemala, Guatemala Department	( )	0.0	December 26
2	1,800	6.9	China, Sichuan Province	IX (Violent)	15.0	July 30
3	1,500	6.6	Dutch East Indies, Kangean Islands	IX (Violent)	0.0	January 20
= 4	101	6.3	China, Anhui Province	VIII (Severe)	20.0	January 24
= 4	101	6.7	El Salvador, La Libertad Department, El Salvador	( )	0.0	June 8
5	54	6.5	Taiwan, off south coast of Pingtung County	( )	0.0	January 4

- Note: At least 10 casualties

=== By magnitude ===
Rank	Magnitude	Death toll	Location	MMI	Depth (km)	Date
1	8.5	2	Western Samoa Trust Territory, southwest of Samoa	( )	15.0	June 26
2	8.2	0	New Zealand, Kermadec Islands	( )	15.0	May 1
3	8.0	0	Russia, off the east coast of Kamchatka	( )	20.0	January 30
= 4	7.5	0	New Zealand, Kermadec Islands	( )	35.0	November 16
= 4	7.5	0	New Guinea, Sandaun Province	( )	35.0	July 29
= 5	7.4	0	United States, south of the Alaska Peninsula	V (Moderate)	35.0	May 31
= 5	7.4	0	Sea of Japan	( )	500.0	July 31
= 6	7.3	0	Dutch East Indies, Barat Daya Islands	( )	100.0	August 30
= 7	7.2	0	Cuba, south of	( )	0.0	February 20
= 7	7.2	0	Taiwan, northeast of	( )	0.0	July 4
= 8	7.1	0	Afghanistan, Badakhshan Province	( )	220.0	April 21
= 8	7.1	6	Colombia, Meta Department	VIII (Severe)	0.0	August 31
= 8	7.1	0	Dutch East Indies, northern Sumatra	( )	0.0	November 4
= 9	7.0	0	Taiwan, northeast of	( )	0.0	July 4
= 9	7.0	0	Japan, off east coast of Honshu	( )	0.0	July 29

- Note: At least 7.0 magnitude

== Notable events ==
=== January ===
January
- Strongest: 8.0 M_{w} Russia
- Deadliest: 6.6 M_{w} Dutch East Indies; 1,500 deaths
- Total fatalities: 1,662+

Number by magnitude
- 8.0–8.9: 1
- 7.0–7.9: 0
- 6.0–6.9: 6

Date	Country and location	M_{w}	Depth (km)	MMI	Notes	Casualties	
Date	Country and location	M_{w}	Depth (km)	MMI	Notes	Dead	Injured
5	Taiwan, off the south coast of Pingtung County	6.5	0.0		54 people were killed and 85 were injured. 136 homes were destroyed. Part of the 1916–1917 Nantou earthquakes. Depth unknown.	54	85
6	Taiwan, off the southeast coast of Pingtung County	6.5	0.0		Depth unknown.		
20	Dutch East Indies, Kangean Islands	6.6	0.0	IX	The 1917 Bali earthquake caused 1,500 deaths. Landslides resulted in the destruction of many homes. Depth unknown.	1,500	
24	China, Anhui Province	6.3	20.0	VIII	At least 101 deaths were caused. Many homes were destroyed.	101+	
25	China, off the coast of Fujian Province	6.5	0.0		A tsunami was generated which damaged some fishing boats.		
30	Russia, Kamchatka	8.0	20.0				
31	Philippines, Mindanao	6.4	0.0	IX	A landslide caused 7 deaths. 2 people were injured. Some homes were destroyed. A tsunami was reported. Depth unknown.	7	2

=== February ===
February
- Strongest: 7.2 M_{w} Cuba
- Total fatalities: 0

Number by magnitude
- 8.0–8.9: 0
- 7.0–7.9: 1
- 6.0–6.9: 1

Date	Country and location	M_{w}	Depth (km)	MMI	Notes	Casualties	
Date	Country and location	M_{w}	Depth (km)	MMI	Notes	Dead	Injured
15	Chile, off the coast of Coquimbo Region	6.8	0.0		Depth unknown.		
20	Cuba, south of	7.2	0.0		Depth unknown.		

=== March ===
March
- Strongest: 6.9 M_{w} Japan
- Total fatalities: 0

Number by magnitude
- 8.0–8.9: 0
- 7.0–7.9: 0
- 6.0–6.9: 1

Date	Country and location	M_{w}	Depth (km)	MMI	Notes	Casualties	
Date	Country and location	M_{w}	Depth (km)	MMI	Notes	Dead	Injured
15	Japan, off the east coast of Honshu	6.9	0.0		Depth unknown.		

=== April ===
April
- Strongest: 7.1 M_{w} Afghanistan
- Total fatalities: 0

Number by magnitude
- 8.0–8.9: 0
- 7.0–7.9: 1
- 6.0–6.9: 1

Date	Country and location	M_{w}	Depth (km)	MMI	Notes	Casualties	
Date	Country and location	M_{w}	Depth (km)	MMI	Notes	Dead	Injured
21	Afghanistan, Badakhshan Province	7.1	220.0				
29	Russia, Buryatia	6.5	10.0				

=== May ===
May
- Strongest: 8.2 M_{w} New Zealand
- Total fatalities: 0

Number by magnitude
- 8.0–8.9: 1
- 7.0–7.9: 1
- 6.0–6.9: 0

Date	Country and location	M_{w}	Depth (km)	MMI	Notes	Casualties	
Date	Country and location	M_{w}	Depth (km)	MMI	Notes	Dead	Injured
1	New Zealand, Kermadec Islands	8.2	15.0				
31	United States, south of the Alaska Peninsula	7.4	35.0	V			

=== June ===
June
- Strongest: 8.5 M_{w} Western Samoa Trust Territory
- Deadliest: 6.7 M_{w} El Salvador; 101 deaths
- Total fatalities: 103+

Number by magnitude
- 8.0–8.9: 1
- 7.0–7.9: 0
- 6.0–6.9: 2

Date	Country and location	M_{w}	Depth (km)	MMI	Notes	Casualties	
Date	Country and location	M_{w}	Depth (km)	MMI	Notes	Dead	Injured
8	El Salvador, La Libertad Department (El Salvador)	6.7	0.0		At least 101 people were killed and major damage was caused by the 1917 San Salvador earthquake. Many homes were destroyed. Depth unknown.	101+	
24	Tonga	6.6	60.0				
26	Western Samoa Trust Territory	8.5	15.0		A tsunami was triggered by the 1917 Samoa earthquake. 2 people were killed. Many homes were destroyed. The earthquake caused some damage in its own right.	2	

=== July ===
July
- Strongest: 7.4 M_{w} 2 events
- Deadliest: 6.9 M_{w} China; 1,800 deaths
- Total fatalities: 1,800

Number by magnitude
- 8.0–8.9: 0
- 7.0–7.9: 5
- 6.0–6.9: 2

Date	Country and location	M_{w}	Depth (km)	MMI	Notes	Casualties	
Date	Country and location	M_{w}	Depth (km)	MMI	Notes	Dead	Injured
4	Taiwan, northeast of	7.2	0.0		Depth unknown.		
4	Taiwan, northeast of	7.0	0.0		Aftershock. Depth unknown.		
27	Argentina, San Juan Province, Argentina	6.9	60.0				
29	Japan, off the east coast of Honshu	7.0	0.0		Depth unknown.		
29	New Guinea, Sandaun Province	7.5	35.0				
30	China, Sichuan Province	6.9	15.0	IX	1,800 people were killed. Major destruction was caused in the area. Many homes were destroyed.	1,800	
31	Sea of Japan	7.4	500.0				

=== August ===
August
- Strongest: 7.3 M_{w} Dutch East Indies
- Deadliest: 7.1 M_{w} Colombia; 6 deaths
- Total fatalities: 6

Number by magnitude
- 8.0–8.9: 0
- 7.0–7.9: 2
- 6.0–6.9: 1

Date	Country and location	M_{w}	Depth (km)	MMI	Notes	Casualties	
Date	Country and location	M_{w}	Depth (km)	MMI	Notes	Dead	Injured
5	New Zealand, off the southeast coast of North Island	6.6	15.0				
30	Dutch East Indies, Barat Daya Islands	7.3	100.0				
31	Colombia, Meta Department	7.1	0.0	VIII	6 people were killed and 51 were injured. A few homes were destroyed. Depth unknown.	6	51+

=== November ===
November
- Strongest: 7.5 M_{w} New Zealand
- Total fatalities: 0

Number by magnitude
- 8.0–8.9: 0
- 7.0–7.9: 2
- 6.0–6.9: 0

Date	Country and location	M_{w}	Depth (km)	MMI	Notes	Casualties	
Date	Country and location	M_{w}	Depth (km)	MMI	Notes	Dead	Injured
4	Dutch East Indies, northern Sumatra	7.1	0.0		Depth unknown.		
16	New Zealand, Kermadec Islands	7.5	35.0		Depth unknown.		

=== December ===
December
- Strongest: 6.9 M_{w} Mexico
- Total fatalities: 2,650

Number by magnitude
- 8.0–8.9: 0
- 7.0–7.9: 0
- 6.0–6.9: 2

Date	Country and location	M_{w}	Depth (km)	MMI	Notes	Casualties	
Date	Country and location	M_{w}	Depth (km)	MMI	Notes	Dead	Injured
26	Guatemala, Guatemala Department	6.0	0.0		Further destructive events took place into January 1918. In total the series caused 2,650 deaths. Major damage was caused with Guatemala City being hardest hit. Depth unknown.	2,650	
29	Mexico, off the coast of Oaxaca	6.9	20.0				
