= List of earthquakes in 1916 =

Earthquakes in 1916
Approximate epicenters of the earthquakes in 1916
- 4.0–5.9 magnitude
- 6.0–6.9 magnitude
- 7.0–7.9 magnitude
- 8.0+ magnitude
- Strongest magnitude: New Guinea, east of New Britain January 1 (Magnitude 7.9)
- Deadliest: Taiwan, Changhua County August 28 (Magnitude 7.2) 180 deaths
- Total fatalities: 181

Number by magnitude
- 9.0+: 0

This is a list of earthquakes in 1916. Only magnitude 6.0 or greater earthquakes appear on the list. Lower magnitude events are included if they have caused death, injury or damage. Events which occurred in remote areas will be excluded from the list as they wouldn't have generated significant media interest. All dates are listed according to UTC time. Remarkably despite the large number of 7.0+ events the death toll for the year was only 181. Japan displayed many events and there were clusters of quakes in parts of Latin America.

== Overall ==
=== By death toll ===
Rank	Death toll	Magnitude	Location	MMI	Depth (km)	Date
1	180	7.2	Taiwan, Changhua County	VIII (Severe)	5.0	August 28

- Note: At least 10 casualties

=== By magnitude ===
Rank	Magnitude	Death toll	Location	MMI	Depth (km)	Date
1	7.9	0	New Guinea, east of New Britain	( )	35.0	January 1
2	7.7	0	Dutch East Indies, Papua (province)	( )	35.0	January 13
= 3	7.4	0	Japan, southeast of the Ryukyu Islands	( )	0.0	February 1
= 3	7.4	0	United States, Fox Islands (Alaska)	( )	170.0	April 18
= 3	7.4	0	Argentina, Santiago del Estero Province	( )	600.0	June 21
4	7.3	0	Russia, east of the Kuril Islands	( )	15.0	October 31
= 5	7.2	0	Nicaragua, off the west coast	( )	15.0	February 27
= 5	7.2	0	southern Indian Ocean	( )	0.0	April 7
= 5	7.2	0	Nicaragua, Rio San Juan Department	( )	0.0	April 24
= 5	7.2	180	Taiwan, Changhua County	VIII (Severe)	5.0	August 28
= 6	7.1	0	Dutch East Indies, Papua (province)	( )	25.0	January 13
= 6	7.1	0	Costa Rica, Gulf of Nicoya	IX (Violent)	0.0	April 26
= 6	7.1	0	Fiji	( )	600.0	July 8
= 6	7.1	0	New Guinea, East Sepik Province	( )	0.0	August 3
= 6	7.1	0	Dutch East Indies, south of Java	( )	100.0	September 11
= 6	7.1	0	Japan, off southeast coast of Honshu	( )	35.0	September 15
= 6	7.1	0	Peru, Ayacucho Region	( )	0.0	October 3
= 7	7.0	0	Ottoman Empire Sivas Province	( )	15.0	January 24
= 7	7.0	0	United States, Rat Islands, Alaska	( )	15.0	February 6
= 7	7.0	0	Japan, Izu Islands	( )	35.0	April 21
= 7	7.0	0	Mona Passage	IX (Violent)	80.0	April 24
= 7	7.0	0	Mexico, Veracruz	( )	150.0	June 2
= 7	7.0	0	Dutch East Indies, northern Sumatra	( )	100.0	July 27
= 7	7.0	0	Bolivia, Potosi Department	( )	180.0	August 25
= 7	7.0	0	Nepal, Mahakali Zone	( )	20.0	August 28

- Note: At least 7.0 magnitude

== Notable events ==
=== January ===
January
- Strongest magnitude: 7.9 M_{w} New Guinea
- Total fatalities: 0

Number by magnitude
- 8.0–8.9: 0
- 7.0–7.9: 4
- 6.0–6.9: 2

Date	Country and location	M_{w}	Depth (km)	MMI	Notes	Casualties	
Date	Country and location	M_{w}	Depth (km)	MMI	Notes	Dead	Injured
1	New Guinea, east of New Britain	7.9	35.0		Some homes were damaged or destroyed. A tsunami was observed.		
13	Dutch East Indies, Papua (province)	7.1	25.0				
13	Dutch East Indies, Papua (province)	7.7	35.0				
24	Turkey, Sivas Province	7.0	15.0				
25	Japan, northeast of Hokkaido	6.9	250.0				
26	Romania, Alba County	6.5	35.0				

=== February ===
February
- Strongest magnitude: 7.4 M_{w} Japan
- Total fatalities: 0

Number by magnitude
- 8.0–8.9: 0
- 7.0–7.9: 3
- 6.0–6.9: 1

Date	Country and location	M_{w}	Depth (km)	MMI	Notes	Casualties	
Date	Country and location	M_{w}	Depth (km)	MMI	Notes	Dead	Injured
1	Japan, southeast of the Ryukyu Islands	7.4	0.0		Depth unknown.		
6	Russia, Kuril Islands	6.7	35.0				
6	United States, Rat Islands, Alaska	7.0	15.0				
27	Nicaragua, off the west coast	7.2	15.0				
21	United States, Skyland, North Carolina	5.5	0.0		Depth unknown		

=== March ===
March
- Strongest magnitude: 6.6 M_{w} Japan
- Total fatalities: 0

Number by magnitude
- 8.0–8.9: 0
- 7.0–7.9: 0
- 6.0–6.9: 2

Date	Country and location	M_{w}	Depth (km)	MMI	Notes	Casualties	
Date	Country and location	M_{w}	Depth (km)	MMI	Notes	Dead	Injured
18	Japan, southeast of Hokkaido	6.6	35.0				
25	Japan, southwest Ryukyu Islands	6.5	0.0		Depth unknown.		

=== April ===
April
- Strongest magnitude: 7.4 M_{w} United States
- Total fatalities: 0

Number by magnitude
- 8.0–8.9: 0
- 7.0–7.9: 6
- 6.0–6.9: 2

Date	Country and location	M_{w}	Depth (km)	MMI	Notes	Casualties	
Date	Country and location	M_{w}	Depth (km)	MMI	Notes	Dead	Injured
7	southern Indian Ocean	7.2	0.0		Depth unknown.		
14	Japan, Izu Islands	6.6	35.0		Foreshock.		
18	United States, Fox Islands (Alaska)	7.4	170.0				
21	Japan, Izu Islands	7.0	35.0				
21	Afghanistan, Badakhshan Province	6.2	220.0				
24	Mona Passage	7.0	80.0	IX	Some damage was caused.		
24	Nicaragua, Rio San Juan Department	7.2	0.0		Depth unknown.		
26	Costa Rica, Gulf of Nicoya	7.1	0.0	IX	Damage costs of $25,000 (1916 rate) were reported. Depth unknown.		

=== June ===
June
- Strongest magnitude: 7.4 M_{w} Argentina
- Total fatalities: 0

Number by magnitude
- 8.0–8.9: 0
- 7.0–7.9: 2
- 6.0–6.9: 0

Date	Country and location	M_{w}	Depth (km)	MMI	Notes	Casualties	
Date	Country and location	M_{w}	Depth (km)	MMI	Notes	Dead	Injured
2	Mexico, Veracruz	7.0	150.0				
21	Argentina, Santiago del Estero Province	7.4	600.0				

=== July ===
July
- Strongest magnitude: 7.1 M_{w} Fiji
- Total fatalities: 0

Number by magnitude
- 8.0–8.9: 0
- 7.0–7.9: 2
- 6.0–6.9: 1
- 5.0–5.9: 1

Date	Country and location	M_{w}	Depth (km)	MMI	Notes	Casualties	
Date	Country and location	M_{w}	Depth (km)	MMI	Notes	Dead	Injured
3	Italy, Stromboli	5.1	0.0	VII	An eruption at Stromboli was in progress at the time. Some homes were damaged. Depth unknown.		
8	Fiji	7.1	600.0				
16	Japan, off the east coast of Honshu	6.8	35.0				
27	Dutch East Indies, northern Sumatra	7.0	100.0				

=== August ===
August
- Strongest magnitude: 7.2 M_{w} Taiwan
- Deadliest: 7.2 M_{w} Taiwan; 180 deaths
- Total fatalities: 180

Number by magnitude
- 8.0–8.9: 0
- 7.0–7.9: 4
- 6.0–6.9: 1

Date	Country and location	M_{w}	Depth (km)	MMI	Notes	Casualties	
Date	Country and location	M_{w}	Depth (km)	MMI	Notes	Dead	Injured
3	New Guinea, East Sepik Province	7.1	0.0		Depth unknown.		
25	Bolivia, Potosi Department	7.0	180.0				
27	Japan, off the east coast of Honshu	6.8	35.0				
28	Nepal, Mahakali Zone	7.0	20.0				
28	Taiwan, Changhua County	7.2	5.0	VIII	This was part of a series of earthquakes which struck Taiwan from August 1916 to January 1917. The death toll was put at 180. 614 homes were destroyed.	180	

=== September ===
September
- Strongest magnitude: 7.1 M_{w} 2 events
- Total fatalities: 0

Number by magnitude
- 8.0–8.9: 0
- 7.0–7.9: 2
- 6.0–6.9: 0

Date	Country and location	M_{w}	Depth (km)	MMI	Notes	Casualties	
Date	Country and location	M_{w}	Depth (km)	MMI	Notes	Dead	Injured
11	Dutch East Indies, south of Java	7.1	100.0		340 homes were destroyed.		
15	Japan, off the southeast coast of Honshu	7.1	35.0				

=== October ===
October
- Strongest magnitude: 7.3 M_{w} Russia
- Total fatalities: 0

Number by magnitude
- 8.0–8.9: 0
- 7.0–7.9: 2
- 6.0–6.9: 1
- 5.0–5.9: 1

Date	Country and location	M_{w}	Depth (km)	MMI	Notes	Casualties	
Date	Country and location	M_{w}	Depth (km)	MMI	Notes	Dead	Injured
3	Peru, Ayacucho Region	7.1	0.0		Depth unknown.		
18	Alabama, USA, Irondale	5.1	0.0		Largest Earthquake in Alabama history. Several chimneys damaged with the most severe damage in Irondale. Several wells in Pell City went dry as a result of the Earthquake. Depth unknown.	0	0?
28	Russia, Sea of Okhotsk	6.5	100.0				
31	Russia, east of the Kuril Islands	7.3	15.0				

=== November ===
November
- Strongest magnitude: 6.6 M_{w} 2 events
- Deadliest: 6.0 M_{w} Taiwan; 1 death
- Total fatalities: 1

Number by magnitude
- 8.0–8.9: 0
- 7.0–7.9: 0
- 6.0–6.9: 3

Date	Country and location	M_{w}	Depth (km)	MMI	Notes	Casualties	
Date	Country and location	M_{w}	Depth (km)	MMI	Notes	Dead	Injured
14	Taiwan, Nantou County	6.0	0.0		Part of the ongoing sequence in Taiwan. 1 person was killed and another 20 were injured. 97 homes were destroyed. Depth unknown.	1	20
24	Japan, off the east coast of Honshu	6.6	35.0				
30	Dominican Republic, Sanchez Ramirez Province	6.6	0.0		Depth unknown.		
