= Joya de Cerén =

Archaeological site in La Libertad Department, El Salvador

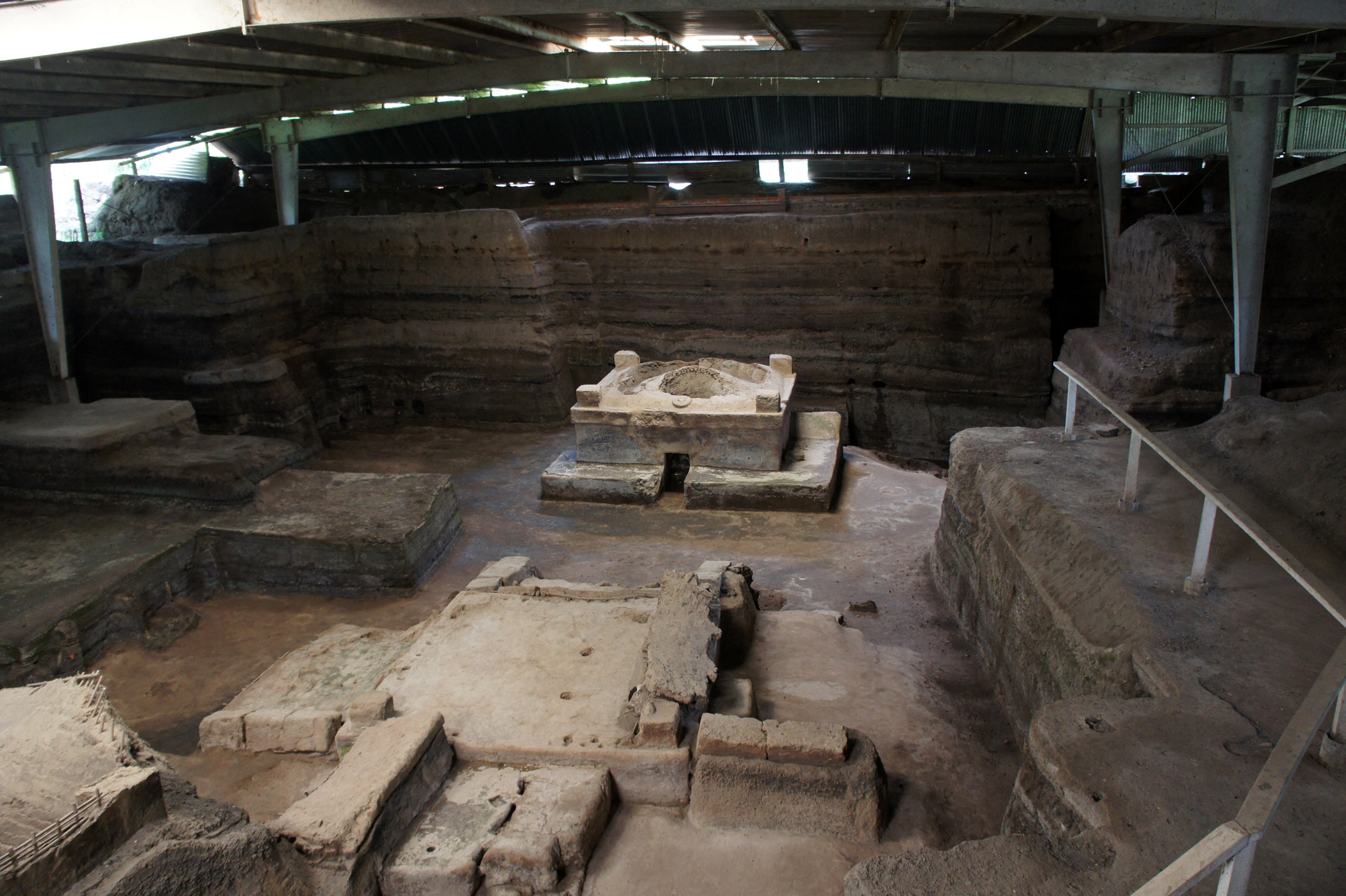
- Remains of the Maya village of Joya de Cerén, 2012

- Location of the site Joya de Cerén (El Salvador)
- 13°49′39″N 89°21′22″W
- Cultures: Maya civilization
- Location: La Libertad Department, El Salvador

UNESCO World Heritage Site
- Official name: Joya de Ceren Archaeological Site
- Type: Cultural
- Criteria: iii, iv
- Designated: 1993 (17th session)
- Reference no.: 675
- Region: Latin America and the Caribbean

Joya de Cerén (Jewel of Cerén in Spanish) is an archaeological site in La Libertad Department, El Salvador, containing the remains of a pre-Columbian Maya farming village. The site is located in the Zapotitán Valley, approximately 36 km (22 mi) northwest of San Salvador. It is often called the "Pompeii of the Americas", for its similar preservation beneath volcanic ash.

This site is notable for the exceptional preservation of a Classic period settlement, which was rapidly buried by ash from an eruption of the Loma Caldera around AD 600. The abundance of paleoethnobotanical remains has provided important insights into the daily life of ancient Maya agricultural communities. Among the most significant discoveries is a manioc field, the earliest known evidence of manioc cultivation at an archeological site in the New World. The site is thought to have been occupied between AD 200 and AD 600. Joya de Cerén was inscribed on the UNESCO World Heritage List in 1993 in recognition of its archeological significance and is a major tourist attraction in El Salvador.

== Abandonment of Joya de Cerén ==
The population of the village, around the time of its abandonment 1400 years ago, has been estimated to be 200 people. The eruption of the Loma Caldera volcano caused 10 meters of pyroclastic debris to settle over the site. The site was remarkably well preserved due to the low temperature of ash and very fast ashfall, a 4 - 8 meter thick layer having blanketed the town in the space of a few hours. The use of plaster casting by archaeologists similar to the one used in Pompeii assisted in their identification of fruiting plants, abundance of beans in storage, and mature maize to predict the eruption happened in August or September.

Guava, agave, cacao, and manioc were some of the major crops to the community. Based on crack patterns observed from the relatively earthquake-resistant wattle-and-daub walls and adobe columns at Joya de Cerén, scholars suggest that an earthquake measuring 4.0 on the Richter scale preceded the eruption, giving residents time to flee the site. Further, possible steamy emissions from the volcano may have alerted residents of the impending danger, but only inferences can be made about what exactly warned them. It is unclear to scholars if the duration of the eruptions lasted a few days or a few weeks. The position of artifacts at the site have led scholars to suggest that the evacuation of Joya de Cerén happened in the early evening: shovels and other agricultural work equipment were found stored near the domestic structures, and fires had been lit in hearths. Also, sleeping mats had not yet been rolled out on the domicile floor. No human remains have been discovered at the ancient Maya site.

== The Plaza ==
Joya de Cerén can be divided into a northeastern area, a southeastern area, and northwestern area. The northwestern area holds Household 1 alongside Structure 1, 5–6, 10–12, 17 containing milpas and a kitchen garden. The southeastern area holds Household 2 alongside Structure 2, 7, 9, 13, 18 containing a temascal, milpas and a basurero (trash pit). The northwestern area holds Household 3-4 alongside Structure 3–4, 8, 14-16 containing milpas, fruit trees, and another basurero. 18 structures have been identified in archaeological survey. Of these, ten have been excavated by archaeologists. Scholars distinguish ceremonial buildings from non-ceremonial buildings with the following considerations: orientation of building, platform heights, floor plans, assemblages, construction technique, altars, caches, burials, etc.

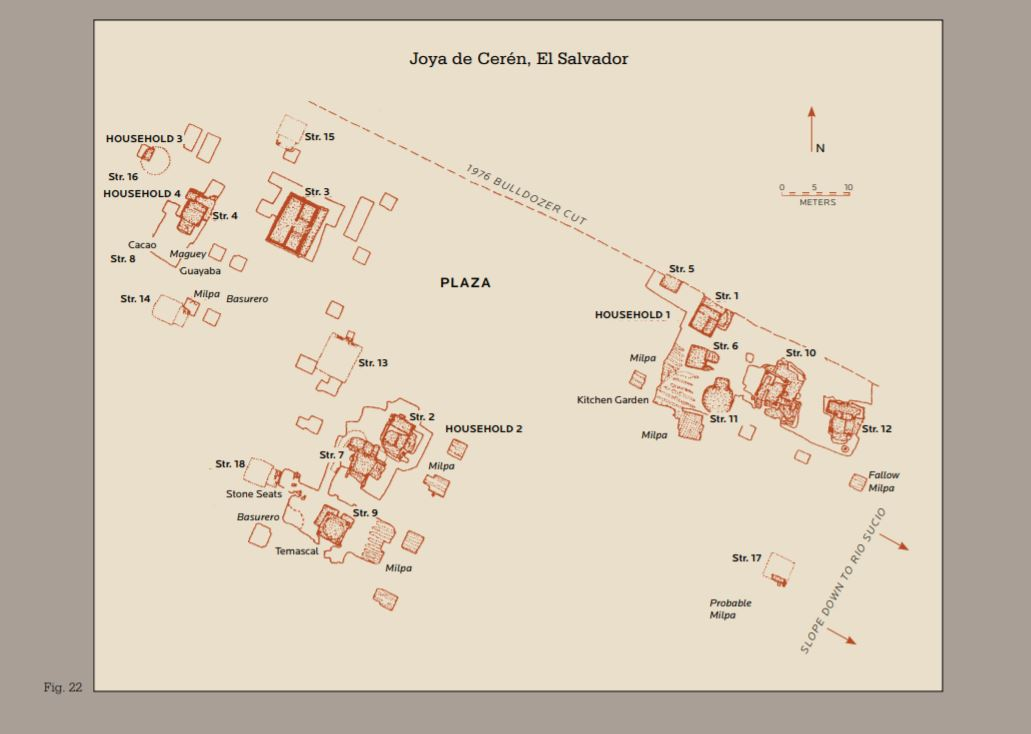
The Plaza of Cerén in El Salvador

=== Structure 10 ===
Structure 10 is a multi-roomed structure with many corridors. Archaeologists interpret Structure 10 as being used for community festivals in the Classic Maya period, based on features associated with ceremonial activities. Inside Structure 10 was a north corridor for food preparation, while the east corridor stored several vessels. For instance, decorated vessels and a red painted deer and twine headdress was recovered in Structure 10, which has been interpreted by archaeologists as connected with fertility and harvest rituals. Vessels filled with achiote seeds, found in associated with ceremonial objects suggest that the eruption may have interrupted a ceremony. Additionally, archaeologists propose that a north corridor was used for food preparation, while the east corridor may have been used for storage.

=== Structure 12 ===
Structure 12 is located 5 meters away from Structure 10 and was defined by a doorway and two lattice windows that directed and restricted traffic inside the structure. Similarly to Structure 10, archaeologists believe Structure 12 was also associated with the performance of religious activities. The storage of miscellaneous female-associated artifacts discovered in the niche of an earthen bench may have been a part of a woman's supernatural tool kit. The tool kit of ceramic figurines, shell fragments, beans, and antlers has led scholars to infer the building was for the diviner to hold divinatory activities in the back rooms and through a window of the west room.

=== Structure 1 ===
Structure 1 is also known as Household 1 in archaeological literature, and has been fully excavated. Archaeologists propose a service relationship between 1 and Structure 10 and Structure 12 because the kitchen of 1 presumably was used for masa production with their supply of metates for ceremonies inside Structures 10 and 12. The difference in hearths based on amount of wear was an indicator to scholars to identify if the building was for ritualistic activities or not. The combination of phosphorus detection and heavy metal extraction within the site have allowed archaeologists to discover that each household stored about 70 vessels for cooking, plus serving food and drinks conducted in kitchen and midden areas in comparison to other areas.

== Economy ==
The community of Cerén locally produced agave fibers, manos, and metates, and pottery vessels, while acquiring imports such as cutting tools made from obsidian and chert, jade from the north (Sierra de las Minas), or fancy pottery from Copán presumably from elite-managed markets outside. Once households owned these commodities, they often participated in horizontal exchanges with other households in the village or places nearby in the case of a surplus. The orientation of the households in the village and the assemblages found in each one helped scholars determine that the building was used for non-ceremonial purposes, rather than ceremonial purposes.

== Discovery ==
The site was discovered in 1976 by a bulldozer driver leveling ground for a government agricultural project. The first structures dug up were Structure 10 and 12 that were part of the northeastern area of the village. It was explored in depth by Payson Sheets, a professor of anthropology at the University of Colorado at Boulder, in 1978 and 1980. Excavation resumed in 1988, and has been continuous since then. Approximately 70 buildings have been uncovered so far, including storehouses, kitchens, living quarters, workshops, a religious structure, and a communal sauna.

== Gallery ==
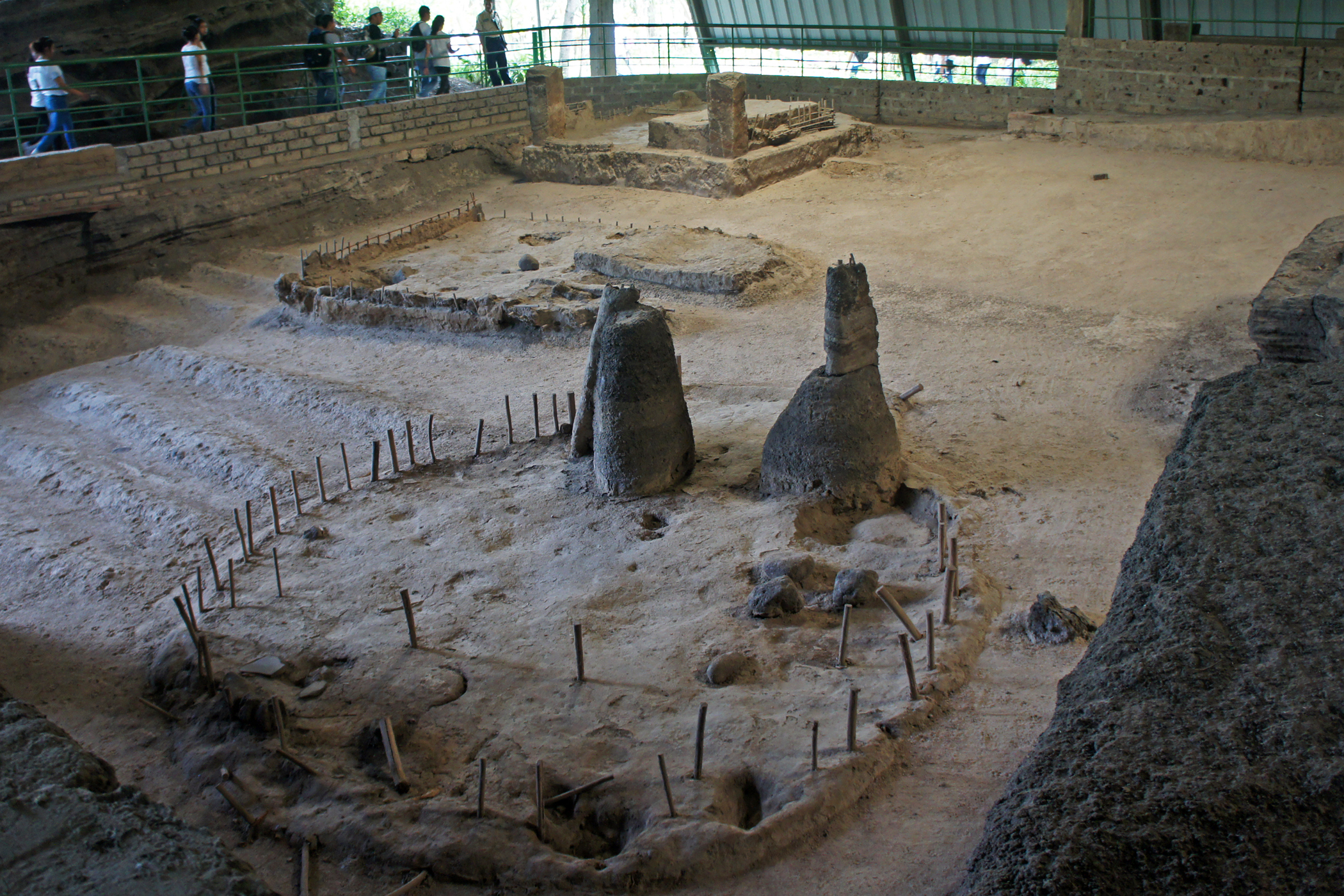

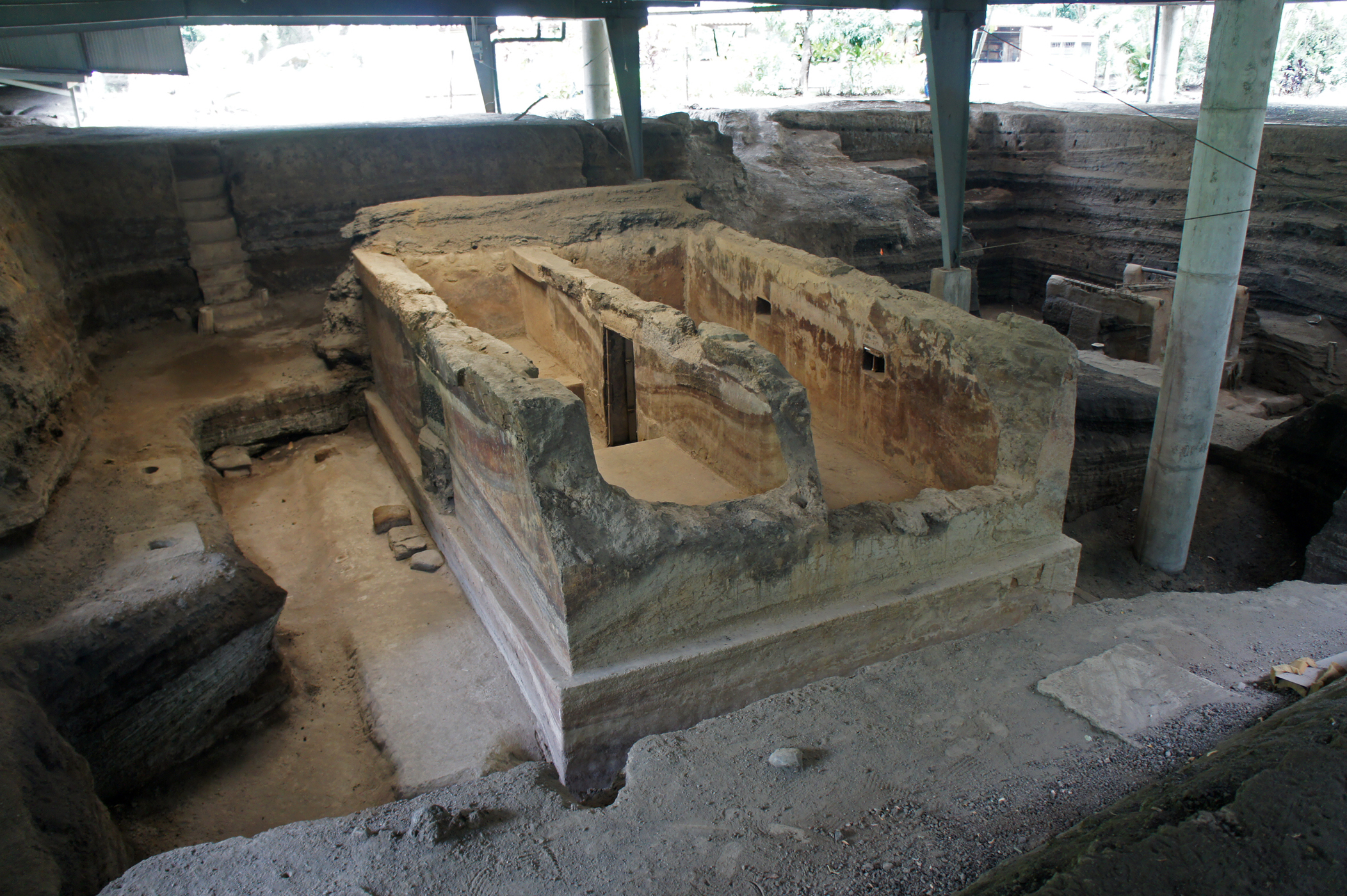

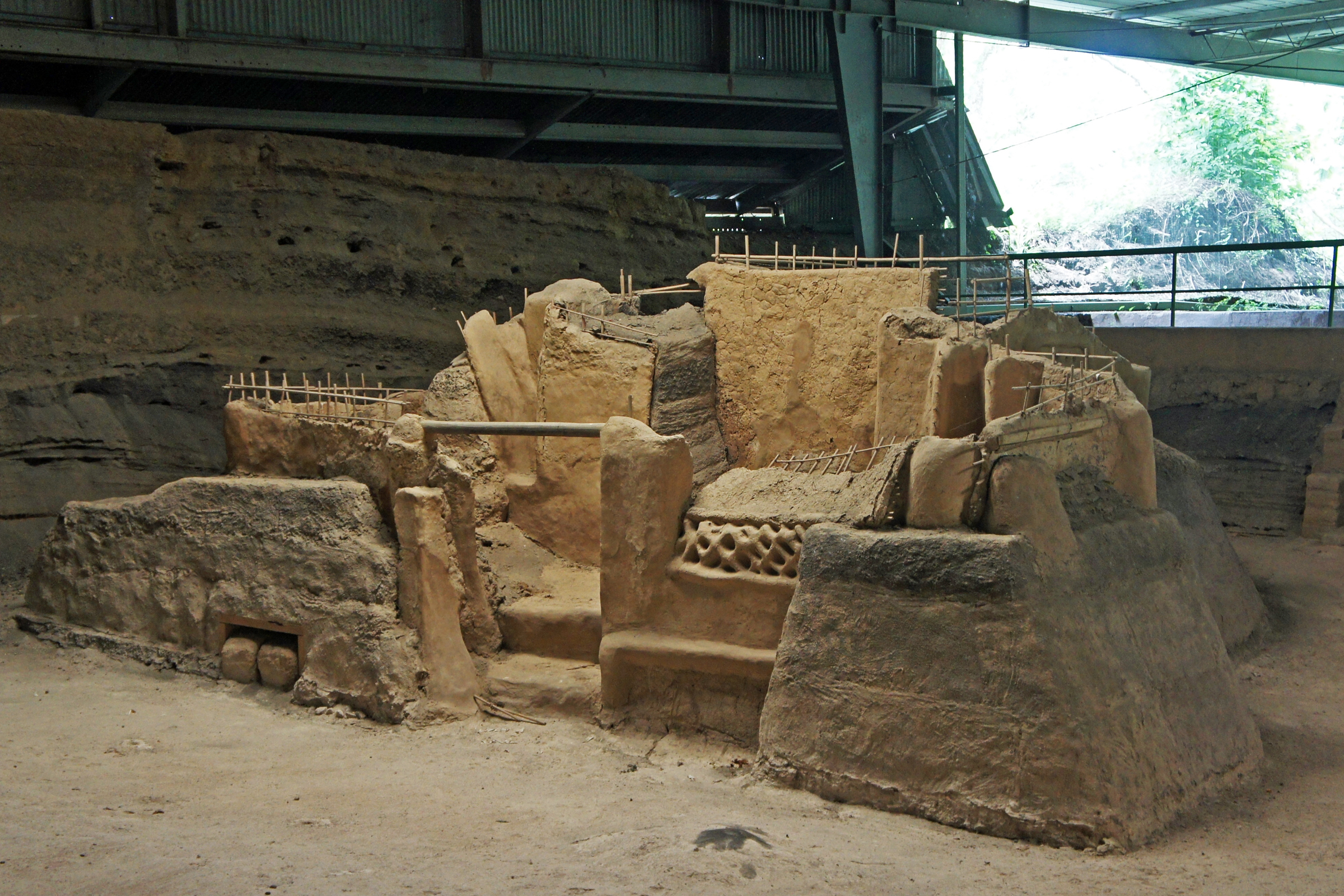

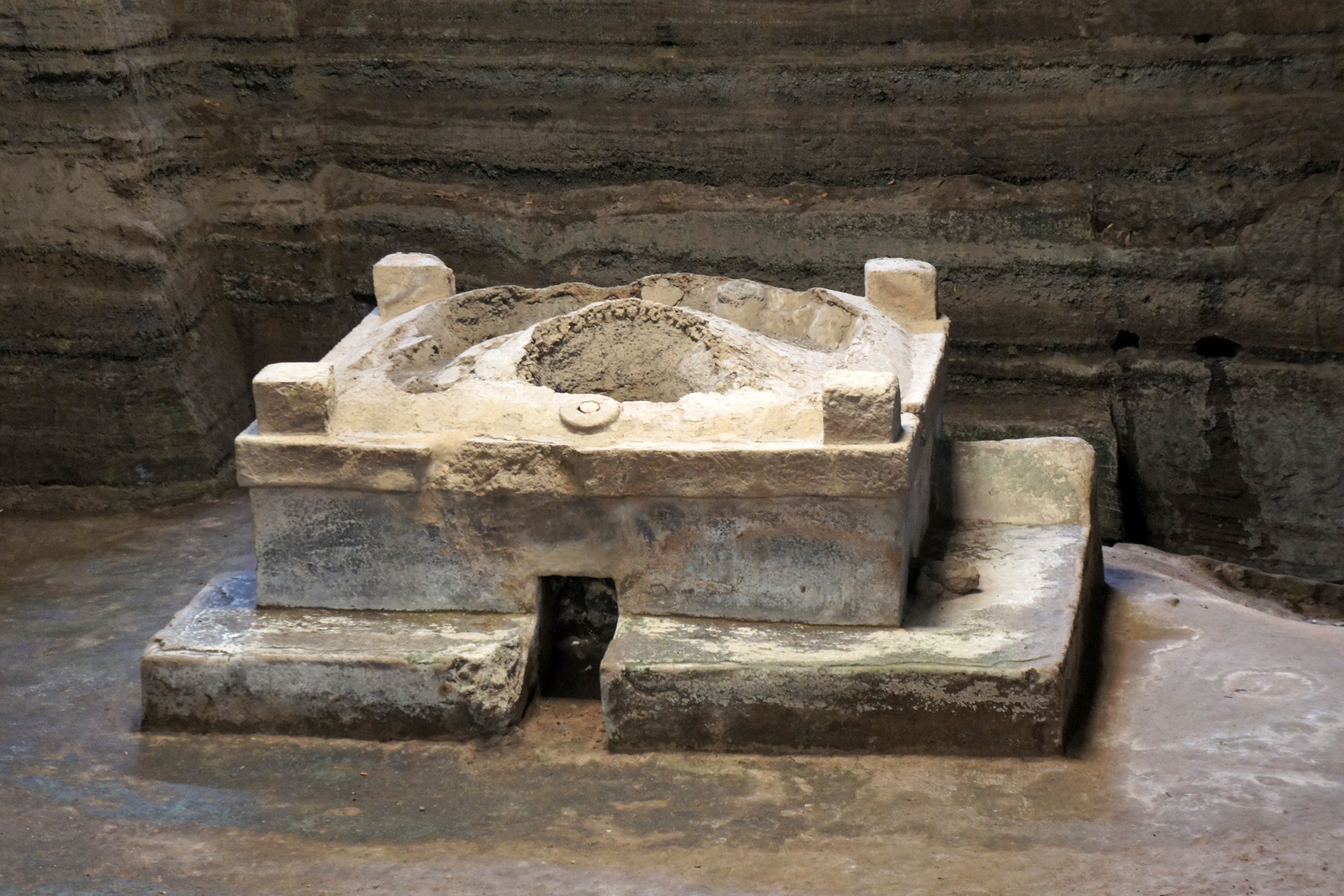

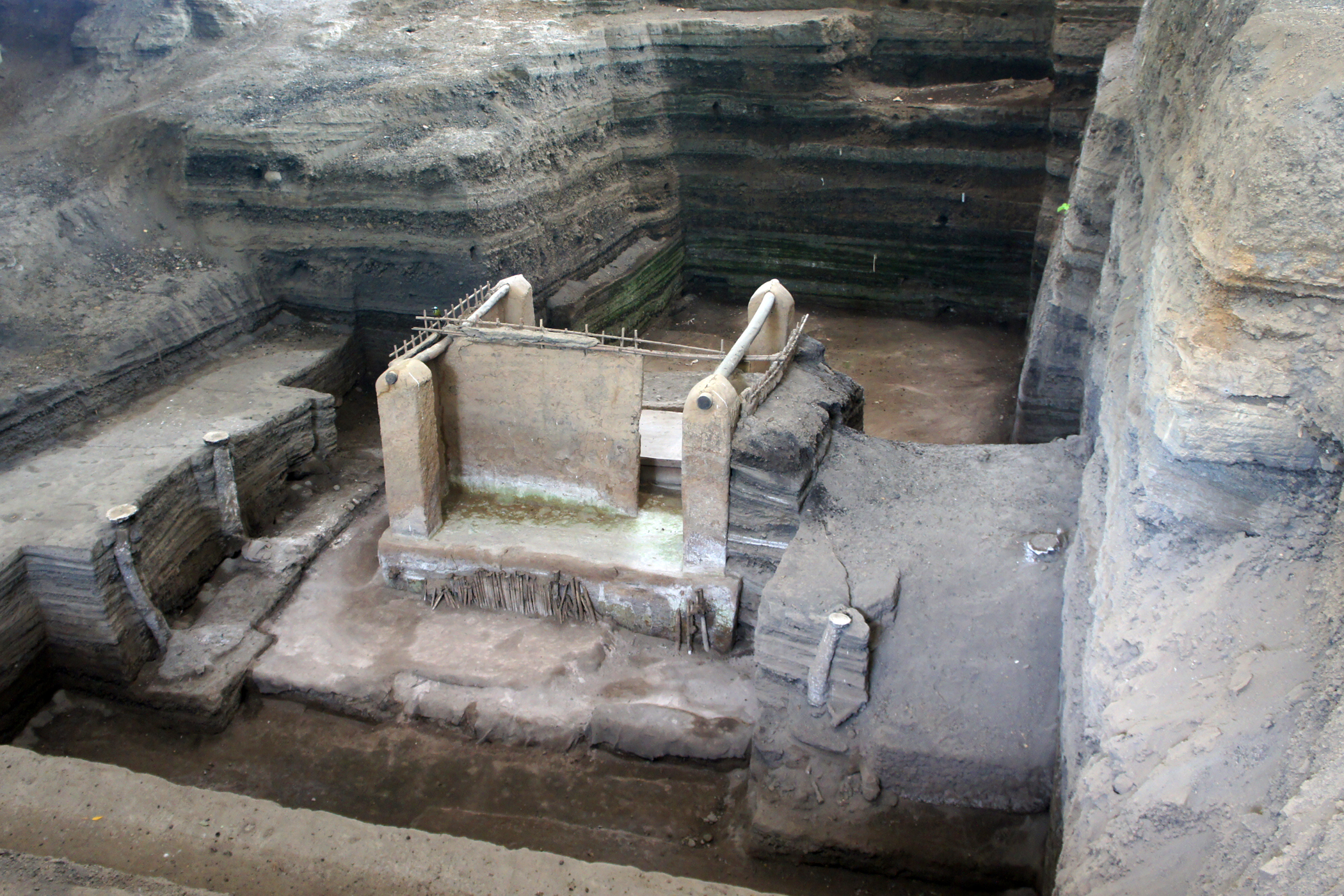

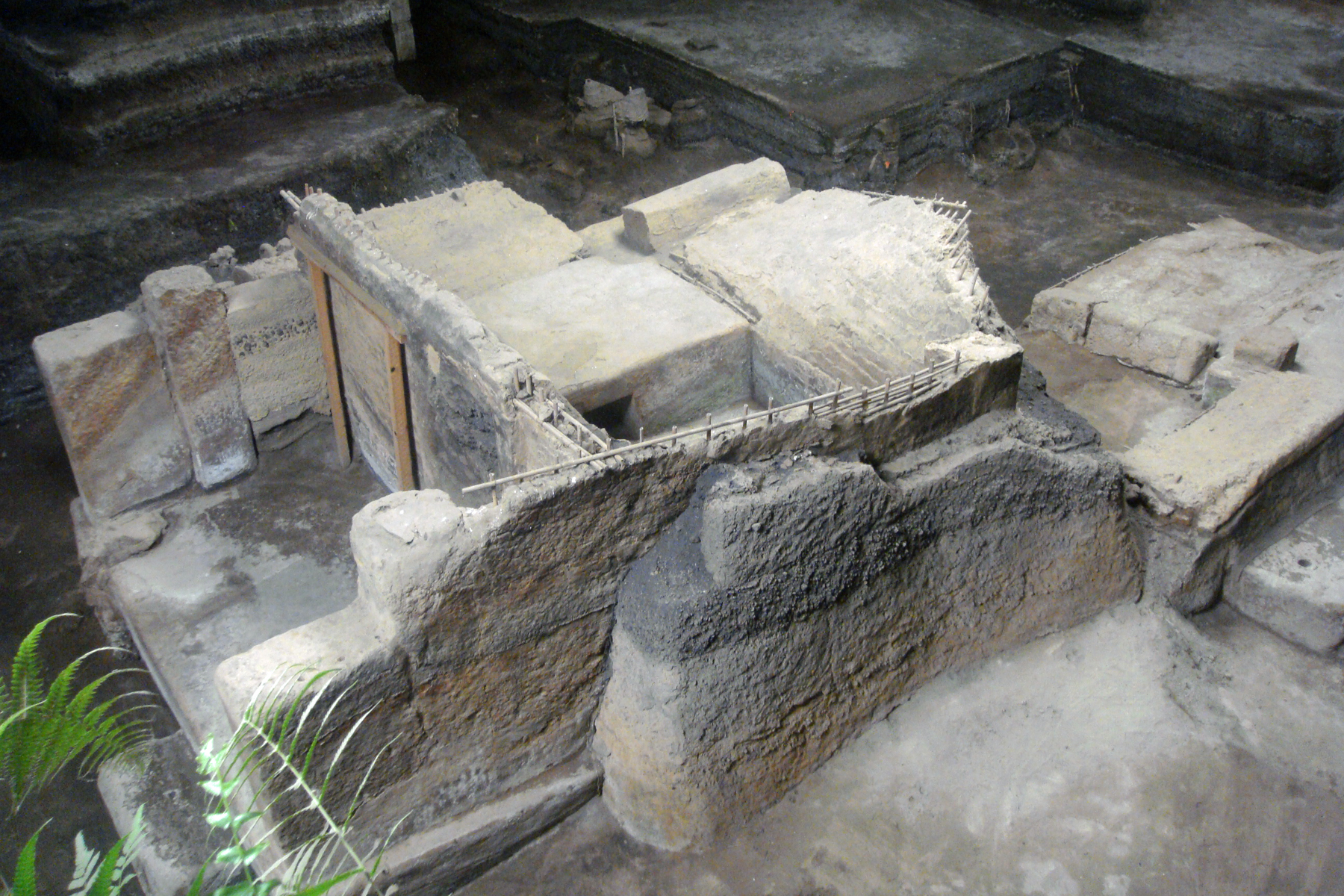

== Bibliography ==
- Before the Volcano Erupted: The Ancient Cerén Village in Central America. Texas University Press, 2002. ISBN 0-292-77761-2
