= List of earthquakes in Samoa =

The primary tectonic feature near Samoa is the northernmost extent of the Tonga Trench where the Pacific plate is being subducted beneath the Australian plate. The trench strikes south-southeast between New Zealand and Samoa, then turns sharply to the west. Its close proximity makes the Samoan Islands prone to tsunami that are generated during subduction events.

== Earthquakes ==
Date	Region	Coords	Mag.	MMI	Deaths	Injuries	Comments
2009-09-29		15.52°S 172.03°W	8.1 M_{w}		189	Hundreds	Moderate tsunami
1977-04-02		16.7°S 172.1°W	7.6 M_{s}	VI			Limited damage / tsunami
1917-06-25		15.08°S 173°W	8.5 M_{w}				Large tsunami
Note: The inclusion criteria for adding events are based on WikiProject Earthquakes' notability guideline that was developed for stand alone articles. The principles described also apply to lists. In summary, only damaging, injurious, or deadly events should be recorded.

== See also ==
- List of earthquakes in Tonga
- List of earthquakes in Fiji
