= 1916–1917 Nantou earthquakes =

Earthquakes in Taiwan

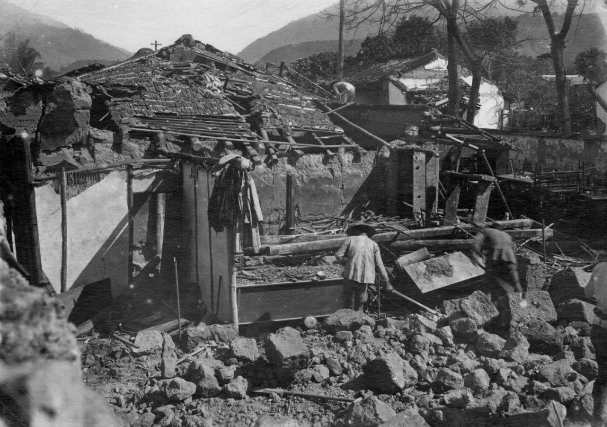

- Location within Taiwan
- UTC time: ??
- Local date: August 28, 1916–January 7, 1917
- Magnitude: 6.8 M_{L} (largest)
- Epicenter: 24.0°N 121.0°E
- Areas affected: Taiwan, Empire of Japan
- Casualties: 71 dead

The 1916–1917 Nantou earthquakes (Chinese: 1916年南投地震系列; pinyin: 1916 nián Nántóu dìzhèn xìliè) affected central Taiwan in 1916 and 1917, causing heavy damage in sparsely populated Nanto Chō (modern-day Nantou County) and claiming 71 lives. The strongest quake registered at 6.8 M_{L} and besides the loss of life caused widespread damage to agricultural and forestry industries in central Taiwan.

== Earthquakes ==
The series consisted of four main damaging quakes and dozens of smaller quakes which were not so damaging. The first major quake, on 28 August 1916, was the strongest at magnitude 6.8, but the hypocentre was relatively deep in the Earth's crust. The most deadly quake in the series came on January 5 of the following year, registering at 6.2 on the Richter scale with a shallow hypocentre, killing 54 people.

Seismometers were installed in the area in 1898 shortly after the Japanese took control of Taiwan, but there was relatively little seismic activity in Nantou between then and 1916.

Date (UTC+8)	Time (UTC+8)	Latitude (°N)	Longitude (°E)	Depth (km)	Magnitude (M_{L}）	Dead	Houses destroyed
28 August 1916	15:27	24.0	121.0	45	6.8	16	614
15 November 1916	06:31	24.1	120.9	3	6.2	1	97
5 January 1917	00:55	24.0	121.0	shallow	6.2	54	130
7 January 1917	02:08	23.9	120.9	shallow	5.5		187

== Damage ==
According to Taiwan's Central Weather Bureau, there were 70 or 71 killed by the quakes, while 98 people were seriously injured and 208 lightly injured. There were 1,212 dwellings completely destroyed, while a further 1,821 dwellings were partially destroyed. The assessed cost of damage for just the August 28 quake was ¥130,393. At the time the camphor industry was a major contributor to the Taiwanese economy, and the forested mountains of Nantou were where the majority of camphor trees were felled and processed. The earthquake destroyed 98 camphor extraction facilities, seriously affecting the local economy.

The January 1917 quake was reportedly felt in much of China, and was quite severe in Hangzhou.

== See also ==
- List of earthquakes in 1916
- List of earthquakes in 1917
- List of earthquakes in Taiwan
