= 1917 Bali earthquake =

Earthquake in Indonesia in 1917

- Location within Bali
- UTC time: 1917-01-20 23:11:34
- ISC event
- USGS-ANSS: ComCat
- Local date: January 21, 1917
- Local time: 07:11
- Magnitude: 6.6 M_{s}
- Epicenter: 8.492°S 115.198°E
- Areas affected: Dutch East Indies, Bali
- Max. intensity: MMI IX (Violent)
- Tsunami: Minor
- Landslides: Many
- Foreshocks: Yes
- Casualties: 1,500

The 1917 Bali earthquake occurred at 07:11 local time on 21 January (23:11 on 20 January UTC). It had an estimated magnitude of 6.6 on the surface-wave magnitude scale and had a maximum perceived intensity of IX (Violent) on the Mercalli intensity scale. It caused widespread damage across Bali, particularly in the south of the island. It triggered many landslides, which caused 80% of the 1,500 casualties.

== Tectonic setting ==
The island of Bali forms part of the Sunda Arc, which formed above the convergent boundary where the Australian plate is subducting beneath the Sunda plate. The rate of convergence across the line of the Sunda–Java Trench is 7.5 cm per year. Eastwards from Bali, the Sunda Arc is also being thrust over the Bali and Flores back-arc basins on a series of south-dipping thrusts. Focal mechanisms for earthquakes near Bali are dominantly thrust sense on both the subduction interface and the system of thrust faults to the north.

== Earthquake ==
The earthquake was recorded by the Wiechert seismograph at Batavia (now Jakarta), which indicated an epicenter southeast of the island. There was a general decrease in the intensity of the shaking from the south of the island to the north. The earthquake was also felt on eastern Java and Sumbawa, and particularly strongly on Lombok. A small tsunami was observed on the southeastern coast of Bali, but caused no damage.

== Damage ==
The earthquake triggered many landslides. There were an estimated 1,500 casualties, of which 80% were a result of the landslides. 2,431 temples were destroyed or severely damaged, including the Pura Ulun Danu Batur.

== Gallery ==
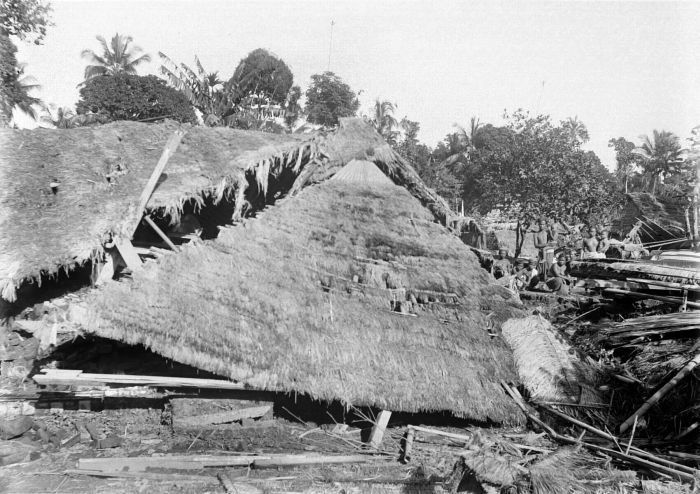
Collapsed houses after the earthquake in Bali

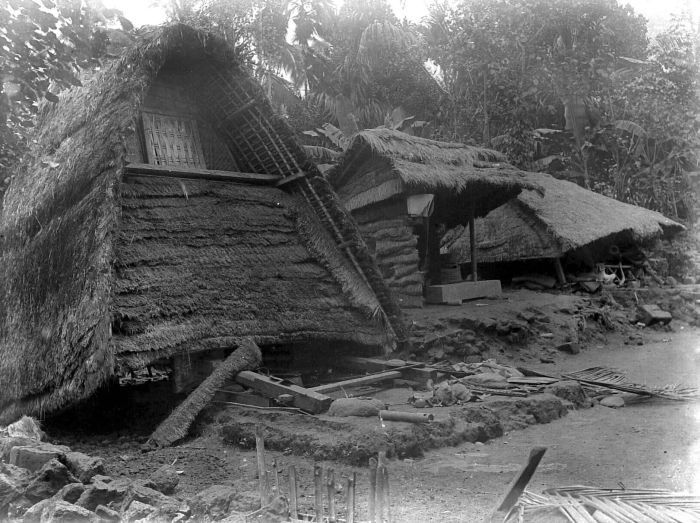
Collapsed houses after the earthquake in Bali

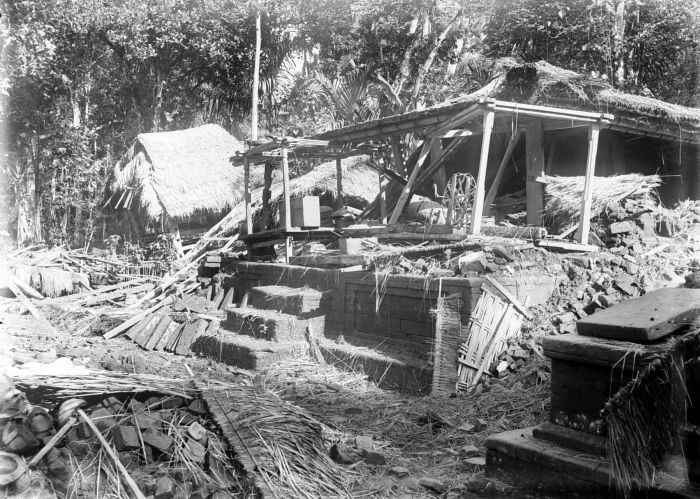
Collapsed houses after the earthquake in Bali

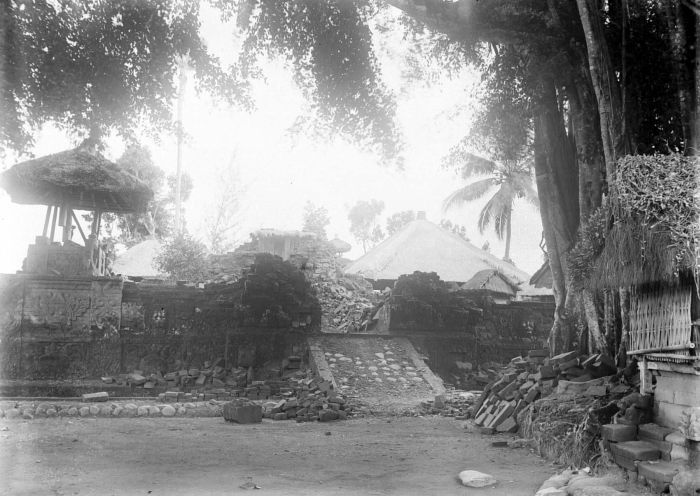
Collapsed houses after the earthquake in Bali

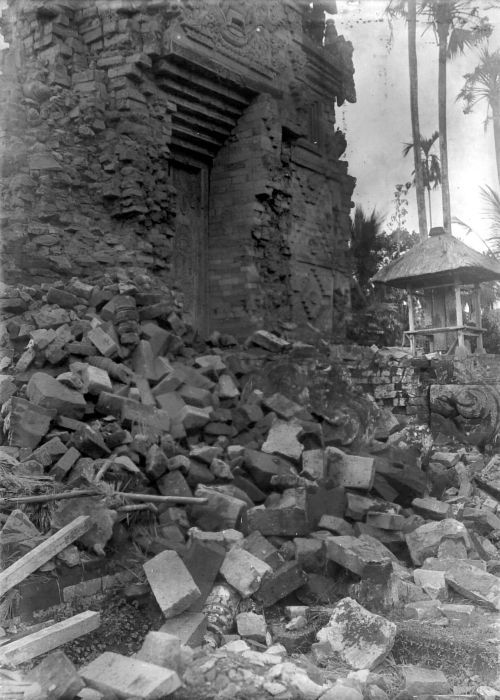
Collapsed building after the earthquake in Bali

== See also ==
- List of earthquakes in 1917
- List of earthquakes in Indonesia
