= List of national parks of El Salvador =

There are five national parks in El Salvador.

== List of national parks ==
- El Boquerón National Park (Crater del Volcán de San Salvador National Park)
- San Diego and San Felipe Las Barras National Park
- El Imposible National Park
- Montecristo National Park
- Los Volcanes National Park (Cerro Verde National Park)

== Other protected areas ==
(partial list)

- San Isidro Natural Monument
- Volcán de San Miguel Protected Area
- Isla Martin Pérez Protected Area
- Isla Tasajera Protected Area
- Isla Conchaguita Protected Area
- Isla Meanguera Protected Area
- Isla Zacatillo Protected Area
- Walter Tilo Deininger Park
- Laguna de Las Ninfas Protected Area
