= 1917 Samoa earthquake =

- Location within Oceania
- UTC time: 1917-06-26 05:49:46
- ISC event: 913548
- USGS-ANSS: ComCat
- Local date: 25 June 1917
- Local time: 18:49
- Magnitude: 8.0 M_{w}
- Depth: 10 km (6.2 mi)
- Epicenter: 14.996°S 173.270°W
- Areas affected: Samoa and American Samoa
- Tsunami: Yes

The 1917 Samoa earthquake occurred on June 26 at 18:49 (local time). The epicenter was located to the southwest of the Samoan Islands, where it was described as the worst earthquake to hit the archipelago in 50 years. Though there were no casualties, residents on the island were frightened by the tsunami and sought refuge in higher ground. The earthquake damaged two churches and several homes. A tsunami also flooded the islands and washed away homes.

== Geology ==
The Samoan Islands are composed of linear chains of volcanic islands near the boundary between the Tonga plate and the Pacific plate. The Pacific plate slightly moves west-northwest at a slow speed, creating submarine volcanoes. The youngest and most active volcano is named Vailuluʻu, with a volcanic cone just about 300 metres (330 yd) off the crater of Vailuluʻu. Other than volcanoes, there are multiple volcanic islands situated west of Vailuluʻu. The islands' geology consists of mafic material, like basalt and gabbro, because of the Samoa hotspot.

== Earthquake ==
The earthquake measured M_{w} 8.0 and struck at a depth of 15 kilometres (9.3 miles). The epicenter was located 120 km (75 mi) north-northeast of Hihifo, Tonga. Alongside the M_{w} 8.1 event in 2009, both earthquakes were among the largest to occur near the Samoan Islands. The earthquake occurred along the plate boundary between the Tonga and Pacific plates. Due to a lack of instrumental recordings, the earthquake's focal mechanism could not be determined.

== Impact ==
The earthquake was felt for two minutes and seven jolts were felt. In Apia (New Zealand-occupied German Samoa), a customs building sustained a few cracks in its concrete and its verandah detached from the structure. Severe damage also occurred to homes and businesses. Rockslides and uprooted trees were observed in the hilly parts of the island. At Pago Pago, American Samoa, an LDS temple was levelled, and another church was wrecked in Leone. The earthquake and tsunami did not cause any casualties.

The tsunami occurred during the low tide and its destructive effects were limited by the presence of coral reefs. It caused significant damage on coasts of the Aleipata Islands, Savaiʻi, Lotofaga and Pago Pago. Many native residents ran to the hills when the tsunami washed along the coast and crashed into homes. At Pago Pago Bay, the sea level fluctuated some 5–6 ft (1.5–1.8 m) higher or lower than the normal tide level. This observation by the native population sparked fear and they settled in higher grounds. A 3 ft (0.91 m) tsunami caused little damage along the southern parts of Bavail, Upola, and Tutuila. The water level at a lagoon on Keppel Island also rose. Half of the village of Lotofaga was flooded and destroyed.

The tsunami was described on Aleipata as a "white wall of foam fully 10 ft (3.0 m)" which washed over the beach and homes, carrying debris. The waves also washed coconut tree logs and dumped them several yards from their former position near the beach. On Lotofaga, the inundation extended through homes and into the island's plantations. Half a village was flooded, and a cement wall estimated to be a foot thick and three feet high was pushed some 30 ft (9.1 m) by the waves. A bridge at Palauli on Savaiʻi was carried away and several homes were demolished. All of the native homes at Satupaitea were smashed by the tsunami. On Tutuila, many homes were also lost. After the tsunami, many of the natives sought refuge in the mountains for the rest of the night. Dispatchers were deployed in Suva, Fiji to help relief efforts. A newspaper described the damage as only the "loan of several cutters and the dooding of several shops and dwellings."

== See also ==
- List of earthquakes in 1917
- List of earthquakes in Samoa
