= El Boquerón National Park =

National park in El Salvador

- Crater del Volcán de San Salvador National Park
- IUCN category II (national park)
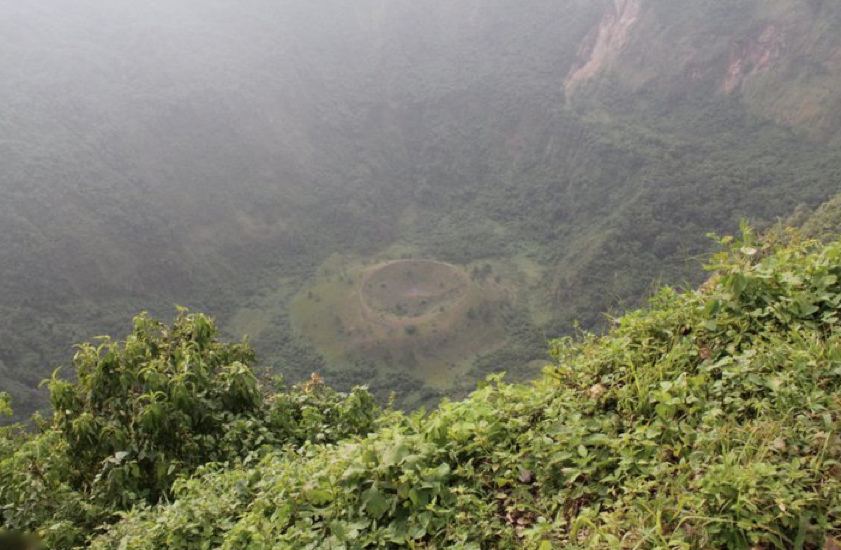
- Boquerón crater with Boqueroncito cinder cone visible at the bottom

- Location within El Salvador
- Nearest city: San Salvador
- Coordinates: 13°44′N 89°17′W
- Area: 2.05 km^{2} (0.79 sq mi)
- Designation: National park
- Designated: 2008
- Administrator: Ministry of the Environment and Natural Resources

El Boquerón National Park (Spanish: Parque Nacional El Boquerón, is located on top of the San Salvador Volcano at 5,905 feet (1,800 meters) the park's main attraction is a crater five kilometers in diameter and 558 meters deep. In addition, there is a small crater within the crater named "Boqueroncito" (little Boquerón). El Boquerón has a cool temperate climate year round.

The park is home to many plant species identified as ornamentals such as "cartuchos", hydrangeas, begonias and wild "sultanas". There is wildlife such as armadillos, raccoons, deer, foxes, among others.

The park features a visitors' centre and short hiking trails up the side and along the rim of the crater.
