= 1917 Sichuan earthquake =

Earthquake in Yunnan, China

- Location within Yunnan
- UTC time: 1917-07-30 23:54:08
- ISC event
- USGS-ANSS: ComCat
- Local date: 31 July 1917
- Local time: 07:54:08 CST (UTC+8)
- Magnitude: M_{w} 7.0
- Depth: 15 km (9 mi)
- Epicenter: 28.405°N 104.285°E
- Areas affected: Yunnan, China
- Max. intensity: MMI IX (Violent)
- Casualties: 1,800 fatalities, "many" injuries

The 1917 Sichuan earthquake occurred on 31 July, in Yunnan Province, Republic of China, with a moment magnitude of 7.0, killing at least 1,800 people.

== Tectonic setting ==
Yunnan lies in a tectonically complex zone affected by the broad zone of deformation associated with the ongoing collision between the Indian plate and the Eurasian plate. A rhomb-shaped fault-bounded block, known as the Sichuan-Yunnan Block, is recognised that is bounded by the active left-lateral strike-slip faults of the Xianshuihe fault system and the currently right lateral Red River Fault and Jinshajiang Fault.

== Earthquake ==
The earthquake had an epicenter located 42 km (26 mi) west from the town of Xunchang which is a part of the Yunnan Province. It had a maximum Modified Mercalli intensity of IX (Violent). The earthquake was felt in Ludian, Hechuan, Hanyuan, Rong, Yibin, Dafang, Wutongqiao, Bijie, Weining and Huize.

== Impact ==
More than 1,800 merchants, including merchants, travelers, soldiers and local civilians were killed by the earthquake.
