= San Salvador (volcano) =

Complex volcano in El Salvador

San Salvador Volcano
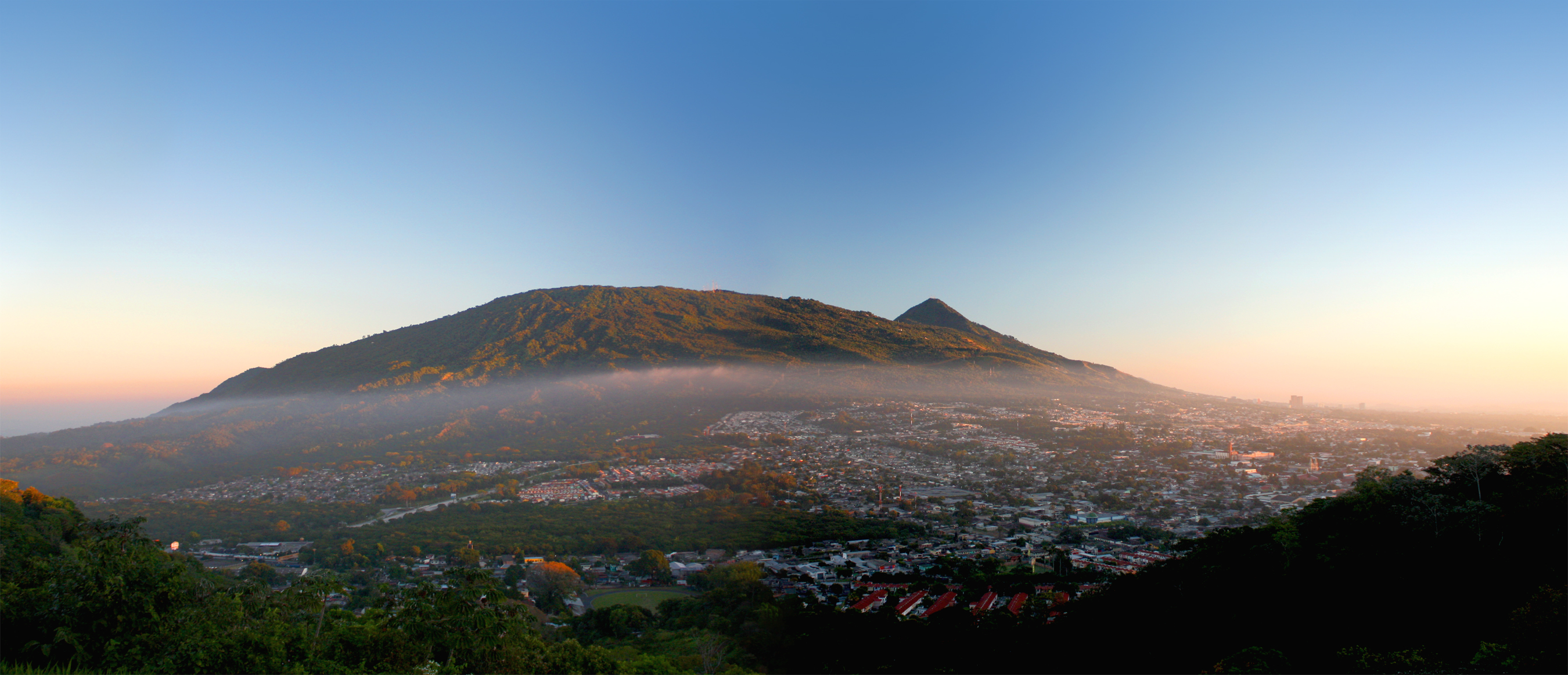
- The San Salvador volcano is instantly recognizable by its distinctive triangular crescent pointed apex, which has a dorsal fin-like shape.

Highest point
- Elevation: 1,893 m (6,211 ft)
- Prominence: 1,580 m (5,180 ft)
- Parent peak: Cerro El Picacho
- Isolation: 4.08 km (2.54 mi)
- Coordinates: 13°44′02″N 89°17′38″W

Naming
- Nickname: Quezaltepeque

Geography
- Location within El Salvador
- Country: El Salvador
- Departments: San Salvador; La Libertad

Geology
- Rock age: 70,000 years
- Mountain type: Complex
- Rock type(s): Basalt and Andesite
- Volcanic arc: Central America Volcanic Arc
- Last eruption: 7 June 1917

Climbing
- Normal route: Drive and hike via El Boquerón Highway
- Access: El Boquerón National Park

The San Salvador Volcano (also known as Quezaltepeque or El Boquerón) is a stratovolcano situated northwest to the city of San Salvador. The crater has been nearly filled with a relatively newer edifice, the Boquerón volcano. San Salvador is adjacent to the volcano and the western section of the city actually lies among its slopes. Due to this close proximity, any geological activity of the volcano, whether eruptive or not, has the potential to result in catastrophic destruction and death to the city. Despite this, the volcano is iconic of the city, and several TV and radio antennas are situated on the El Picacho peaks and the crater of Boqueron. El Picacho, the prominent peak is the highest elevation (1,960 metres altitude).

== Geology ==
San Salvador is the result of subduction as the Cocos plate subducts under the Caribbean plate. More than 90% of subsurface lithology is from the Cenozoic and Quaternary periods, pointing to relatively young volcanic activity. Since 600 CE, there have been six volcanic eruptions: 640 CE ± 30 years, 1200 CE, 1575 CE, 1658–1659 CE, an unconfirmed eruption in 1806 CE, and 1917 CE.

Eruptions have been episodic for the past 70,000 years. Most eruptions are violent to effusive, erupting pumice, pyroclastic material, and basalt. Most past eruptions have not been voluminous. One exception was an eruption 40–30 thousand years ago that deposited a tephra layer 1 meter thick within 10 kilometers of the volcano.

=== 1917 eruption ===
The most recent eruption occurred on 7 June 1917. Rated as a VEI-3 on the volcanic explosivity index, it was classified as a Strombolian-type eruption that erupted ash on the SW slope of the volcano as well as a basaltic lava flow.

At 6:55pm local time, a strong 6.5 magnitude earthquake struck San Salvador. About 35 minutes later at 7:30pm local time, another large 6.4 earthquake struck the city. These earthquakes were devastating to San Salvador with heavy damage to most buildings and fires that raged out of control. Shortly after the second earthquake, the eruption began. Several fissures opened on the northwest flank of the volcano. The crater lake at the summit was completely evaporated within a month. The eruption created the small scoria cone (Boqueroncito) which is about 30–40 m tall. Activity continued intermittently until it ended in November 1917.

== Boquerón edifice ==
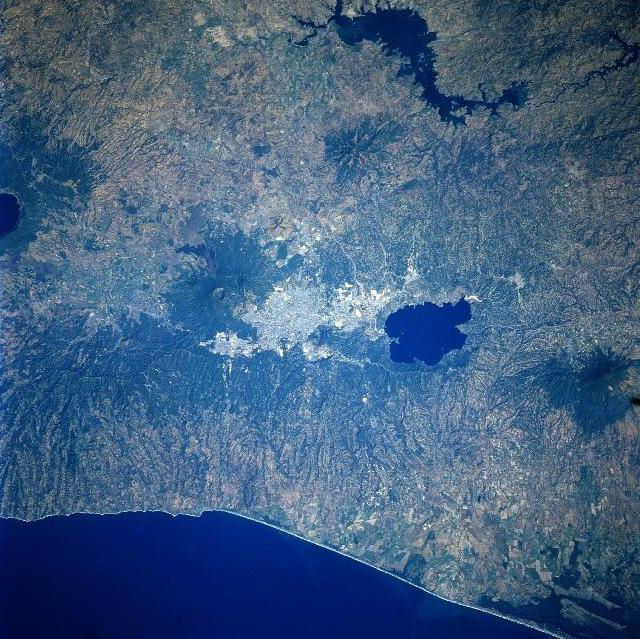
The San Salvador Metropolitan Area is pinned between San Salvador (volcano) and Lake Ilopango Caldera. The Pacific Coast is adjacent south of the city

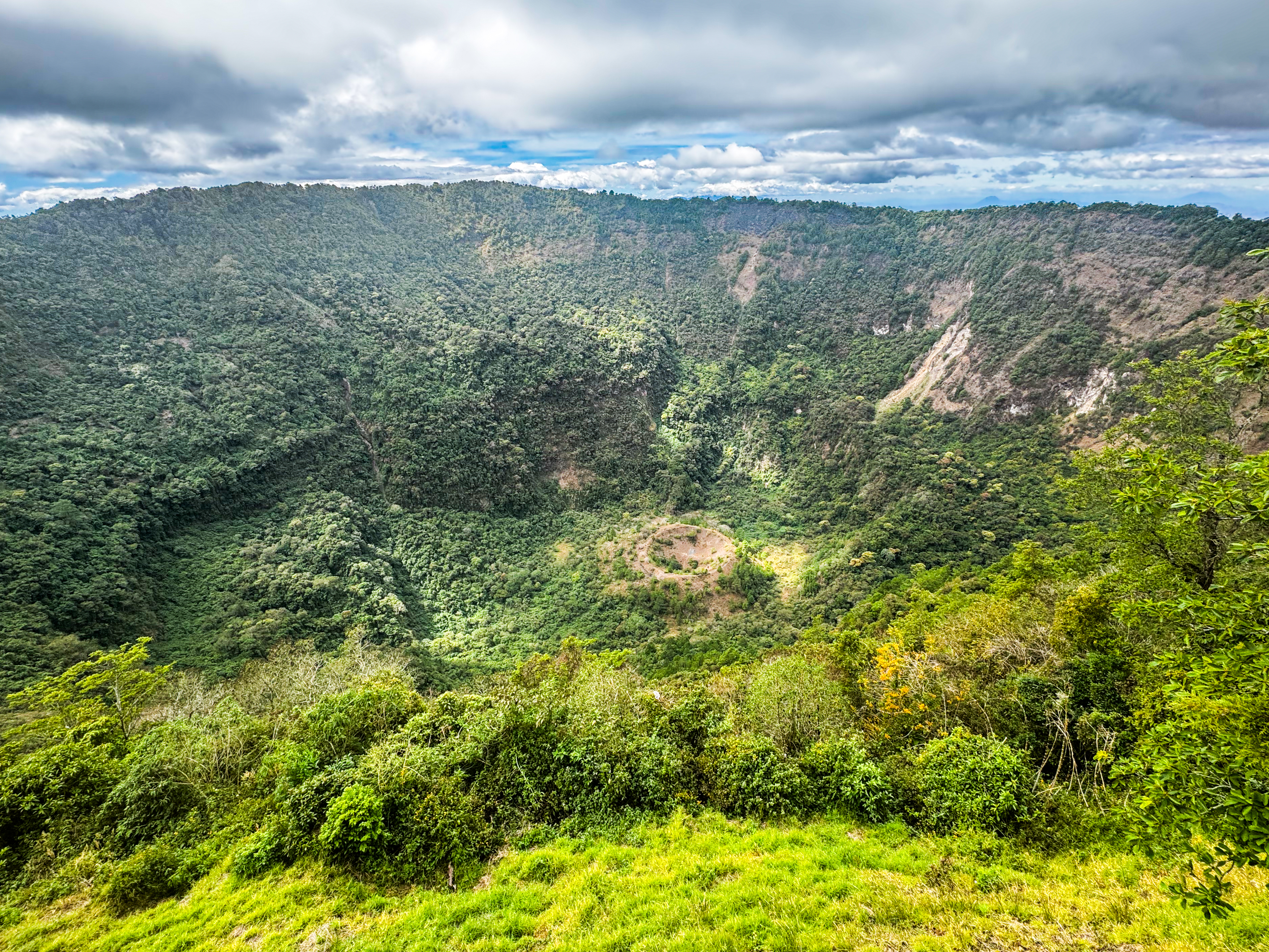
Boquerón crater with Boqueroncito cinder cone visible at the bottom

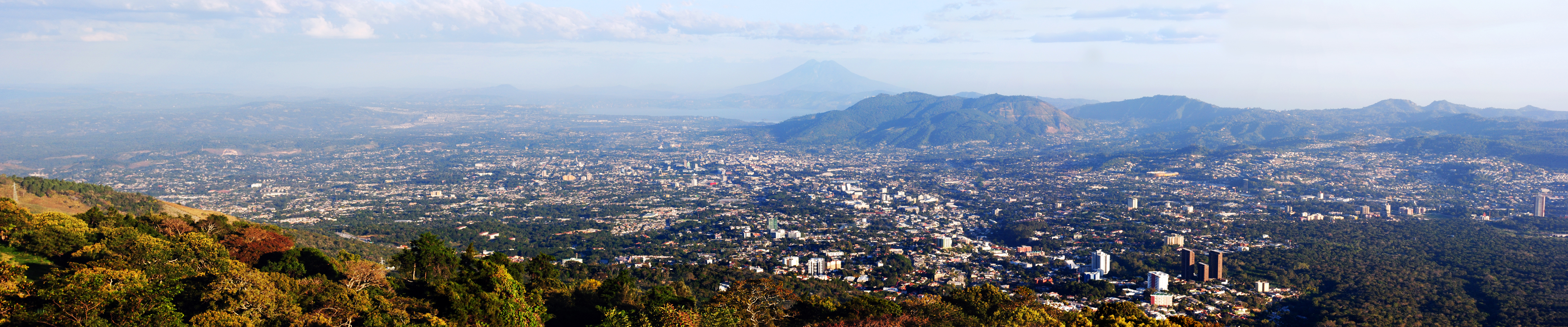
View of San Salvador City from San Salvador volcano's highest point

The main edifice, known as the Boquerón edifice, formed between 700 and 1,000 years ago, filling up a former caldera. The crescent-shaped ridge on the northeast side of the volcano is a remnant of the caldera rim. The lavas of the Boquerón edifice contain more alkali elements and iron oxide than the lavas of the older edifice. Around 800 years ago, the present day crater was formed in a violent explosion. The crater, which gives it the present name (Boquerón means "big mouth" in Spanish) is 1.5 km in diameter and 500m deep. Within the crater around the upper walls, crops are cultivated by the locals who live on the volcano.

The magma chamber which the volcano sits upon contains a number of fissures which protrude along the flanks and sides of the volcano. The northwest (N40W) fissure has been the most active recently, with such significant eruptive events, such as the Loma Caldera eruption which buried the ancient village of Ceren and the eruption of El Playon (1658–71) which buried the town of Nexapa. The citizens relocated to Nejapa and nowadays the eruption is celebrated annually.

The most recent eruption in 1917 caused a flank eruption on the volcano along the N40W fissure. During this eruption, the crater lake inside the Boquerón evaporated and a cinder cone appeared, christened 'Boqueroncito'.

== Gallery ==
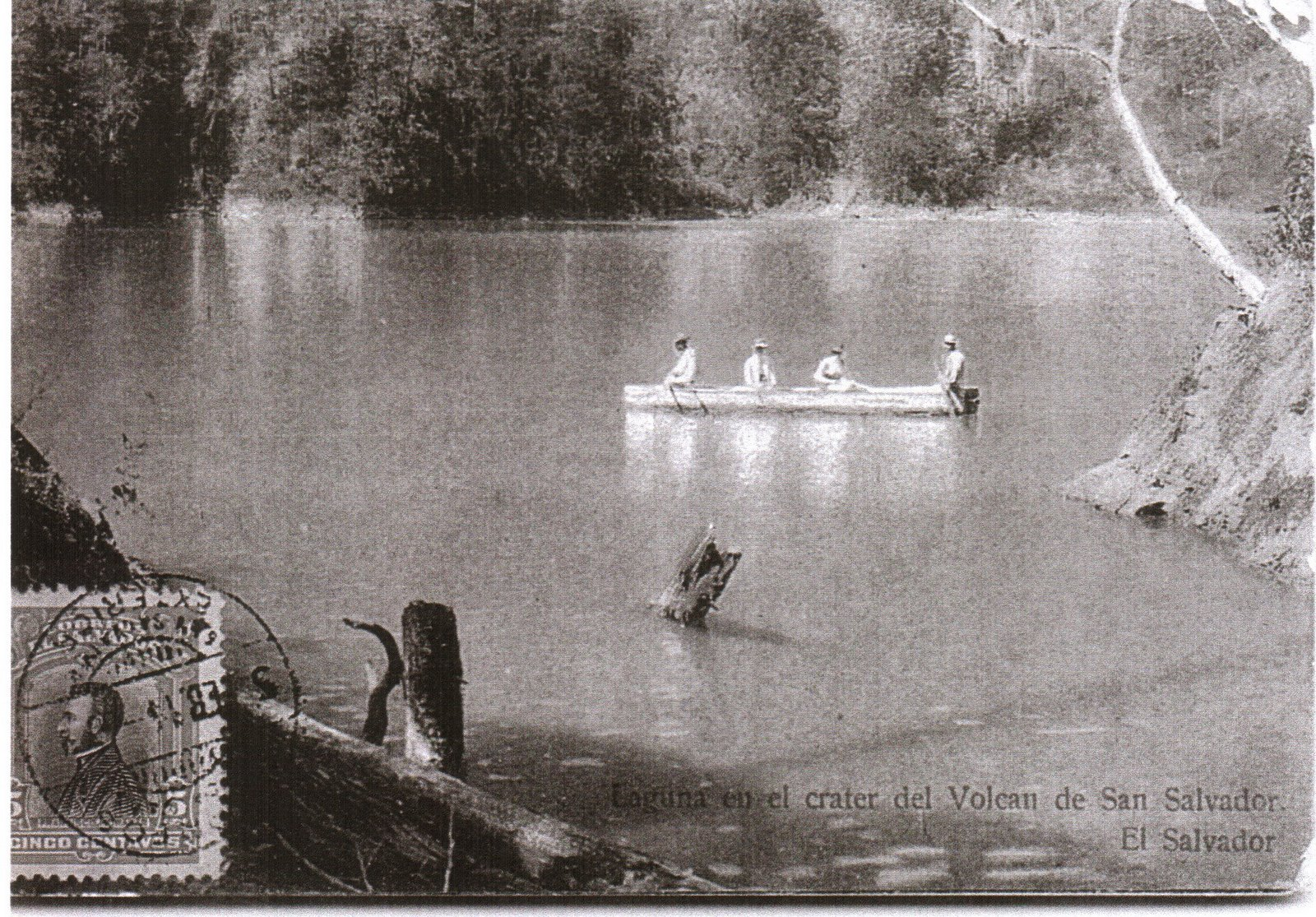
A 1914 postcard showing the lagoon in the crater of San Salvador Volcano, El Salvador. The lagoon disappeared when the volcano erupted in 1917

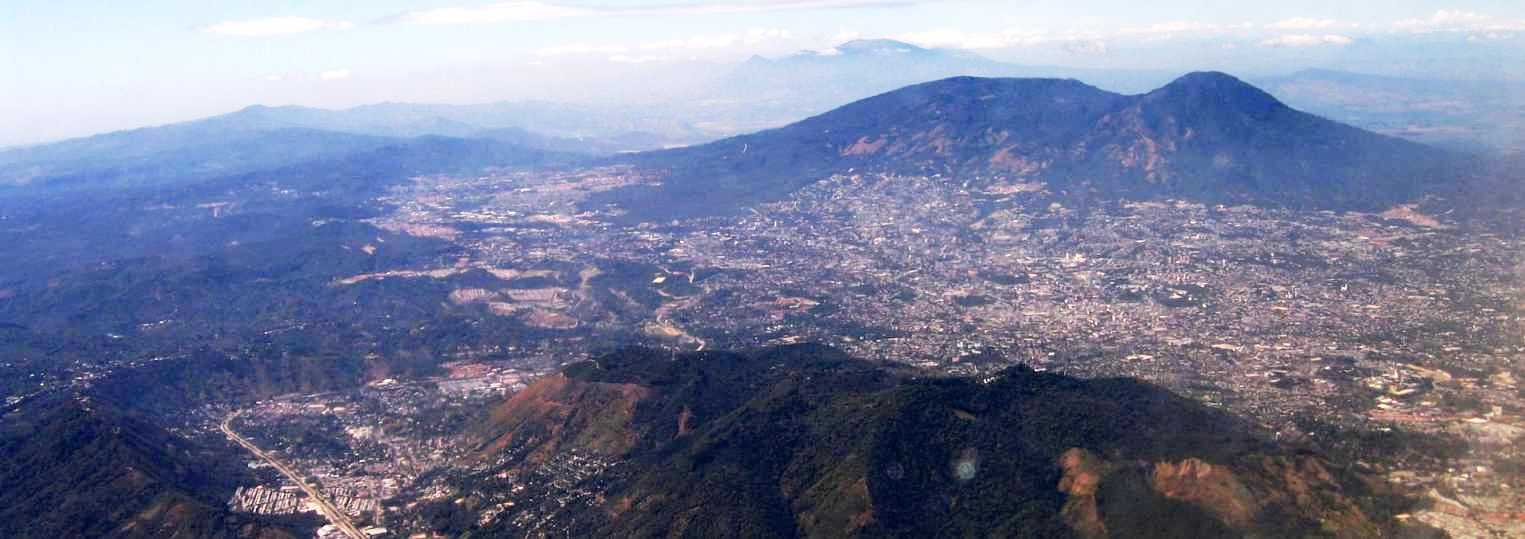
The massive San Salvador volcano dominates the landscape and skyline west of the city of San Salvador.

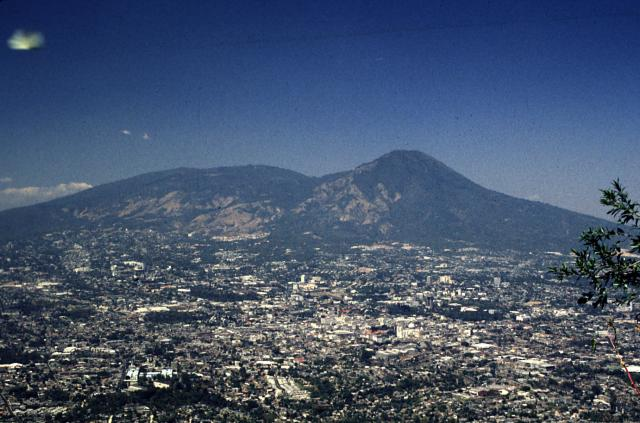
The massive compound volcano dominates the landscape west of El Salvador's capital city of San Salvador.

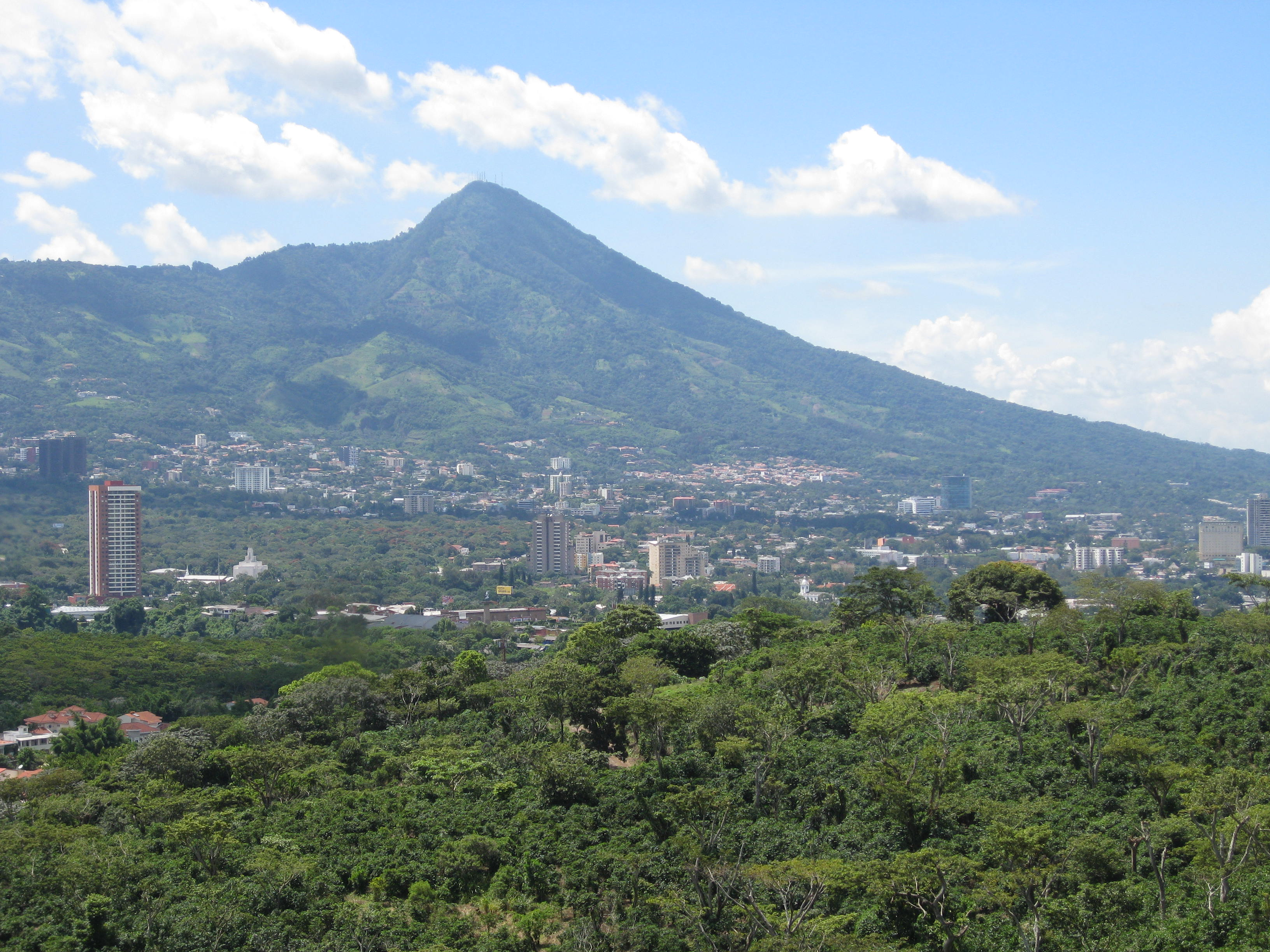
San Salvador skyline with the volcano behind it

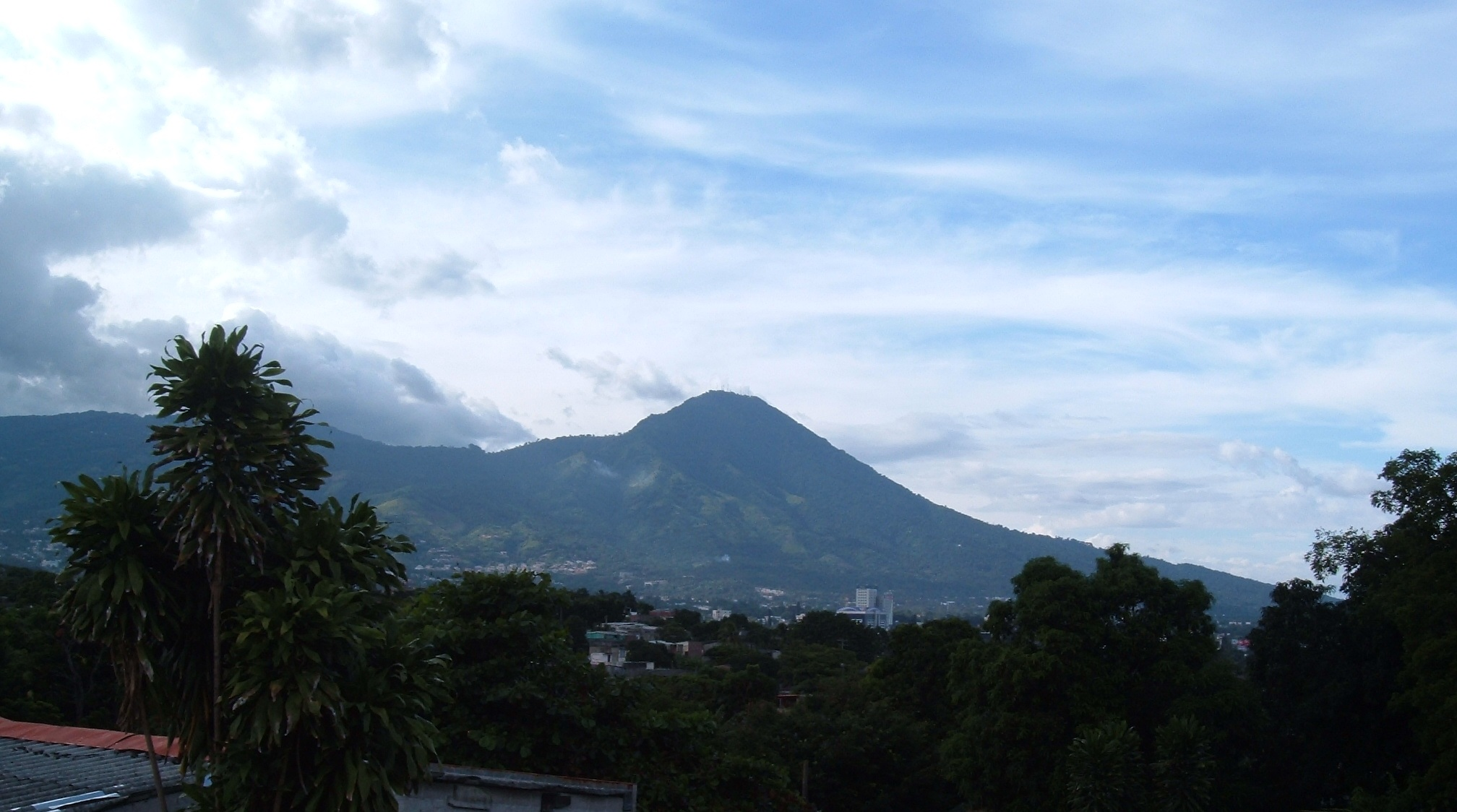
A view of San Salvador volcano.

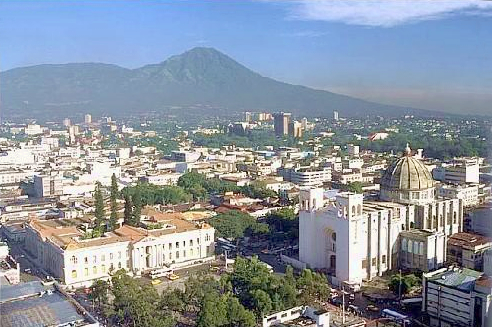
View of San Salvador Volcano from downtown San Salvador

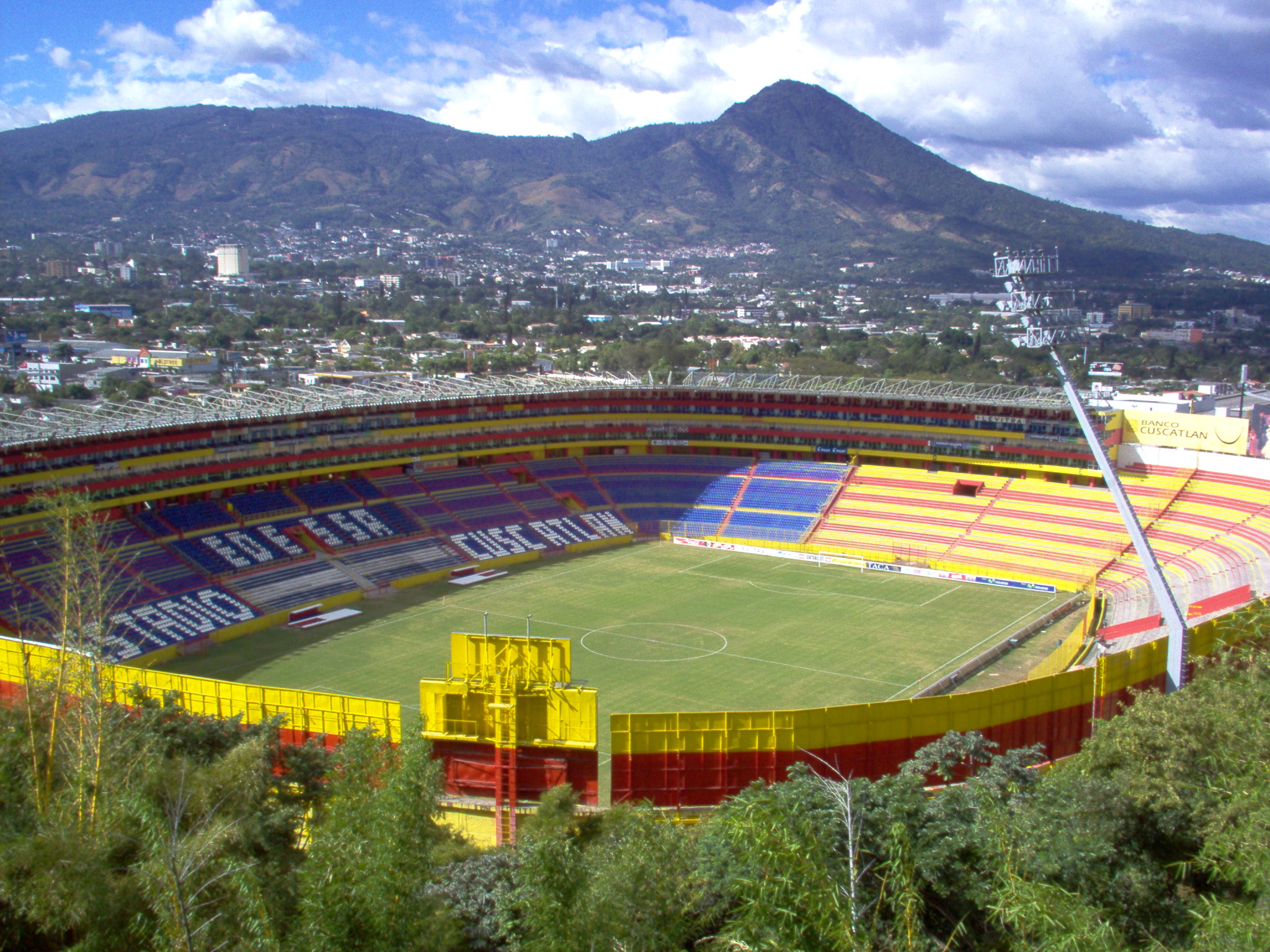
San Salvador Volcano from Cuscatlán Stadium

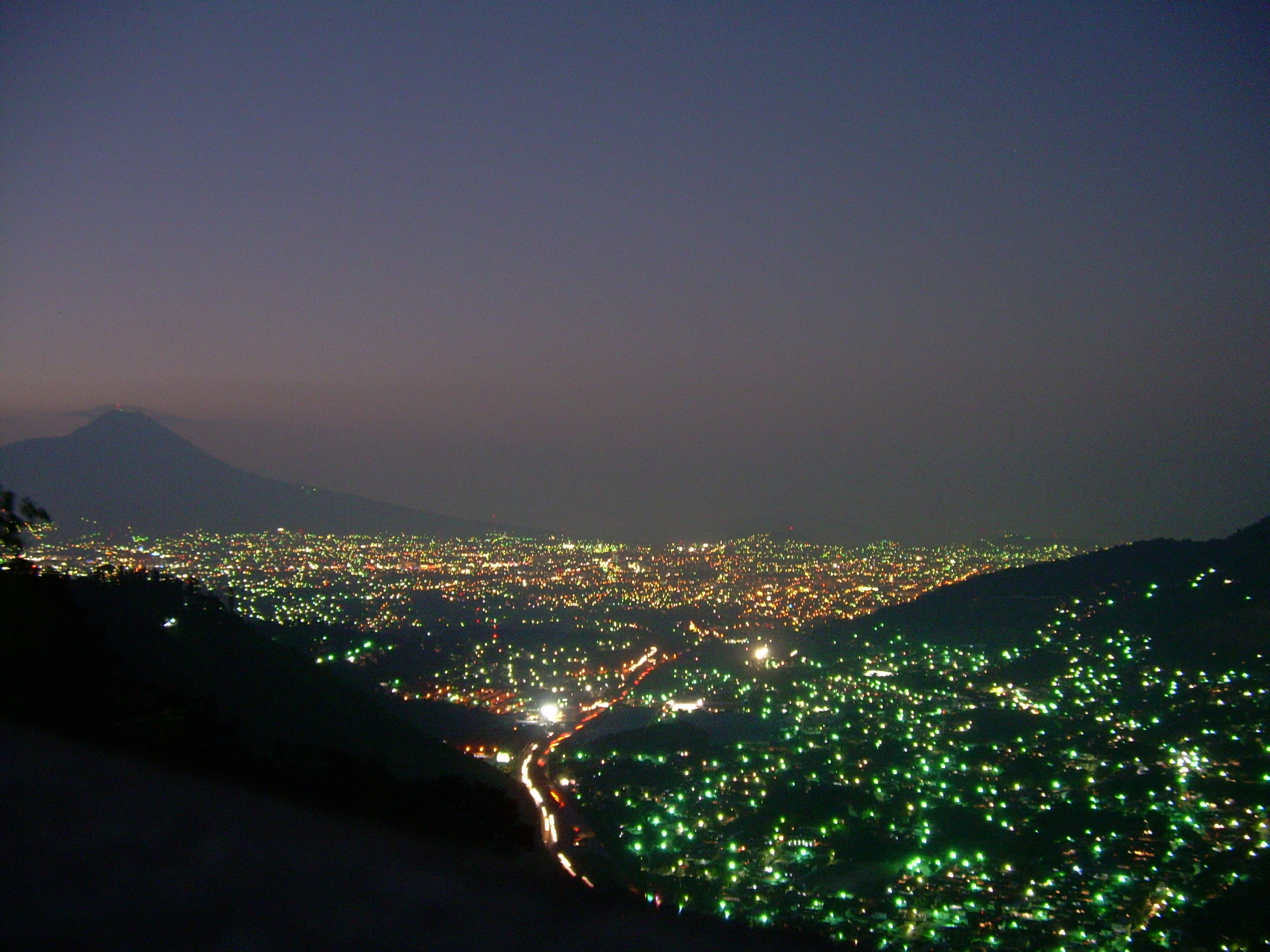
San Salvador volcano towering over San Salvador city at night

== See also ==
- List of volcanoes in El Salvador
