= List of earthquakes in El Salvador =

Notable earthquakes in the history of El Salvador include the following:

== Earthquakes ==
Date	Location	Mag.	MMI	Deaths	Injuries	Notes
2023-01-15	Ahuachapán	5.2 M_{w}	VII		4	Severe damage
2019-05-30	La Libertad	6.6 M_{w}	VI	1	1	
2018-05-06	La Unión	5.4 M_{w}	VI		1	Moderate damage
2017-04-01	La Libertad	5.1 M_{w}	VI	1		
2016-11-24	San Vicente	6.9 M_{w}	IV	1		Death caused by heart attack
2015-08-09	Usulután	4.5 M_{w}	V		4	Moderate damage
2014-10-14	La Unión	7.3 M_{w}	VII	4	Several	Severe damage
2012-08-27	Usulután	7.3 M_{w}	V	0	40+	Major tsunami, over 6 meters
2001-05-08	San Vicente	5.7 M_{w}	VI	1		Moderate damage
2001-02-13	La Paz	6.6 M_{w}	VIII	315		Severe damage
2001-01-13	Usulután	7.7 M_{w}	IX	944	5,565	Severe damage, Major landslide
1987-01-15	La Libertad	4.0 M_{w}	IV			Severe damage
1986-10-10	San Salvador	4.6 M_{w}	V			Additional damage
1986-10-10	San Salvador	5.7 M_{w}	IX	1,000–3,000	10,000–20,000	Extreme damage
1982-06-19	Usulután	7.3 M_{w}	VII	43		$5 million damage
1965-05-03	San Salvador	5.9 M_{w}	VIII	125	500	
1951-05-06	Usulután, La Paz	6.2 M_{s}		400–1,100		
1936-12-19	San Vicente	6.1	VII	200		
1919-04-28	San Salvador	5.9	VII	100		
1917-06-07	La Libertad	6.2–6.5	VIII	1,050		Severe damage
1873-03-19	San Salvador	7.3		57		
1859-08-12	La Libertad	7.3	VII			Severe damage
1854-04-16	San Salvador	6.5–6.6		<100	~50	Severe damage
1831-02-07	San Salvador	7.1				
1783-11-29	San Vicente	7.6				
1776-05-30	San Salvador	7.5				
1719-06-03	San Salvador	7.0		7		
1625	San Salvador		IX			Severe damage
1594-04-21	San Salvador			13		
1575-05-23	San Salvador			3		Severe damage
The inclusion criteria for adding events are based on WikiProject Earthquakes' notability guideline that was developed for stand alone articles. The principles described are also applicable to lists. In summary, only damaging, injurious, or deadly events should be recorded.

== See also ==
- Geology of El Salvador
