= Creepmeter =

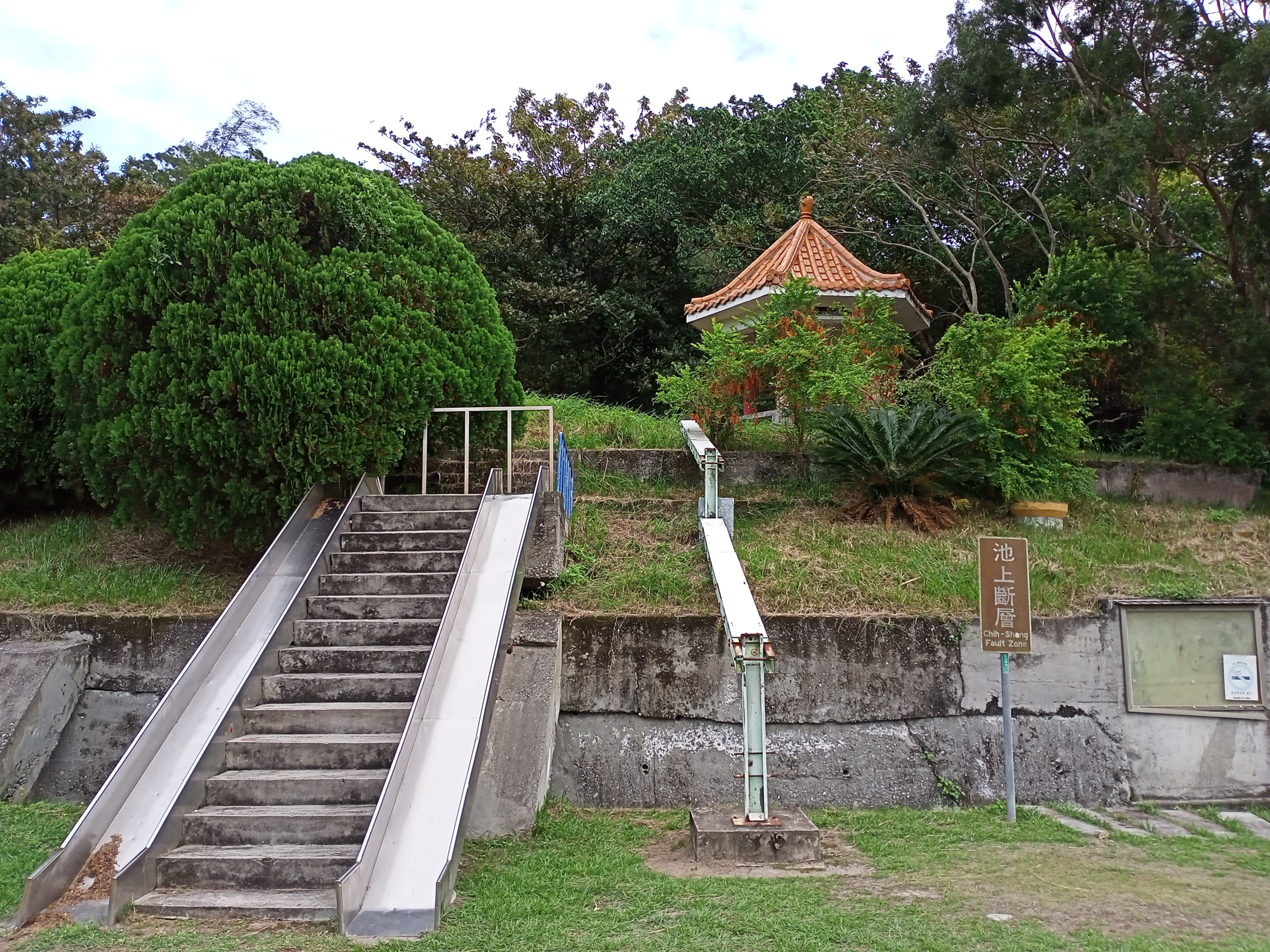
A rod-type creepmeter for measurement of displacement in the active fault zone (Chihshang Fault)

A creepmeter is an instrument that monitors the slow surface displacement of an active geologic fault in the Earth. Its function is to record the slow, aseismic creep between earthquakes. Creepmeters are used in various countries in areas of active tectonic plate movement.

== Instrumentation ==
The creepmeter is installed across the fault and securely fixed. The device continuously monitors the displacement between two reference points, determines the rate and degree of creep. The device has invar, quartz or carbon rods with a thickness of 6 mm to 12 mm, which are placed in a telescopic plastic sheath with low friction, and are firmly fixed to the concrete foundation on one side of the fault and pass through a PVC pipe to the opposite side of the fault. The length of the device depends on the geometry at each site and ranges from 2 to 9 m. The creepmeters are buried at a depth of 30–70 cm. The measurement range of a creepmeter is usually limited to 5–30 mm. The devices are equipped with satellite communication for data transmission.

== Geography of use ==
Approximately 40 creepmeters are in operation in California—most are operated by the United States Geological Survey (USGS), but nine are maintained by the University of Colorado. For a majority of the creepmeters, these data are automatically sent to the U.S. Geological Survey (USGS) offices where they are stored and processed.

Eleven instruments have been installed in Northern Chile, recording continuous or episodic displacements along a parallel trench of the Atacama fault system.

Creepmeter was installed across surface breaks of the Chihshang fault on the retaining wall of a water channel near the Chinyuan Village, eastern Taiwan.

Creepmeter was installed of the North Anatolian Fault in Northern Anatolia, Turkey.
