= 1951 East Rift Valley earthquakes =

Earthquakes in Taiwan

- Location within Taiwan
- UTC time
- A: 1951-10-21 21:34:21
- B: 1951-10-22 03:29:35
- C: 1951-11-24 18:47:18
- D: 1951-11-24 18:50:24
- ISC event
- A: 894821
- B: 894824
- C: 894987
- D: 894988
- USGS-ANSS
- A: ComCat
- B: ComCat
- C: ComCat
- D: ComCat
- Local date: October 22, 1951 to December 5, 1951
- Magnitude
- A: 7.3 M_{S}, 7.5 M_{w}
- B: 7.1 M_{S}, 7.2 M_{w}
- C: 7.1 M_{S}, 7.3 M_{w}
- D: 7.3 M_{S}, 7.8 M_{w}
- Epicenter: 23.9°N 121.7°E
- Areas affected: Taiwan
- Tsunami: minor
- Casualties: 85 dead

The 1951 East Rift Valley earthquakes (Chinese: 1951年縱谷地震系列; pinyin: 1951 nián Zònggǔ dìzhèn xìliè) were a series of earthquakes which struck eastern Taiwan from 22 October 1951 to 5 December 1951, four of which registered at 7 or greater on the moment magnitude scale, the largest of those being magnitude 7.3 and 7.8 quakes on November 24. Altogether the quakes killed 85 people.

== Technical data ==
The East Rift Valley (Chinese: 花東縱谷; pinyin: Huā-Dōng Zònggǔ) is an area of rugged terrain formed by the interaction of the Philippine Sea and Eurasian tectonic plates in eastern Taiwan. Most of the area is sparsely populated by Taiwanese aborigines, but there are larger populations in the cities of Hualien and Taitung. The deadliest earthquake in the series struck at 05:34 on 22 October 1951, with an epicentre at 23.9°N 121.7°E, a few kilometres southwest of Hualien City, with a magnitude of 7.3, and was felt throughout Taiwan as well as on Penghu and Kinmen (Quemoy). The second quake to cause significant casualties hit at 02:50 on November 25 of the same year, again with a magnitude of 7.3, this time centred under the town of Yuli, Hualien.

== Earthquakes ==
Date (YYYY-MM-DD)	Time (UTC)	Latitude	Longitude	Depth	Magnitude	Source
1951-10-21	21:34:21	23.487° N	121.400° E	25 km (16 mi)	7.5 (M_{w})	
1951-10-22	03:29:35	23.917° N	121.343° E	25 km (16 mi)	7.2 (M_{w})	
1951-11-24	18:47:18	23.046° N	121.249° E	25 km (16 mi)	7.3 (M_{w})	
1951-11-24	18:50:24	23.092° N	121.214° E	30 km (19 mi)	7.8 (M_{w})	

== Names ==
The earthquake series is sometimes known by different names, including the 1951 Hualien earthquakes (Chinese: 1951年花蓮大地震系列; pinyin: 1951 nián Huālián dà dìzhèn xìliè) and the 1951 Hualien-Taitung earthquakes (Chinese: 1951年花蓮–台東地震系列; pinyin: 1951 nián Huālián-Táidōng dìzhèn xìliè) – both of these refer to the same series of quakes in eastern Taiwan from October to December 1951.

== Damage ==
The total figures for casualties and damage from Taiwan's Central Weather Bureau are as follows:

- 85 deaths
- 200 seriously injured
- 1,000 lightly injured
- Around 3,000 dwellings completely destroyed

== See also ==
- Chihshang fault
- List of earthquakes in 1951
- List of earthquakes in Taiwan
