= 1965 San Salvador earthquake =

1965 earthquake in Central America

- Location within El Salvador
- UTC time: 1965-05-03 10:01:38
- ISC event: 856602
- USGS-ANSS: ComCat
- Local date: May 3, 1965
- Local time: 04:01 CST
- Magnitude: 5.9 M_{w}
- Depth: 15.0 km (9.3 mi)
- Epicenter: 13.683°N 89.070°W
- Areas affected: El Salvador
- Max. intensity: MMI VIII (Severe)
- Casualties: 125 dead, 500 injured

The 1965 San Salvador earthquake occurred at 04:01 in the morning on May 3, 1965. It had a moment magnitude of 5.9 and a maximum Mercalli intensity of VIII (Severe). The shock caused severe damage to El Salvador's capital city, San Salvador. The town of Ilopango, Soyapango, and Delgado was also hard hit. The earthquake was the most destructive to affect the city prior to the 1986 earthquake.

== Tectonic setting ==
El Salvador lies above the convergent boundary where oceanic crust of the Cocos plate is being subducted beneath the Caribbean plate at rate of about 72 mm per year along the Middle America Trench. This boundary is associated with earthquakes resulting from movement on the plate interface itself, such as the M_{w} 7.7 1992 Nicaragua earthquake, and from faulting within both the overriding Caribbean plate and the subducting Cocos plate, such as the 1982 El Salvador earthquake.

== Damage and casualties ==
The earthquake left 125 people dead across the San Salvador metropolitan area. A total of 53 million colones in damages was inflicted. Some damage was so serious that the demolition of the Central Penitentiary and the Ilopango Airport was necessary. Other public and private structures such as the Isidro Menéndez Judicial Center and the Women's Prison were partially damaged. Eventually, it was reported that some buildings only underwent remodeling works, such is the case of the Rubén Darío Building, whose walls were crossed by large cracks and fissures.

The shaking was quick and violent, and many people did not have time to leave their homes. Most buildings in the capital were built out of adobe, which lead to many deaths and hundreds of injuries.

== See also ==
- 1986 San Salvador earthquake
- List of earthquakes in 1965
- List of earthquakes in El Salvador
