= 1965 Rat Islands earthquake =

Megathrust earthquake in the Aleutian Islands

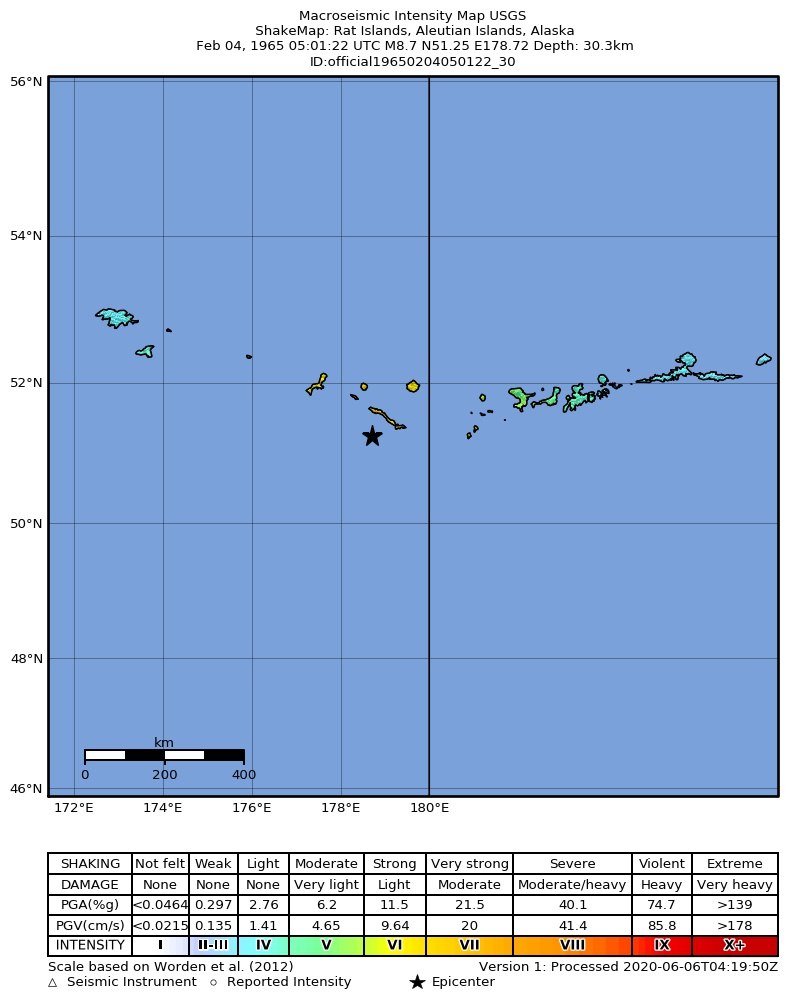
- USGS ShakeMap

- Location within Alaska
- UTC time: 1965-02-04 05:01:22
- ISC event: 859206
- USGS-ANSS: ComCat
- Local date: February 3, 1965; 61 years ago
- Local time: 19:01:22
- Magnitude: 8.7 M_{w}
- Depth: 30.3 km (19 mi)
- Epicenter: 51.29°N 178.55°E
- Areas affected: United States (Alaska)
- Total damage: $10,000
- Max. intensity: MMI VI (Strong)
- Tsunami: 10.7 m (35 ft)

The 1965 Rat Islands earthquake occurred at 05:01 UTC, on 4 February (19:01, 3 February local time). It had a magnitude of 8.7, making it one of the largest earthquakes in recorded history, and triggered a tsunami of over 10 m on Shemya Island, but caused very little damage.

== Tectonic setting ==
The Rat Islands form part of the Aleutian Islands, a chain of volcanic islands forming an island arc, that results from the subduction of the Pacific plate beneath the North American plate. This plate boundary, the Aleutian Trench, has been the location of many megathrust earthquakes.

== Characteristics ==
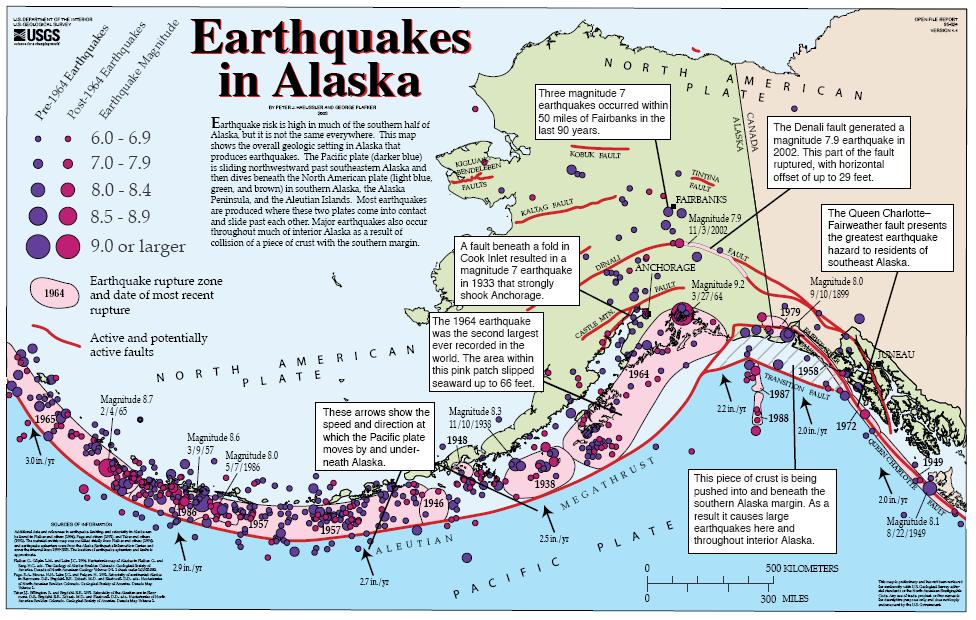
Map showing the tectonics and seismicity of Alaska

The 1965 Rat Islands earthquake share common features with the 1963 Kuril Islands earthquake and the 1964 Alaska earthquake.

=== Earthquake ===
The earthquake was associated with a 600 km long rupture along the plate boundary, based on the distribution of aftershocks. The pattern of energy release suggest the presence of three asperities along the plate interface, each causing a pulse of moment release. Modelling of the tsunami supports the idea that the earthquake consisted of three sub-events, related to three structural 'blocks' within the overriding plate.

The main shock was followed by an earthquake of magnitude 7.6 nearly two months later, that triggered a small tsunami. This was not an aftershock, but a normal fault event within the outer rise of the subducting plate, triggered by the earlier event.

=== Tsunami ===
The tsunami had a maximum run-up height of 10.7 m on Shemya Island, 2.0 m at Amchitka Island, 1.6 m at Attu Island and 1.1 m in northern Kauai, Hawaii. It was also observed in Peru, Ecuador, Mexico, California, Japan and eastern Russia.

== Damage ==
Flooding from the tsunami caused $10,000 worth of damage on Amchitka Island. Minor damage from the earthquake was recorded on both Attu and Shemya islands in the form of cracks in runways.

== See also ==
- 2021 Chignik earthquake
- List of earthquakes in 1965
- List of earthquakes in Alaska
- List of earthquakes in the United States
