= List of earthquakes in 1965 =

Earthquakes in 1965
Approximate epicenters of the earthquakes in 1965
- 4.0–5.9 magnitude
- 6.0–6.9 magnitude
- 7.0–7.9 magnitude
- 8.0+ magnitude
- Strongest magnitude: United States, Rat Islands, Alaska (Magnitude 8.7) February 4
- Deadliest: Chile, Valparaíso Region (Magnitude 7.4) March 28 400 deaths
- Total fatalities: 669

Number by magnitude
- 9.0+: 0

This is a list of earthquakes in 1965. Only magnitude 6.0 or greater earthquakes appear on the list. Lower magnitude events are included if they have caused death, injury or damage. Events which occurred in remote areas will be excluded from the list as they would not have generated significant media interest. All dates are listed according to UTC time. Maximum intensities are indicated on the Mercalli intensity scale and are sourced from United States Geological Survey (USGS) ShakeMap data. A fairly busy year with 18 magnitude 7.0+ events. Two of these were above magnitude 8 and struck within 10 days of each other. The largest of the year was a magnitude 8.7 which struck the Rat Islands, Alaska in February. No deaths were reported from this event. New Hebrides had a series of destructive events in August. Of the 667 deaths in 1965, most came from an event in Chile in March which had 400 fatalities.

== Overall ==
=== By death toll ===
Rank	Death toll	Magnitude	Location	MMI	Depth (km)	Date
1	400	7.4	Chile, Valparaíso Region	VIII (Severe)	70.0	March 28
2	125	5.9	El Salvador, San Salvador Department	VI (Strong)	15.0	May 3
3	71	8.2	Indonesia, western Ceram Sea	VIII (Severe)	20.0	January 24
4	32	6.1	Greece, Peloponnese (region)	X (Extreme)	20.0	April 5
5	20	5.1	Iran, East Azerbaijan province	-	52.0	February 10

- Note: At least 10 casualties

=== By magnitude ===
Rank	Magnitude	Death toll	Location	MMI	Depth (km)	Date
1	8.7	0	United States, Rat Islands, Alaska	X (Extreme)	30.3	February 4
2	8.2	71	Indonesia, western Ceram Sea	VIII (Severe)	20.0	January 24
3	7.8	0	United States, Fox Islands (Alaska)	VII (Very strong)	45.0	July 2
= 4	7.7	0	United States, Rat Islands, Alaska	V (Moderate)	20.0	March 30
= 4	7.7	0	New Hebrides, Vanuatu	VII (Very strong)	120.0	May 20
5	7.6	0	New Hebrides, Vanuatu	IX (Violent)	30.0	August 11
= 6	7.4	0	Afghanistan, Badakhshan Province	VI (Strong)	207.8	March 14
= 6	7.4	400	Chile, Valparaíso Region	VIII (Severe)	70.0	March 28
= 6	7.4	0	New Hebrides, Vanuatu	VIII (Severe)	25.0	August 13
= 6	7.4	6	Mexico, Oaxaca	VIII (Severe)	25.0	August 23
= 7	7.3	0	United States, Rat Islands, Alaska	I (Not felt)	30.0	February 4
= 7	7.3	0	Australia south of Macquarie Island	I (Not felt)	10.0	August 2
= 8	7.2	0	Soviet Union, Kuril Islands, Russia	VI (Strong)	58.0	June 11
= 8	7.2	0	New Hebrides, Espiritu Santo, Vanuatu	IX (Violent)	25.0	August 11
= 8	7.2	0	New Hebrides, Vanuatu	VII (Very strong)	35.0	August 13
= 9	7.0	1	Chile, off the coast of Antofagasta Region	VII (Very strong)	35.0	February 23
= 9	7.0	0	Soviet Union, Kuril Islands, Russia	VI (Strong)	40.7	June 11
= 9	7.0	0	United States, Kodiak Island, Alaska	VII (Very strong)	27.8	September 4

- Note: At least 7.0 magnitude

== Notable events ==
=== January ===
January
- Strongest magnitude: 8.2 M_{w} Indonesia
- Deadliest: 8.2 M_{w} Indonesia; 71 deaths
- Total fatalities: 75

Number by magnitude
- 8.0–8.9: 1
- 7.0–7.9: 0
- 6.0–6.9: 2
- 5.0–5.9: 2

Date	Country and location	M_{w}	Depth (km)	MMI	Notes	Casualties	
Date	Country and location	M_{w}	Depth (km)	MMI	Notes	Dead	Injured
1	Algeria, M'Sila Province	5.5	10.0		4 people were killed and 350 were injured. Damage costs reached $2 million (1965 rate) and 2,500 homes were destroyed.	4	350
5	Tonga	6.2	20.0				
10	New Hebrides, Vanuatu	6.7	35.0	VI			
12	China, Shanxi Province	5.5	10.0	VII	Many homes were destroyed.		
24	Indonesia, western Ceram Sea	8.2	20.0	VIII	71 people were killed and 3,000 homes destroyed in the 1965 Ceram Sea earthquake. A tsunami was generated which caused much of the damage.	71	

=== February ===
February
- Strongest magnitude: 8.7 M_{w} United States
- Deadliest: 5.1 M_{w} Iran; 20 deaths
- Total fatalities: 21

Number by magnitude
- 8.0–8.9: 1
- 7.0–7.9: 2
- 6.0–6.9: 4
- 5.0–5.9: 1

Date	Country and location	M_{w}	Depth (km)	MMI	Notes	Casualties	
Date	Country and location	M_{w}	Depth (km)	MMI	Notes	Dead	Injured
2	Soviet Union, Gorno-Badakhshan Autonomous Region, Tajikistan	6.0	15.0	VI			
4	United States, Rat Islands, Alaska	8.7	30.3	VI	The 1965 Rat Islands earthquake was one of the largest on record. Despite this only minor damage was caused due to the remote location. A tsunami was triggered. Property damage costs were $10,000 (1965 rate). Several large aftershocks followed. Only magnitude 6.5+ events will be listed to prevent cluttering.		
4	United States, Rat Islands, Alaska	7.3	30.0		Aftershock.		
4	United States, Near Islands, Alaska	6.5	30.0		Aftershock.		
10	Iran, East Azerbaijan province	5.1	52.0		20 people died and major damage was caused.	20	
23	Chile, off the coast of Antofagasta Region	7.0	35.0	VII	1 person was killed and 5 were injured. Damage was caused in the area.	1	5
25	Australia, East New Britain Province, Papua New Guinea	6.2	40.0	VII			
27	Mexico, Gulf of California	6.0	10.0				

=== March ===
March
- Strongest magnitude: 7.7 M_{w} United States
- Deadliest: 7.4 M_{w} Chile; 400 deaths
- Total fatalities: 408

Number by magnitude
- 8.0–8.9: 0
- 7.0–7.9: 3
- 6.0–6.9: 8

Date	Country and location	M_{w}	Depth (km)	MMI	Notes	Casualties	
Date	Country and location	M_{w}	Depth (km)	MMI	Notes	Dead	Injured
3	Australia, East New Britain Province, Papua and New Guinea	6.7	14.8	VII			
9	Greece, Aegean Sea	6.1	15.0	VII	2 people were killed and major damage was caused. Costs were $8 million (1965 rate).	2	
14	Afghanistan, Badakhshan Province	7.4	207.8	VII	2 injuries were caused and some damage was reported.		2
19	Indonesia, West Sulawesi	6.0	40.0	VI			
21	Indonesia, southern Molucca Sea	6.3	28.9	VI	Aftershock of January 24 event.		
22	Tonga	6.5	30.5				
22	Chile, off the coast of Coquimbo Region	6.2	48.8	VI			
23	Tonga	6.2	25.0		Aftershock.		
28	Chile, Valparaíso Region	7.4	70.0	VIII	400 people were killed in the 1965 Valparaíso earthquake and the El Cobre dam failures. 350 people were injured in the surrounding region by damaged buildings and fires. A dam collapsed sending a torrent of water onto a village called El Cobre. Costs were $125 million (1965 rate).	400	350
30	United States, Rat Islands, Alaska	7.7	20.0	V	Aftershock.		
31	Greece, Gulf of Corinth	6.8	75.0	X	6 deaths were caused as well as some property damage.	6	

=== April ===
April
- Strongest magnitude: 6.7 M_{w} United States
- Deadliest: 6.1 M_{w} Greece; 32 deaths
- Total fatalities: 40

Number by magnitude
- 8.0–8.9: 0
- 7.0–7.9: 0
- 6.0–6.9: 9

Date	Country and location	M_{w}	Depth (km)	MMI	Notes	Casualties	
Date	Country and location	M_{w}	Depth (km)	MMI	Notes	Dead	Injured
5	Greece, Peloponnese (region)	6.1	20.0	X	32 people were killed and 200 were injured. Many homes were destroyed.	32	200
6	Indonesia, Central Sulawesi	6.2	25.0	VI			
9	Greece, south of Crete	6.2	65.0	V			
10	United Kingdom, Fiji	6.5	543.7				
16	United States, central Alaska	6.0	15.0	VI			
19	Japan, Shizuoka Prefecture, Honshu	6.0	35.0	VI	1 person died and another 4 were hurt. Some damage was caused.	1	4
26	Taiwan, south of	6.1	37.1				
27	Greece, northwest of Crete	6.1	60.0	V			
29	United States, Tacoma, Washington	6.7	59.0	VIII	7 people were killed in the 1965 Puget Sound earthquake. Extensive damage was caused with costs being maximum $28 million (1965 rate).	7	

=== May ===
May
- Strongest magnitude: 7.7 M_{w} New Hebrides, Vanuatu
- Deadliest: 5.9 M_{w} El Salvador; 125 deaths
- Total fatalities: 125

Number by magnitude
- 8.0–8.9: 0
- 7.0–7.9: 1
- 6.0–6.9: 2
- 5.0–5.9: 1

Date	Country and location	M_{w}	Depth (km)	MMI	Notes	Casualties	
Date	Country and location	M_{w}	Depth (km)	MMI	Notes	Dead	Injured
3	El Salvador, San Salvador Department	5.9	15.0	VI	The 1965 San Salvador earthquake killed 125 people and injured at least 500. Major damage was reported with $35 million (1965 rate) in costs.	125	500
4	China, Soviet Union, border region of China and Kyrgyzstan	6.2	10.0	VII			
17	Taiwan, off the east coast	6.7	68.4	VI			
20	New Hebrides, Vanuatu	7.7	120.0	VII			

=== June ===
June
- Strongest magnitude: 7.2 M_{w} Soviet Union, Russia
- Deadliest: 5.9 M_{w} Turkey; 2 deaths
- Total fatalities: 2

Number by magnitude
- 8.0–8.9: 0
- 7.0–7.9: 2
- 6.0–6.9: 3
- 5.0–5.9: 2

Date	Country and location	M_{w}	Depth (km)	MMI	Notes	Casualties	
Date	Country and location	M_{w}	Depth (km)	MMI	Notes	Dead	Injured
11	Soviet Union, Kuril Islands, Russia	7.0	40.7	rowspan="2"| Doublet earthquake. Next event was less than 20 seconds later.			
11	Soviet Union, Kuril Islands, Russia	7.2	58.0	VI			
13	Turkey, Denizli Province	5.9	25.0	VI	2 deaths were reported and 200 homes were wrecked.	2	
21	Iran, Hormozgan province	5.9	25.0	VII	Major damage was caused.		
22	Philippines, south of Mindanao	6.3	40.0	V			
23	United States, south of Kodiak Island, Alaska	6.5	20.0				
27	United States, southern Alaska	6.5	15.0				

=== July ===
July
- Strongest magnitude: 7.8 M_{w} United States
- Deadliest: 6.3 M_{w} Greece; 2 deaths
- Total fatalities: 2

Number by magnitude
- 8.0–8.9: 0
- 7.0–7.9: 1
- 6.0–6.9: 3
- 5.0–5.9: 1

Date	Country and location	M_{w}	Depth (km)	MMI	Notes	Casualties	
Date	Country and location	M_{w}	Depth (km)	MMI	Notes	Dead	Injured
2	United States, Fox Islands (Alaska)	7.8	45.0	VII	Some damage was reported. A tsunami was recorded in the area.		
3	China, Yunnan Province	5.9	35.0	VII	Some property damage was caused.		
6	Greece, Central Greece (region)	6.3	20.0	VIII	2 people were killed in total. 1 in the earthquake and another in a tsunami. 6 people were injured. Some damage was caused.	2	6
15	Philippines, Mindanao	6.0	570.0	II			
29	United States, Fox Islands (Alaska)	6.8	21.4				

=== August ===
August
- Strongest magnitude: 7.6 M_{w} New Hebrides, Vanuatu
- Deadliest: 7.4 M_{w} Mexico; 6 deaths
- Total fatalities: 6

Number by magnitude
- 8.0–8.9: 0
- 7.0–7.9: 6
- 6.0–6.9: 9

Date	Country and location	M_{w}	Depth (km)	MMI	Notes	Casualties	
Date	Country and location	M_{w}	Depth (km)	MMI	Notes	Dead	Injured
2	Australia, south of Macquarie Island	7.3	10.0				
5	Australia, East New Britain Province, Papua and New Guinea	6.5	60.0	VI			
11	New Hebrides, Espiritu Santo, Vanuatu	7.2	25.0	IX	The beginning of a series of large and destructive events. Events measuring below magnitude 6.5 will be excluded to avoid cluttering.		
11	New Hebrides, Malo Island, Vanuatu	6.9	30.0	VII	Foreshock.		
11	New Hebrides, Vanuatu	7.6	30.0	IX	Mainshock of series. Some homes were damaged.		
12	New Hebrides, Vanuatu	6.9	30.0	VI	Part of ongoing series.		
12	Australia, East New Britain Province, Papua and New Guinea	6.8	51.0	VI			
13	New Hebrides, Vanuatu	7.4	25.0	VIII	Part of ongoing series.		
13	New Hebrides, Vanuatu	7.2	35.0	VIII	This event came within 22 seconds of the previous event. A tsunami was generated resulting in some homes being destroyed.		
13	Australia, south of New Britain, Papua and New Guinea	6.0	30.0	IV			
17	Indonesia, northern Sumatra	6.1	65.0	V			
20	Indonesia, Banda Sea	6.7	330.0				
20	Bolivia, Oruro Department	6.7	124.0	VI			
23	Turkey, off the west coast of	6.0	15.0	VI			
23	Mexico, Oaxaca	7.4	25.0	VIII	The 1965 Oaxaca earthquake left 6 people dead. Some homes were damaged.	6	

=== September ===
September
- Strongest magnitude: 7.0 M_{w} United States
- Total fatalities: 0

Number by magnitude
- 8.0–8.9: 0
- 7.0–7.9: 1
- 6.0–6.9: 7

Date	Country and location	M_{w}	Depth (km)	MMI	Notes	Casualties	
Date	Country and location	M_{w}	Depth (km)	MMI	Notes	Dead	Injured
4	United States, Kodiak Island, Alaska	7.0	27.8	VII			
16	Philippines, Mindanao	6.0	160.0	IV			
17	Ecuador, Pastaza Province	6.5	185.9				
17	Japan, off the east coast of Honshu	6.8	35.0	VII			
18	Philippines, east of Mindanao	6.0	25.0	IV			
21	Japan, Ryukyu Islands	6.7	197.6				
22	Japan, off the east coast of Honshu	6.3	35.0	VI	Aftershock.		
28	New Zealand, Kermadec Islands	6.5	25.0				

=== October ===
October
- Strongest magnitude: 6.8 M_{w} United States
- Total fatalities: 0

Number by magnitude
- 8.0–8.9: 0
- 7.0–7.9: 0
- 6.0–6.9: 3

Date	Country and location	M_{w}	Depth (km)	MMI	Notes	Casualties	
Date	Country and location	M_{w}	Depth (km)	MMI	Notes	Dead	Injured
1	United States, south of the Aleutian Islands, Alaska	6.8	19.7				
18	Indonesia, Obi Islands	6.3	25.0	VII			
25	Japan, Hokkaido	6.7	170.0	V			

=== November ===
November
- Strongest magnitude: 6.7 M_{w} Brazil
- Total fatalities: 0

Number by magnitude
- 8.0–8.9: 0
- 7.0–7.9: 0
- 6.0–6.9: 5

Date	Country and location	M_{w}	Depth (km)	MMI	Notes	Casualties	
Date	Country and location	M_{w}	Depth (km)	MMI	Notes	Dead	Injured
3	Brazil, Acre (state)	6.7	593.8				
13	China, Xinjiang Province	6.5	35.0	VIII	Many homes were destroyed.		
18	United Kingdom, Fiji	6.5	430.0				
21	Indonesia, Banda Sea	6.5	133.3				
28	Chile, Aysén Region	6.2	25.0	VII			

=== December ===
December
- Strongest magnitude: 6.7 M_{w} Mexico
- Total fatalities: 0

Number by magnitude
- 8.0–8.9: 0
- 7.0–7.9: 0
- 6.0–6.9: 6

Date	Country and location	M_{w}	Depth (km)	MMI	Notes	Casualties	
Date	Country and location	M_{w}	Depth (km)	MMI	Notes	Dead	Injured
6	Mexico, off the coast of Jalisco	6.7	25.0				
7	Australia, Morobe Province, Papua and New Guinea	6.3	122.5	V			
8	New Zealand, north of North Island	6.0	175.0				
9	Mexico, Guerrero	6.4	35.0	VI			
15	Panama, south of	6.3	25.0	VII			
22	United States, north of Kodiak Island, Alaska	6.1	52.4	V			
