= 1965 Ceram Sea earthquake =

Earthquake in Indonesia

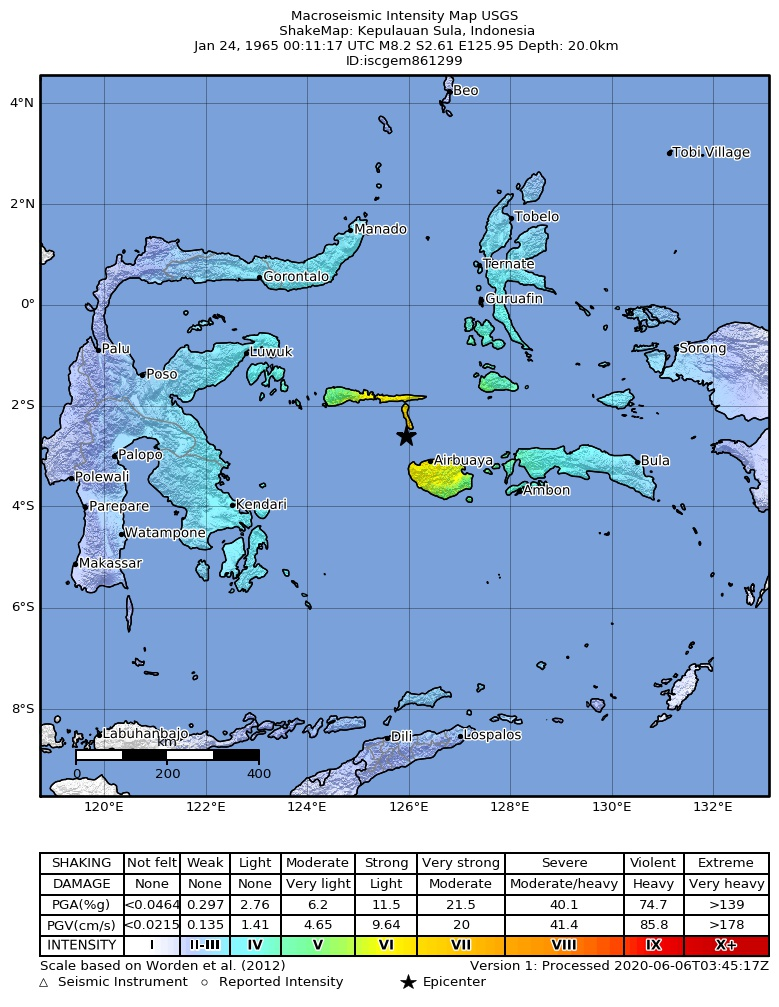
- USGS ShakeMap

- Location within Sulawesi
- UTC time: 1965-01-24 00:11:17
- ISC event: 861299
- USGS-ANSS: ComCat
- Local date: January 24, 1965
- Local time: 09:11:17 IEST
- Magnitude: 8.2 M_{w}
- Depth: 28.4 km (17.6 mi)
- Epicenter: 2.455°S 125.965°E
- Type: Oblique-reverse
- Areas affected: Indonesia
- Max. intensity: MMI VIII (Severe)
- Tsunami: yes
- Casualties: 71 dead

The 1965 Ceram Sea earthquake occurred on January 24 at 00:11 UTC with a moment magnitude of 8.2 and its epicenter was located just off the southwestern coast of Sanana Island in eastern Indonesia. The event occurred at a depth of 28 kilometers under the Ceram Sea, and a tsunami was generated which caused damage in Sanana, Buru, and Mangole. During the tsunami three consecutive run-ups were reported in Seram Island, and a four-meter run-up was reported at Buru Island.

A series of tremors were reported during the week leading up to the mainshock. The number of people reported dead was 71 and up to 3,000 buildings and a total of 14 bridges were destroyed by both the earthquake and tsunami on Sanana.

== Cause of earthquake/tsunami ==
The 1965 Ceram Sea earthquake was caused by a convergent plate boundary located near Indonesia. A convergent plate boundary is where a denser oceanic plate is forced under a continental plate in a process known as subduction. When the earthquake occurred, the plates shifted releasing massive amounts of energy and causing a large displacement of water. This water then moves very fast towards land until it approaches the shore, where wave shoaling builds up the height of the tsunami. This added height from the friction of the shoreline allows the wave to travel far inland wreaking havoc on communities. This tsunami, in combination with the earthquake, is responsible for the 71 deaths. Indonesia is especially susceptible to earthquakes and tsunamis in large part due to its proximity to the Ring of Fire, an area notable for high levels of seismic activity. Events such as tsunamis cause massive amounts of physical and economic damage to regions such as Indonesia.

== See also ==
- List of earthquakes in 1965
- List of earthquakes in Indonesia
