= List of earthquakes in 1951 =

Earthquakes in 1951
Approximate epicenters of the earthquakes in 1951
- 4.0–5.9 magnitude
- 6.0–6.9 magnitude
- 7.0–7.9 magnitude
- 8.0+ magnitude
- Strongest: Taiwan, Hualien County (Magnitude 7.8) November 24
- Deadliest: El Salvador, off the coast of (Magnitude 6.5) May 6, 1,100 deaths
- Total fatalities: 2,236

Number by magnitude
- 9.0+: 0

This is a list of earthquakes in 1951. Only magnitude 6.0 or greater earthquakes appear on the list. Lower magnitude events are included if they have caused death, injury or damage. Events which occurred in remote areas will be excluded from the list as they wouldn't have generated significant media interest. All dates are listed according to UTC time. Once again a very active year. One major series of earthquakes in Taiwan in October and November helped towards the upheaval. This series resulted in around 85 deaths in all. The main quakes causing most of the deaths shook neighboring parts of Central America with El Salvador in May (1,100 deaths) and Nicaragua in August (1,000 deaths) being affected. Aside from this activity China, Russia and the southwest Pacific islands saw magnitude 7.0+ quakes.

== Overall ==
=== By death toll ===
Rank	Death toll	Magnitude	Location	MMI	Depth (km)	Date
1	1,100	6.5	El Salvador, offshore	( )	85.0	May 6
2	1,000	6.1	Honduras, Gulf of Fonseca	VI (Strong)	15.0	August 3
3	68	7.0	Taiwan, Hualien County	VII (Very strong)	20.0	October 22
4	50	7.0	Turkey, Karabuk Province	IX (Violent)	25.0	August 13
5	17	7.3	Taiwan, Taitung County	VII (Very strong)	25.0	November 24

- Note: At least 10 casualties

=== By magnitude ===
Rank	Magnitude	Death toll	Location	MMI	Depth (km)	Date
1	7.8	0	Taiwan, Hualien County	VII (Very strong)	30.0	November 24
2	7.7	0	China, Xizang Province	VII (Very strong)	30.0	November 18
= 3	7.5	0	Afghanistan, Badakhshan Province	( )	215.6	January 6
= 3	7.5	0	Afghanistan, Badakhshan Province	( )	221.9	June 12
= 3	7.5	0	Taiwan, Hualien County	VII (Very strong)	25.0	October 21
= 3	7.5	0	Southwest Indian Ridge	( )	15.0	December 8
= 4	7.3	0	Australia, Morobe Province, Papua and New Guinea	( )	180.0	February 17
= 4	7.3	17	Taiwan, Taitung County	VII (Very strong)	25.0	November 24
= 5	7.2	0	New Hebrides, Vanuatu	( )	101.0	March 10
= 5	7.2	0	Taiwan, Hualien County	VII (Very strong)	25.0	October 22
= 6	7.1	0	Russian Soviet Federative Socialist Republic, Sakha Republic	VIII (Severe)	10.0	April 14
= 6	7.1	0	Japan, Bonin Islands	( )	496.7	July 11
= 7	7.0	0	New Zealand, Kermadec Islands	( )	220.0	March 23
= 7	7.0	0	Australia, west of Bougainville Island, Papua and New Guinea	( )	149.8	May 21
= 7	7.0	50	Turkey, Karabuk Province	IX (Violent)	25.0	August 13
= 7	7.0	68	Taiwan, Hualien County	VII (Very strong)	20.0	October 22
= 7	7.0	0	Russian Soviet Federative Socialist Republic, Kuril Islands	( )	35.0	November 6

- Note: At least 7.0 magnitude

== Notable events ==
=== January ===
January
- Strongest: 7.5 M_{w} Afghanistan
- Total fatalities: 0

Number by magnitude
- 8.0–8.9: 0
- 7.0–7.9: 1
- 6.0–6.9: 9

Date	Country and location	M_{w}	Depth (km)	MMI	Notes	Casualties	
Date	Country and location	M_{w}	Depth (km)	MMI	Notes	Dead	Injured
3	Chile, Araucanía Region	6.2	35.0	VI			
6	Afghanistan, Badakhshan Province	7.5	215.6				
6	Panama, off the south coast of	6.6	54.4	VI			
8	Japan, Chiba Prefecture, Honshu	6.1	55.0	V			
8	Australia, off the north coast of New Britain, Papua and New Guinea	6.9	0.0		Unknown depth.		
15	New Hebrides, Vanuatu	6.5	88.3				
15	Indonesia, south of West Papua (province)	6.3	15.0				
22	Mozambique Channel	6.1	15.0	V			
24	Mexico, Baja California	6.0	6.0	VIII			
28	Taiwan, east of	6.1	15.0				

=== February ===
February
- Strongest: 7.3 M_{w} Australia
- Total fatalities: 0

Number by magnitude
- 8.0–8.9: 0
- 7.0–7.9: 1
- 6.0–6.9: 6

Date	Country and location	M_{w}	Depth (km)	MMI	Notes	Casualties	
Date	Country and location	M_{w}	Depth (km)	MMI	Notes	Dead	Injured
10	New Zealand, Hawke's Bay, North Island	6.3	15.0	VI			
12	Russian Soviet Federative Socialist Republic, Sakha Republic	6.5	10.0	VIII			
13	Indonesia, Batu Islands	6.0	25.0				
13	Tonga	6.9	249.9				
13	United States, south of the Alaska Peninsula	6.9	20.0				
17	Australia, Morobe Province, Papua and New Guinea	7.3	180.0				
22	Australia, Sandaun Province, Papua and New Guinea	6.1	25.0	VI			

=== March ===
March
- Strongest: 7.2 M_{w} New Hebrides
- Total fatalities: 0

Number by magnitude
- 8.0–8.9: 0
- 7.0–7.9: 2
- 6.0–6.9: 8

Date	Country and location	M_{w}	Depth (km)	MMI	Notes	Casualties	
Date	Country and location	M_{w}	Depth (km)	MMI	Notes	Dead	Injured
5	Japan, Ryukyu Islands	6.9	168.9				
9	Indonesia, Savu Sea	6.7	35.0	VI			
10	New Hebrides, Vanuatu	7.2	101.0				
10	Japan, off the northeast coast of Honshu	6.1	64.4				
12	India, Arunachal Pradesh	6.0	25.0	VII			
17	China, eastern Xizang Province	6.2	15.0	VII			
19	Portugal, Inhambane Province, Mozambique	6.0	15.0	VII			
19	Russian Soviet Federative Socialist Republic, Kamchatka Krai	6.1	15.0				
23	New Zealand, Kermadec Islands	7.0	220.0				
24	United Kingdom, Santa Cruz Islands, Solomon Islands	6.9	157.7				

=== April ===
April
- Strongest: 7.1 M_{w} Russian Soviet Federative Socialist Republic
- Total fatalities: 0

Number by magnitude
- 8.0–8.9: 0
- 7.0–7.9: 1
- 6.0–6.9: 12

Date	Country and location	M_{w}	Depth (km)	MMI	Notes	Casualties	
Date	Country and location	M_{w}	Depth (km)	MMI	Notes	Dead	Injured
2	El Salvador, off the coast	6.0	55.0	V			
2	Australia, West New Britain Province, Papua and New Guinea	6.1	60.0	VI			
13	Indonesia, south of Sumba	6.3	25.0	VI			
14	Argentina, Jujuy Province	6.8	185.2				
14	Tajik Soviet Socialist Republic, Districts of Republican Subordination	6.1	15.0	VI			
14	Russian Soviet Federative Socialist Republic, Sakha Republic, Russia	7.1	10.0	VIII			
14	India, Arunachal Pradesh	6.4	15.0	VII			
16	Japan, south of Honshu	6.8	471.1				
22	India, Arunachal Pradesh	6.0	25.0	VI			
23	United States, Hawaii (island), Hawaii	6.5	0.0	VII			
23	New Zealand, off the north coast of North Island	6.1	20.0	VI			
23	Bolivia, Potosi Department	6.4	247.7				
30	Australia, Solomon Sea, Papua and New Guinea	6.5	25.0				

=== May ===
May
- Strongest: 7.0 M_{w} Australia
- Deadliest: 6.5 M_{w} El Salvador; 1,100 deaths
- Total fatalities: 1,100

Number by magnitude
- 8.0–8.9: 0
- 7.0–7.9: 1
- 6.0–6.9: 11

Date	Country and location	M_{w}	Depth (km)	MMI	Notes	Casualties	
Date	Country and location	M_{w}	Depth (km)	MMI	Notes	Dead	Injured
6	El Salvador, Usulután Department	6.2	95.6		Foreshock.		
6	El Salvador, off the coast	6.5	85.0		Main article: 1951 El Salvador earthquake	1,100	
7	El Salvador, Usulután Department	6.0	115.0		Aftershock.		
10	Portugal, Sofala Province, Mozambique	6.1	25.0	VII			
10	Chile, off the coast of O'Higgins Region	6.1	32.7	VI			
15	Chile, Antofagasta Region	6.0	53.3	VI			
16	Indonesia, Molucca Sea	6.0	15.0				
21	Australia, Bougainville Island, Papua and New Guinea	7.0	149.8				
28	China, western Xizang Province	6.0	15.0	VI			
29	Indonesia, Papua (province)	6.3	25.0	VI			
30	Indonesia, north of Buru	6.1	35.0	VI			
31	Philippines, north of Luzon	6.2	61.4	VI			

=== June ===
June
- Strongest: 7.5 M_{w} Afghanistan
- Total fatalities: 0

Number by magnitude
- 8.0–8.9: 0
- 7.0–7.9: 1
- 6.0–6.9: 4

Date	Country and location	M_{w}	Depth (km)	MMI	Notes	Casualties	
Date	Country and location	M_{w}	Depth (km)	MMI	Notes	Dead	Injured
2	Malaysia, Sabah	6.1	15.0	VII			
5	Japan, southeast of the Ryukyu Islands	6.7	35.0	V			
12	Afghanistan, Badakhshan Province	7.5	221.9				
20	Taiwan, off the coast of Hualien, Taiwan	6.1	15.0	VI			
25	United States, southern Alaska	6.3	128.0	V			

=== July ===
July
- Strongest: 7.1 M_{w} Japan
- Deadliest: 6.0 M_{w} Mexico; 1 death
- Total fatalities: 1

Number by magnitude
- 8.0–8.9: 0
- 7.0–7.9: 1
- 6.0–6.9: 8

Date	Country and location	M_{w}	Depth (km)	MMI	Notes	Casualties	
Date	Country and location	M_{w}	Depth (km)	MMI	Notes	Dead	Injured
2	Philippines, off the south coast of Mindanao	6.0	25.0	VI			
2	Tonga, eastern Tongatapu	6.1	35.0				
8	Philippines, west of Negros (island)	6.5	25.0	VII			
9	Mexico, Oaxaca	6.0	25.0	VI	1 person was killed an some damage was caused.	1	
11	Japan, Bonin Islands	7.1	496.7				
16	Australia, Madang Province, Papua and New Guinea	6.5	96.4				
17	New Hebrides, Vanuatu	6.5	152.7				
25	Guatemala, Escuintla Department	6.2	100.0				
26	Japan, off the east coast of Honshu	6.1	45.0				

=== August ===
August
- Strongest: 7.0 M_{w} Turkey
- Deadliest: 6.1 M_{w} Honduras; 1,000 death
- Total fatalities: 1,050

Number by magnitude
- 8.0–8.9: 0
- 7.0–7.9: 1
- 6.0–6.9: 5
- 5.0–5.9: 1

Date	Country and location	M_{w}	Depth (km)	MMI	Notes	Casualties	
Date	Country and location	M_{w}	Depth (km)	MMI	Notes	Dead	Injured
3	Honduras, Gulf of Fonseca	6.1	15.0	VI	The earthquake caused the walls of Cosigüina volcano to collapse. The cascading water flooded neighboring towns. At least 1,000 deaths were reported as well as major damage.	1,000	
6	Nicaragua, off the west coast	5.6	55.0	IV	A number of homes were destroyed.		
12	Indonesia, Papua (province)	6.2	15.0	VI			
13	Turkey, Karabuk Province	7.0	25.0	IX	The 1951 Kursunlu earthquake left 50 people dead and caused major damage.	50	
18	Indonesia, Molucca Sea	6.1	30.0				
21	United States, Hawaii (island), Hawaii	6.9	0.0	VIII	2 people were hurt. Several buildings and infrastructure sustained varying degrees of damage.		2
24	Russian Soviet Federative Socialist Republic, Kuril Islands	6.5	166.8				

=== September ===
September
- Strongest: 6.8 M_{w} Fiji
- Total fatalities: 0

Number by magnitude
- 8.0–8.9: 0
- 7.0–7.9: 0
- 6.0–6.9: 2

Date	Country and location	M_{w}	Depth (km)	MMI	Notes	Casualties	
Date	Country and location	M_{w}	Depth (km)	MMI	Notes	Dead	Injured
8	Fiji, south of	6.8	494.1				
28	New Zealand, Kermadec Islands	6.5	25.0				

=== October ===
October
- Strongest: 7.5 M_{w} Taiwan
- Deadliest: 7.5 M_{w} Taiwan; 68 deaths
- Total fatalities: 68

Number by magnitude
- 8.0–8.9: 0
- 7.0–7.9: 3
- 6.0–6.9: 28

Date	Country and location	M_{w}	Depth (km)	MMI	Notes	Casualties	
Date	Country and location	M_{w}	Depth (km)	MMI	Notes	Dead	Injured
8	United States, off the coast of northern California	6.0	15.0	V			
11	Papua and New Guinea, East New Britain Province	6.3	35.0	VI			
15	Japan, south of Shikoku	6.1	20.5	V			
18	Japan, off the northeast coast of Honshu	6.4	65.0	V			
21	Taiwan, Hualien County	7.5	25.0	VII	This was the first in a swarm of powerful earthquakes that struck eastern Taiwan over the next few weeks. To prevent cluttering only magnitude 7.0+ events or ones that caused damage or deaths will be listed. All magnitude 6.0+ events have been plotted on the map and included in the statistics.		
22	Taiwan, Hualien County	7.2	25.0	VII	1951 East Rift Valley earthquakes.		
22	Taiwan, Hualien County	7.0	20.0	VII	1951 East Rift Valley earthquakes. This was the last of the magnitude 7.0+ events in the initial part of the swarm. A total of 68 people were killed across these events. 586 were injured. 2,382 homes were destroyed.	68	586
31	Indonesia, Batu Islands	6.5	50.0	VI			
31	Indonesia, Batu Islands	6.0	30.0	V	Aftershock.		

=== November ===
November
- Strongest: 7.8 M_{w} Taiwan
- Deadliest: 7.3 M_{w} Taiwan; 17 deaths
- Total fatalities: 17

Number by magnitude
- 8.0–8.9: 0
- 7.0–7.9: 4
- 6.0–6.9: 9

Date	Country and location	M_{w}	Depth (km)	MMI	Notes	Casualties	
Date	Country and location	M_{w}	Depth (km)	MMI	Notes	Dead	Injured
4	Philippines, off the east coast of Samar	6.3	25.0	VI			
6	Russian Soviet Federative Socialist Republic, Kuril Islands	7.0	35.0				
9	Chile, Antofagasta Region	6.8	123.0				
12	Russian Soviet Federative Socialist Republic, east of the Kuril Islands	6.5	20.0				
17	China, eastern Xizang Province	6.1	15.0	VII	Foreshock.		
18	China, eastern Xizang Province	6.8	15.0		Foreshock.		
18	China, eastern Xizang Province	7.7	30.0	VII	Some homes were destroyed.		
18	China, eastern Xizang Province	6.0	15.0	VII	Aftershock.		
22	Australia, East New Britain Province, Papua New Guinea	6.2	45.0	VI			
24	Taiwan, Taitung County	7.3	25.0	VII	Part of the 1951 East Rift Valley earthquakes. 17 people were killed and 250 were injured. Further damage was caused.	17	250
24	Taiwan, Taitung County	7.8	30.0	VII	Part of the 1951 East Rift Valley earthquakes. This came only 3 minutes after the previous event.		
29	Indonesia, Minahassa Peninsula, Sulawesi	6.5	121.9				

=== December ===
December
- Strongest: 7.5 M_{w} Southwest Indian Ridge
- Total fatalities: 0

Number by magnitude
- 8.0–8.9: 0
- 7.0–7.9: 1
- 6.0–6.9: 7

Date	Country and location	M_{w}	Depth (km)	MMI	Notes	Casualties	
Date	Country and location	M_{w}	Depth (km)	MMI	Notes	Dead	Injured
6	Colombia, off the coast of Choco Department	6.1	15.0	VI			
8	Southwest Indian Ridge	7.5	15.0				
12	Mexico, Oaxaca	6.8	86.8				
21	China, Yunnan Province	6.4	27.5	IX	Major destruction was caused in the area. 29,890 homes were destroyed.		
26	China, eastern Xizang Province	6.3	15.0	VII			
26	China, Gansu Province	6.2	15.0	VII			
28	Mexico, Guerrero	6.5	30.7	VI			
