= 1575 San Salvador earthquake =

1575 earthquake in Central America

- Location within Central America
- Local date: 23 May 1575
- Epicenter: Between San Marcos and Santo Tomás; 13.586°N 89.217°W
- Type: Telluric
- Areas affected: San Salvador
- Max. intensity: Unknown
- Casualties: 3 killed

On 23 May 1575, a telluric earthquake struck the city of San Salvador in the Spanish colony of New Spain. The earthquake destroyed the city. The earthquake was the second earthquake recorded with its epicenter in modern-day El Salvador, after the 1524 San Salvador earthquake.

== Earthquake ==
On 23 May 1575, the day after the Christian holiday of Pentecost, an telluric earthquake struck the city of San Salvador. The epicenter of the earthquake was somewhere between San Marcos and Santo Tomás, two municipalities located just south of San Salvador.

The intensity of the earthquake is unknown, but it destroyed the city of San Salvador; almost all of the city's buildings were destroyed, including its oldest church. On 18 November 1576, Spanish king Philip II issued a royal decree in Madrid providing aid to the city. The earthquake killed three people.

== See also ==
- List of earthquakes in El Salvador
