= 1951 El Salvador earthquake =

- Location within Central America
- UTC time: 1951-05-06 23:03:32
- ISC event: 894318
- USGS-ANSS: ComCat
- Local date: 6 May 1951
- Local time: 17:03 CST
- Magnitude: 5.9–6.2 M_{s}
- Depth: 96.0 km (60 mi) or upper crust depth
- Epicenter: 13.41°N 88.26°W
- Type: Strike-slip
- Areas affected: El Salvador
- Max. intensity: MMI VIII (Severe)
- Casualties: 400–1,100 dead, 4,000 injured

On 6 May 1951 El Salvador was struck by an earthquake with a magnitude of 5.9–6.2 M_{s} at 23:03 UTC (17:03 local time). This was the first in a sequence that affected the area around Jucuapa over a period of a few days. The maximum felt intensity was VIII (Severe) on the Modified Mercalli Intensity Scale and it led to between 400 and 1,100 deaths.

== Tectonic setting ==
Jucuapa lies within the Valle de la Esperanza, a valley to the north of a line of active volcanoes, including the Usulatán, San Vicente and San Miguel volcanoes. These are a result of the subduction of the Cocos plate beneath the Caribbean plate along the Middle America Trench.

Earthquakes are associated with rupturing along the plate interface, such as the 1992 Nicaragua earthquake, faulting within the downgoing Cocos plate, such as the January 2001 El Salvador earthquake and faulting within the overriding Caribbean plate, such as the February 2001 El Salvador earthquake.

== Earthquake sequence ==
The sequence began at about 17:03 local time with a shock measuring an estimated 5.9–6.2 M_{s}. Focal depths of about 100 km have been reported for this earthquake, although macroseismic observations suggest a much shallower focus, consistent with the detection of surface waves. The focal mechanism suggest strike-slip faulting on either a NNW–SSE trending left lateral fault or a WSW–ENE trending right lateral fault. The first earthquake was felt as an intense vertical jolt. It was followed about four and a half minutes later by the second earthquake, measuring an estimated 6.0–6.2 M_{s}. The second event was felt as a violent horizontal shock. The following day, at about 14:22 local time, a third earthquake struck with an estimated magnitude of 5.5 M_{s}.

The distribution of intensities, particularly the small areas of the highest intensities, are indicative of a very shallow seismic source (upper crust).

== Damage ==
The first earthquake in the sequence, although strongly felt in Jucuapa and the neighbouring towns and villages of Chinameca, San Buenaventura and Nueva Guadalupe, caused little damage and no casualties. The second event, however, caused the almost complete destruction of Jucuapa, with only one badly damaged building left standing. In Chinameca most buildings were destroyed or severely damaged. Two buildings remained apparently unaffected, one of reinforced concrete and the other of a traditional construction that involves metal sheets on a wooden frame. 90% of the adobe houses and three churches collapsed in San Buenaventura. Only 10–20 of the 320 houses in Nueva Guadelupe were usable after the earthquake.

350 deaths were reported from Jucuapa with a further 50 from Chinameca and 3 in San Buenaventura (the low number there being attributed to most people watching a football match). Other sources give a total of 1,100 fatalities and up to a further 4,000 injured.

== See also ==
- List of earthquakes in 1951
- List of earthquakes in El Salvador
