= 1986 San Salvador earthquake =

1986 earthquake in Central America

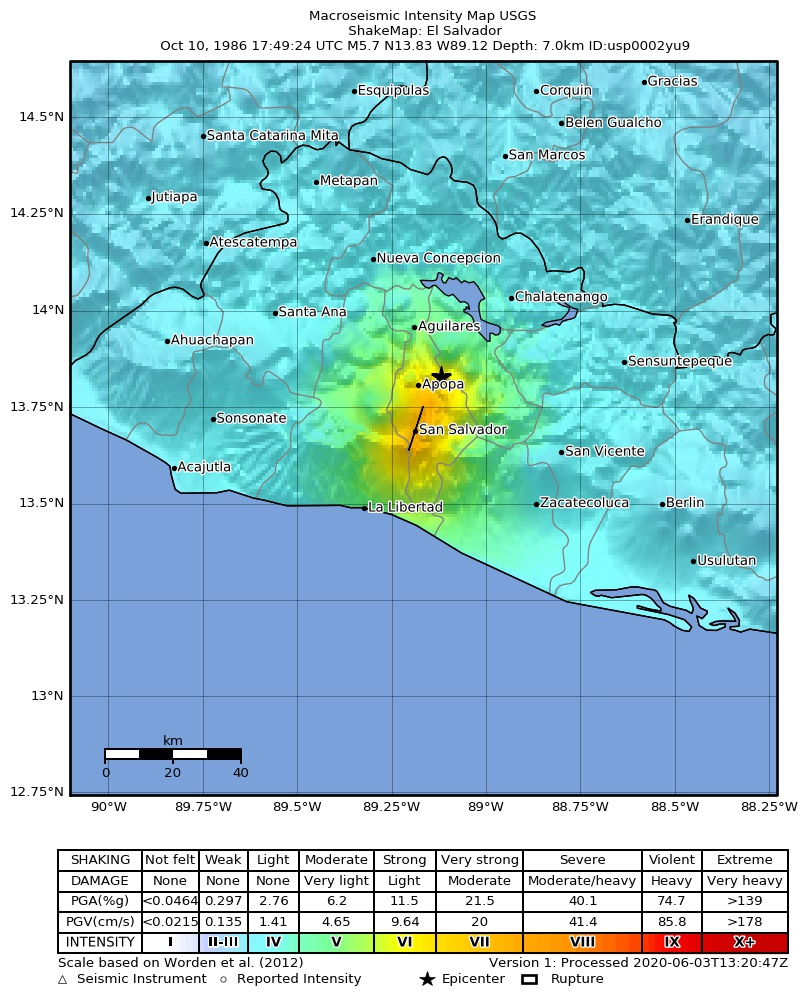

- Location within Central America
- UTC time: 1986-10-10 17:49:26
- ISC event: 483349
- USGS-ANSS: ComCat
- Local date: 10 October 1986
- Local time: 11:49:26
- Magnitude: 5.7 M_{w}
- Depth: 10 km (6.2 mi)
- Epicenter: 13.75°N 89.24°W
- Type: Strike-slip
- Areas affected: El Salvador; Honduras; Guatemala
- Max. intensity: MMI IX (Violent)
- Casualties: 1,000–1,500 dead 10,000–20,000 injured

The 1986 San Salvador earthquake occurred at 11:49:26 local time on 10 October 1986 with a moment magnitude of 5.7 and a maximum Mercalli intensity of IX (Violent). The shock caused considerable damage to El Salvador's capital city of San Salvador and surrounding areas, including neighboring Honduras and Guatemala.

== Earthquake ==
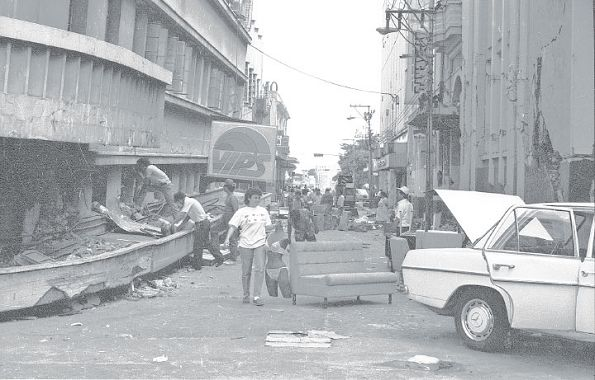
Damage caused by the earthquake

The 1986 San Salvador earthquake occurred within the upper crust of the Caribbean plate along the Central America Volcanic Arc. It was a result of left-lateral strike slip faulting perpendicular to the Central American volcanic chain. The earthquake also caused landslides in the San Salvador area.

== Damage and response ==
The earthquake caused between 1,000 and 1,500 deaths, 10,000 injuries, and left 200,000 homeless. Shallow shocks directly under San Salvador caused the destruction of multiple structures. San Salvador's children's hospital, a marketplace, many restaurants and buildings, and shanty towns were significantly damaged or destroyed. In response, President José Napoleón Duarte established the Earthquake Reconstruction Committee, tasking it with not only rebuilding the city, but modernizing it; to this end Jesús Permuy, an urban planner and architect, was chosen to be leader. Following the conclusion of the committee's work, he remained in the country for another year, teaching officials about contemporary urban planning.

== See also ==
- List of earthquakes in El Salvador
- 1965 San Salvador earthquake
