= 1965 Oaxaca earthquake =

Earthquake in Mexico

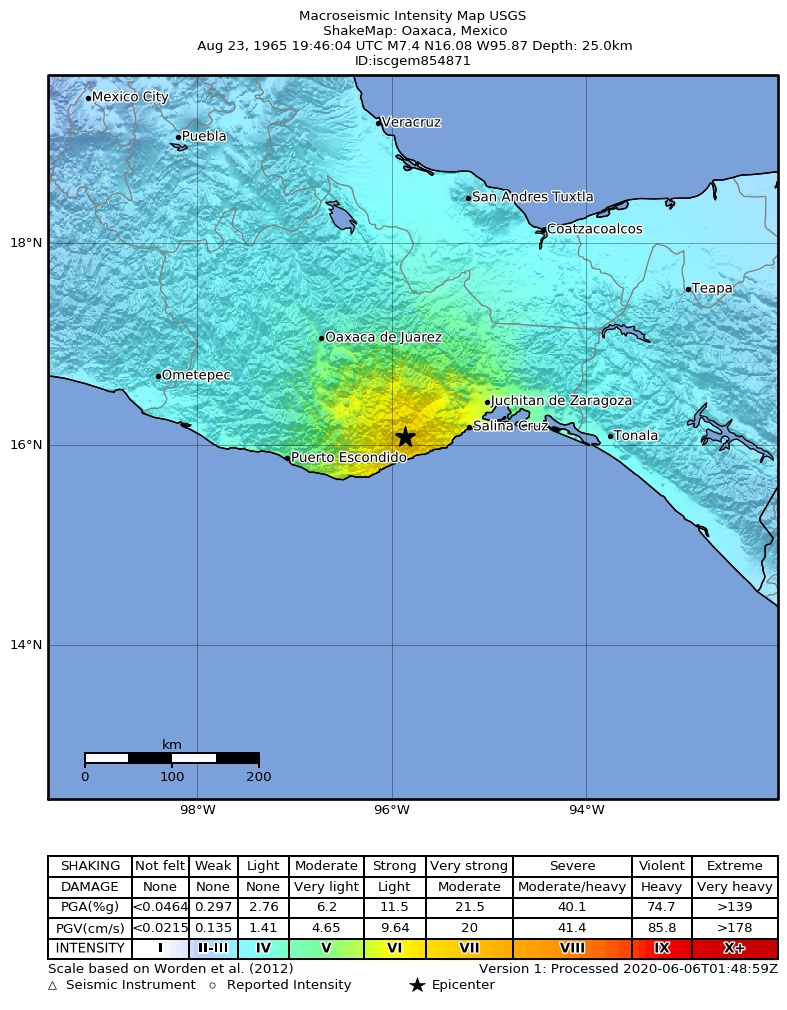
- USGS ShakeMap

- Location within Mexico
- UTC time: 1965-08-23 19:46:04
- ISC event: 854871
- USGS-ANSS: ComCat
- Local date: 23 August 1965
- Local time: 13:46:04
- Magnitude: M_{w} 7.5
- Depth: 12 km (7.5 mi)
- Epicenter: 15.38°N 96.12°W
- Casualties: 6 dead

The 1965 Oaxaca earthquake occurred in Mexico on August 23 at 13:46 with a moment magnitude of 7.5. Five people were reported dead in Mexico City and one in Oaxaca. There was an anomalous change in seismic activities before the earthquake. There was a quiescent stage from late 1963 to mid-1964, and it was followed by a renewal of seismic activities before the main shock. This earthquake was a shallow thrust earthquake in the interplate subduction zone, in which the Cocos plate is subducting beneath the North American plate.

== See also ==
- List of earthquakes in 1965
- List of earthquakes in Mexico
