= 1625 El Salvador earthquake =

Coordinates: 13.697°N 89.198°W

The 1625 El Salvador earthquake was described as a "violent earthquake that caused serious damage", it affected the city of San Salvador, and left it in ruins. Surrounding pueblos were also affected.
