= Geology of El Salvador =

The geology of El Salvador is underlain by rocks dating to the Paleozoic. Prior to the Pennsylvanian, sediments deposited and were intensely deformed, intruded by granite rocks and metamorphosed. Northern Central America took shape during uplift in the Triassic, large than its current area and extending east to the Nicaragua Rise. The Cayman Ridge and Bartlet Trough formed from longitudinal faults at the crest of the uplift. Deformation in the Cretaceous brought granite intrusions, particularly in what is now Nicaragua. Much of the terrain and coastline of the country is defined by volcanoes and volcanic deposits produced from the subduction of the Cocos Plate.

On the surface, rocks in El Salvador primarily date to the Pliocene and early Pleistocene and are typically volcanic. Some of the oldest surface exposures are in the Metapan area, with pre-Mesozoic monzonite together with Cretaceous marine limestone, overlain by Paleogene volcanic and terrestrial sedimentary rocks. The 650 foot thick Paleogene sandstone and conglomerate are above an unconformity with 30 feet of gray andesite, 400 feet of limestone and additional sandstone, conglomerate and calcareous shale. El Salvador has extensive large vertebrate fossils from the Cenozoic, including mammoth, mastodon, megatherium, toxodont, bison, ground sloth and camelid remains.

In the vicinity of the eroded plain of San Salvador, rocks exposed at the surface range in age from the Miocene to the Holocene, and include nearly 100 meters of alluvium, pyroclastic material, basalt and andesite in the San Salvador Formation. This formation is underlain by the acid volcanic rocks of the Cuscatlan Formation and the andesite-basalt lavas of the Balsamo Formation.
