= Chihshang fault =

Fault system in Taiwan

Map of the East Rift Valley, Taiwan. With the green area illustrating the East Rift Valley. Sited on the south-east coast of Taiwan between the Central Mountain Range and the Hai’an Range.

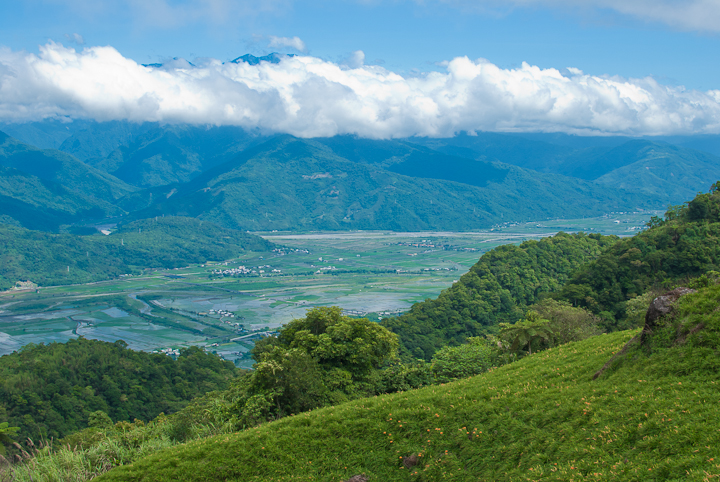
The actual vision of East Rift Valley with a view from Mount Liushishi.

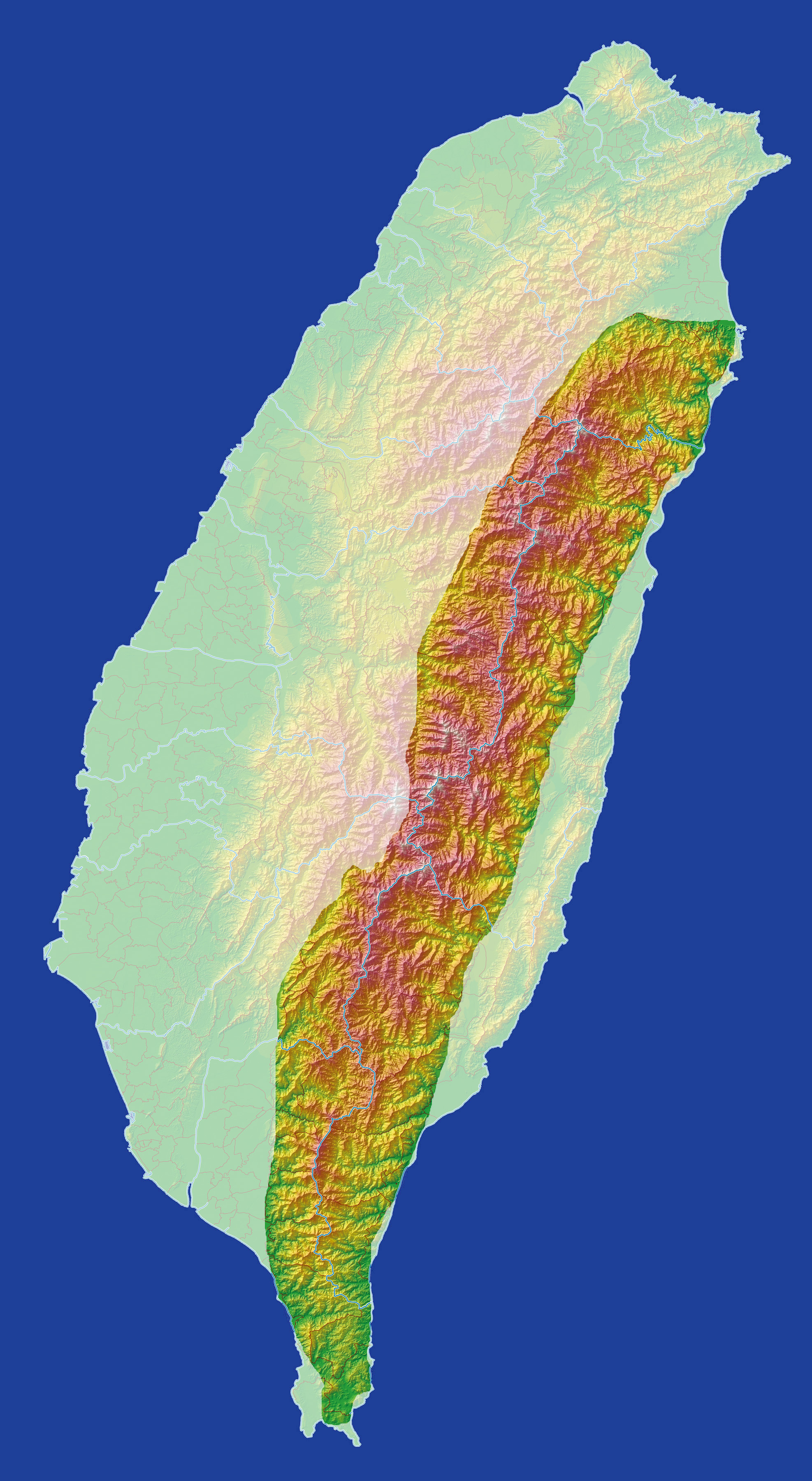
The Central Mountain Range in Taiwan

The Chihshang fault (Chinese: 池上段層) is an active reverse fault system located in the center of the Longitudinal Valley (the East Rift Valley in the eastern part of Taiwan), and is a segment of the Longitudinal Valley Fault. The fault strikes north-northeast–south-southwest, situated between the Central Mountain Range and the Hai'an Range. It lies within the active major collision zone between the Philippine Sea and Eurasian plates. The Chihshang fault extends for about 35 km, from Yuli in the north to Kuanshan in the south. The Chihshang fault remains active. It is thought to be actively creeping as has continuously created cracks and fractures in walls and buildings. The Chihshang fault has a high slip rate of about 2–3 cm/year, and a 4 cm/year creep rate at the dip-slip direction approximately.

== East Rift Valley ==
East Rift Valley is one of the national scenic areas of Taiwan, it is a 150 km long rift valley. This area is rich in cultural and natural value. It is an important tourist spot in East Taiwan. It has mountains, forest, wetland, trail, river, farmland, pasture, etc. Is one of the important agricultural production areas in Taiwan. The natural landscape favors agricultural industries a lot. An indentation low lying rift valley with two high mountain range aside, allows sediments and nutrients flow in with water from rain or streams. Which creates a thick alluvial soil, favors crops growing.

== Formation ==
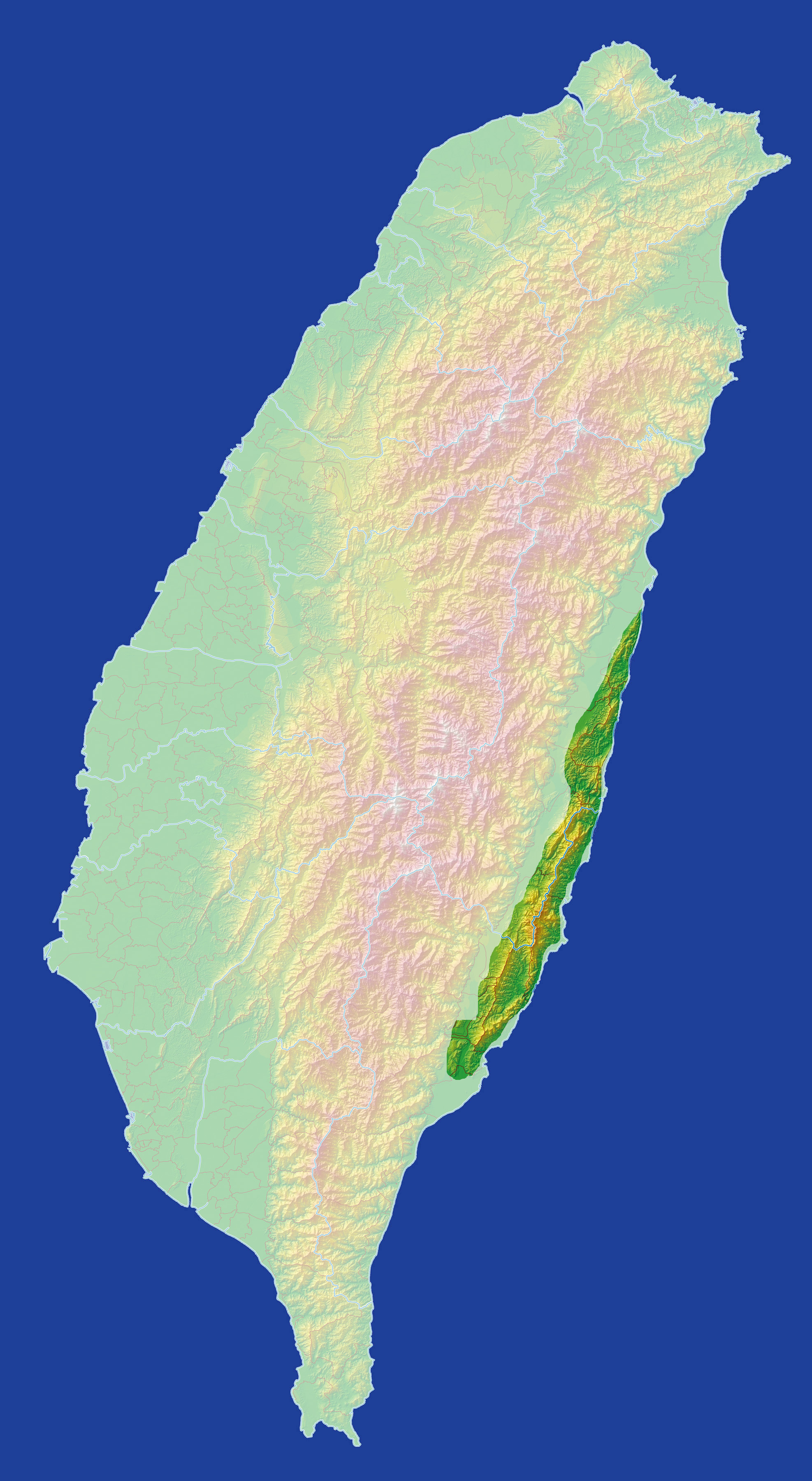
The Hai'an Range in the east coast of Taiwan

The collision of the Philippine Sea Plate and Eurasian plate can be observed on land between Central Mountain Range and Hai’an Rang. Philippine Plate moves in northwest direction with a speed of 8.2 cm/year. Under accumulating increasing force, rocks break and displace in the structure of fault.

=== Geology ===
The formation of the Hai’an Range did not take place in Taiwan, it occurred in the northern Luzon arc instead. It is mainly composed of calc-alkaline volcanic formations. In late Miocene age where sea level is high, flysch-like Plio-Quaternary sediments deposited forming layered sedimentary rocks. Due to the compressional force generated by plate movements, the Hai’an Range rock layers experience folding, thrusting and uplift.

The East Rift Valley is formed from a group of Quanternary continental deposits.

Regarding the active Chihshang Fault, unit of Pliocene Lichi Mélange sits at the east of Chihshang Fault while the Pleistocene-Holocene at the west. Chihshang Fault lies more to the west in general, but it still cuts the terraces that lie on the Lichi Mélange. The terraces form both the flat, low-lying East Rift Valley and the bumpy Hai’an fold mountain.

The Lichi Mélange between the Hai’an Range and the East Rift Valley is being a mean of separation. It is a group of marine clays from the Pliocene age in the form of rock blocks. The unit includes ophiolitic rocks and Miocene sandstones. Significant folding, shearing, thrusting of both east and west thrusting were processed on the Lichi Mélange too.

=== Fault creep ===
Faulting activities can take place with different results. For example, resulting in a major earthquake or non-detectable minor earthquakes. Fault creep is a gradual movement of two sections of rock. Creep rate is related to the earthquake. Creep rate of a fault is usually low before an earthquake, while during or after an earthquake always results in high creep rate. Fault creep results in creaks on concrete walls, water drainage system and others, which created clear faulting trace that people can easily observe. Fault creep activities had been continuously tracing as it clearly proves the tectonic activities. Along the fault, researchers found clear evidence of active creeping activities. Ruptures and surface breaks are some of the evidence of fault creep.

=== Deformation ===
Deformation as a result of tectonic movement, under faulting usually results in the breakage of the rock or fractures. The East Rift Valley is shortening at an average velocity of 2.1 cm per year.

=== Dip angle ===
Chihshang Fault has a SE-dipping direction, the fault zone extends from near the surface to 25-kilometer depth proximately. At the middle section of the fault, the dip angle is 42° between depth of 10 to 20 kilometer. The dip angle of Chihshang Fault are different at a different section of the fault, the angle increases to 72° and then decrease to 20° along the fault.

== Tectonic activities at Chihshang Fault ==
=== 1951 East Rift Valley earthquakes ===
In 1950, there was a series of strong earthquake occurred along the East Rift Valley. The first three was the largest scale, magnitude greater than 7, and they took place at the northern tip of the valley which is where the city Hualien was located. The 1951 'East Rift Valley earthquakes' was recorded. This is a historical earthquake in Hualien that made people pay greater attention to the tectonic activities here. For the later 20 years, there is no large scale earthquake but the fault development was still continued with some minor quake.

=== 2003 Chengkung earthquake ===
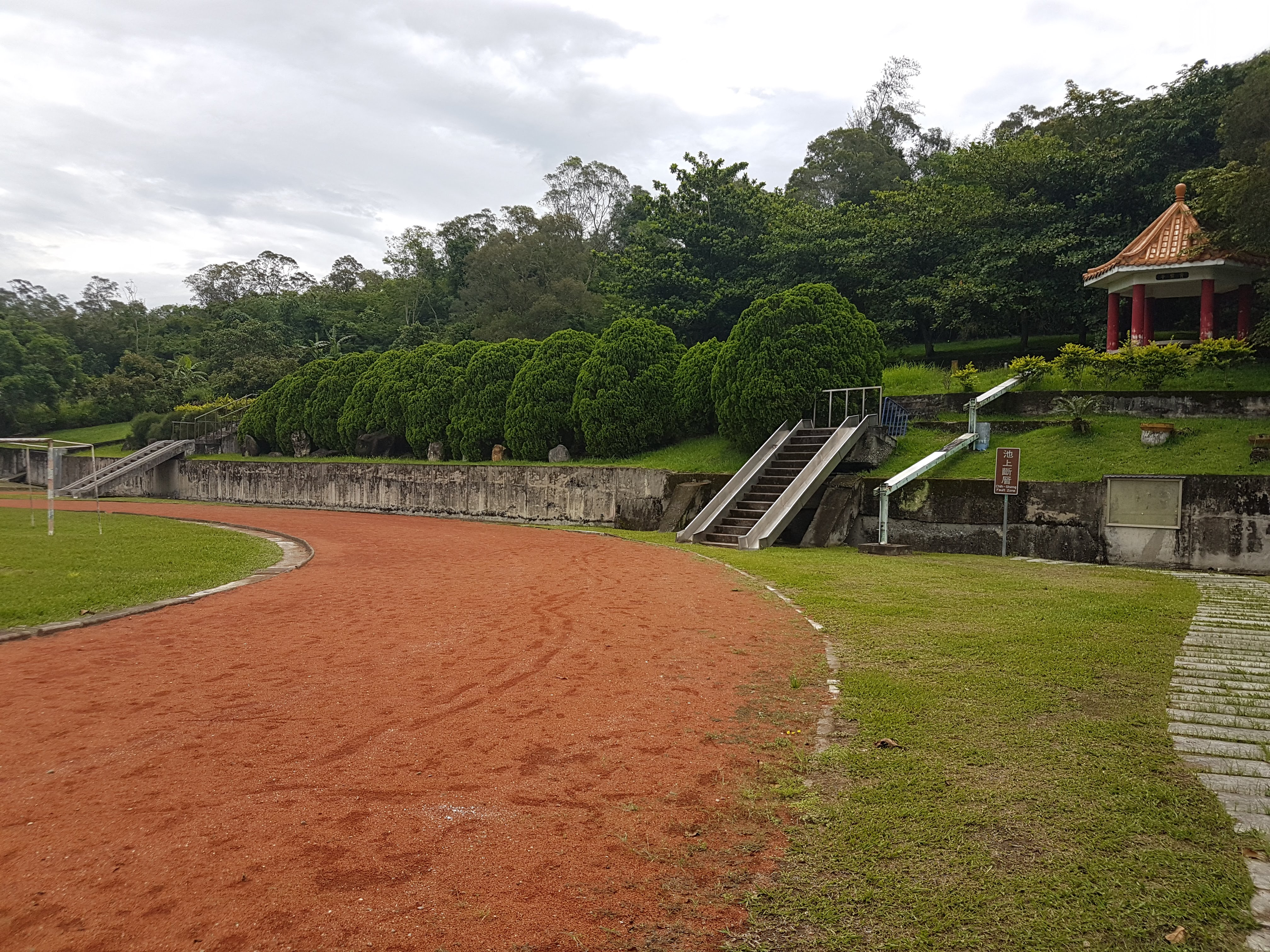
Opened playground of Tapo Primary School

The 2003 Chengkung earthquake occurred on 10 December. During the earthquake, deformation also took place on the fault. The aftershocks created a fault-vend which is 18 km deep. It had a moment magnitude of 6.8. It triggered landslides, rock falls and damaged infrastructures in the area. At least one person was injured and it triggered a fire in Kao-hsiung.

== Fault trace ==
=== Tapo Primary School ===
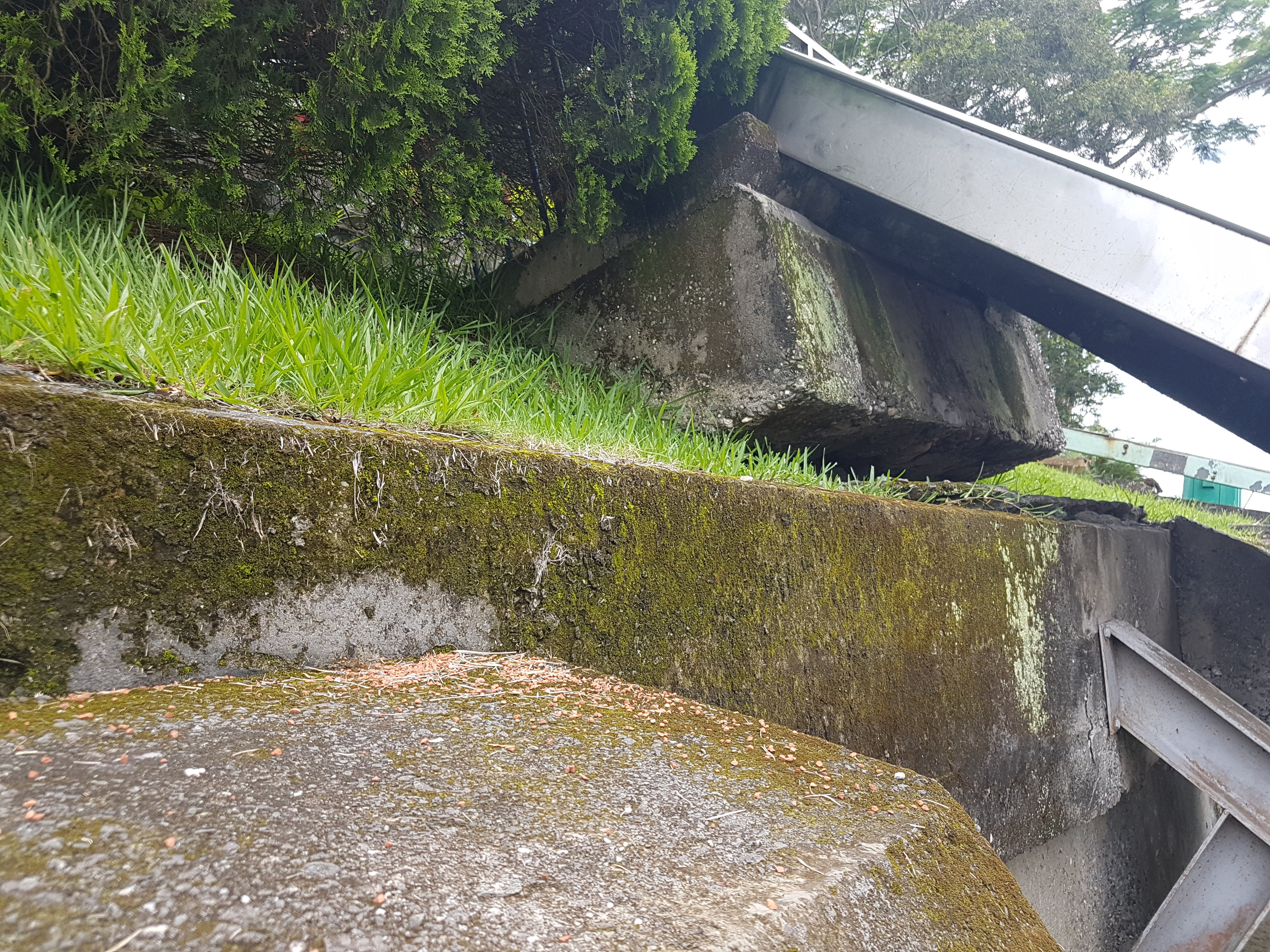
Playground in Tapo Primary School titled due to the force generated by faulting

At the opened field ground of Tapo Primary school, clear traces of the Chihshang fault can be clearly observed at the surface. A playground slide was titled due to the compressional force generated during faulting. Creaks appeared on concrete walls. Part of the back side of the field ground was removed which displacement of rock layers was exposed and observed.

=== Others ===
Creaks on roads, infrastructures, buildings, and walls have appeared all along the East Rift Valley fault zone.

== Research and findings ==
=== Professor Jacques Angelier ===
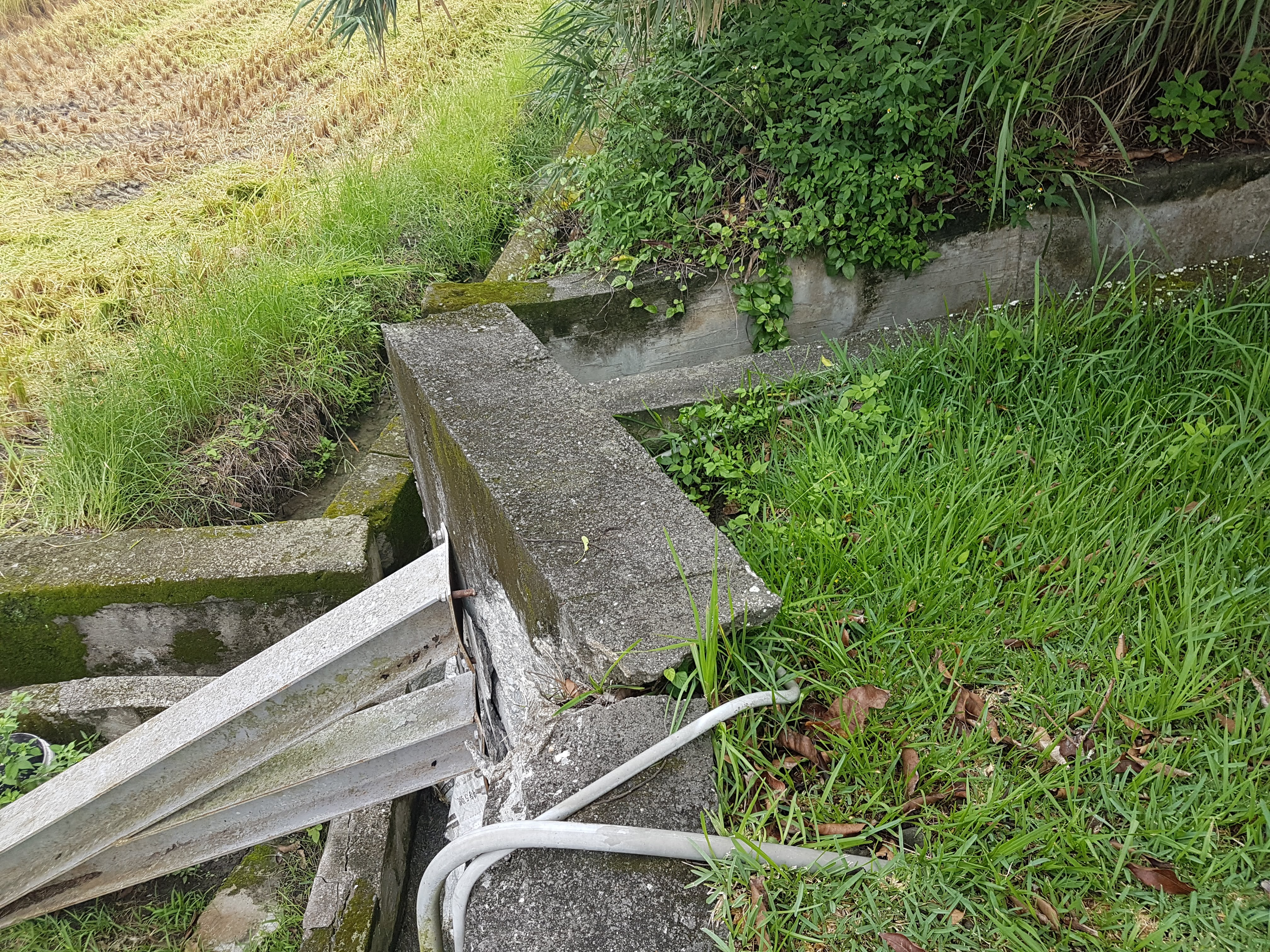
Concrete drainage system broke by faulting in Chishang

Prof. Jacques Angelier was a famous French geologist, particularly known for his contributions to paleostress research. He is an important person who has a great contribution to the investigation of Chihshang Fault. 1981 Prof. Angelier first visit Taiwan to have field research in the tectonics of Taiwan at the eastern site. During the 30 years' journey, Prof. Angelier continuously visits Taiwan every year for the research of Chihshang fault and the related tectonic movement in the East Rift Valley. Prof. Angelier has his last work in Taiwan in 2009, then he died next year on 31 January, at the age of 62.

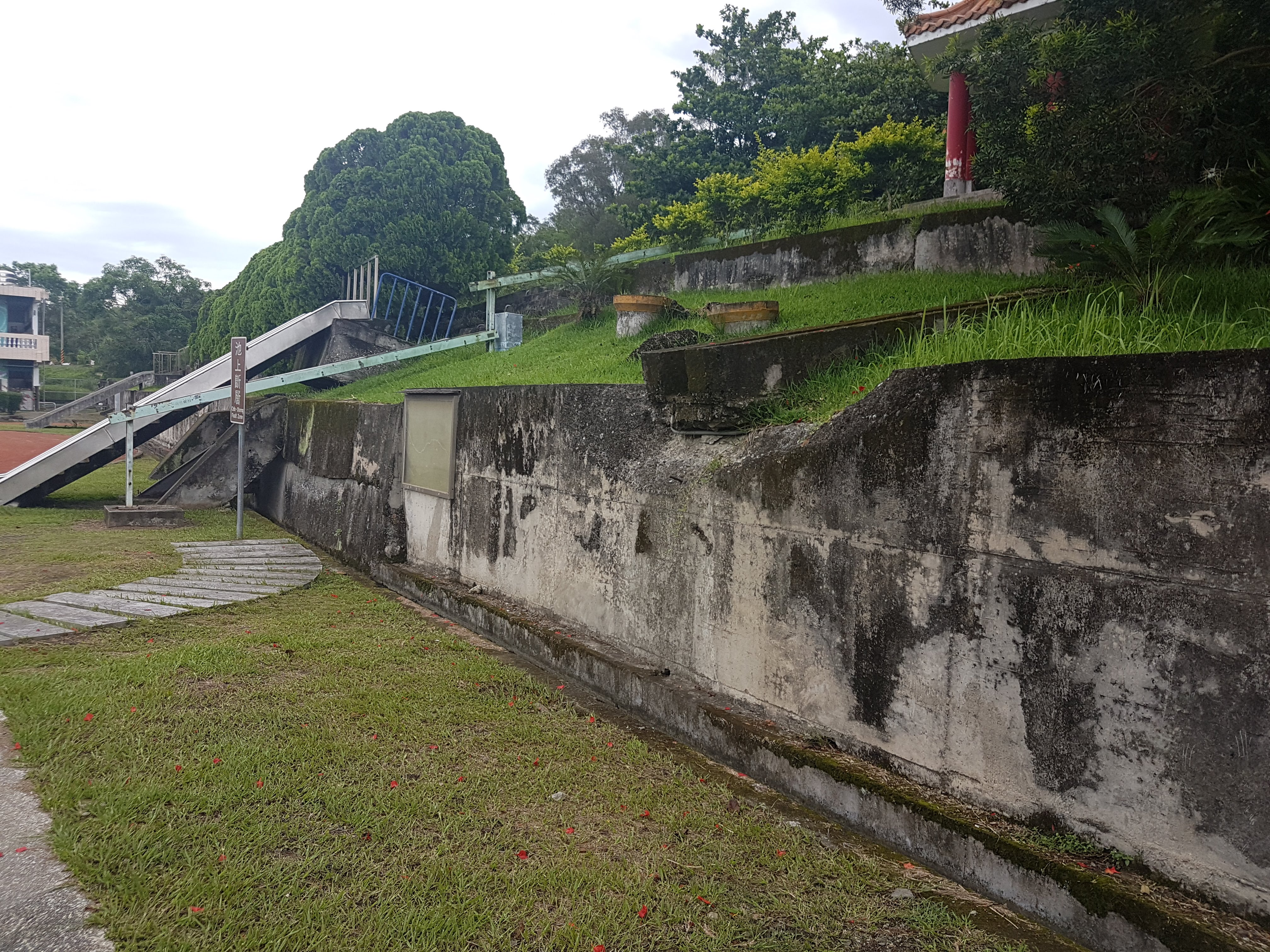
Rod-type creep meter next to the slide in Tapo Primary School.

=== Rod-type creepmeter ===
Rod-type creepmeter is used to measure the displacement of two sections of the block at a fault. During fault creep and rock displace, the distance of two ends of rod-type creepmeter also change associatively, resulting in different data output. Two aligned creepmeters were placed across the fault behind the slide in the opened field ground of Tapo Primary school. One end is at the top of the slide, the other end is at the end of the slide. Three others were installed at the fault zone in the Chinyuan village. Creepmeter patterns indicate both temporal and spatial fault creep pattern of Chihshang Fault. Since 1998, creep meter data is collected daily. The temporal pattern was found that faster fault motion during wet seasons and dormancy during dry seasons. Thus, the rainfall pattern is an important factor which significantly affects fault creep movements. A rod-type creepmeter is rather low-cost and easy to construct and illustrate. They are also accessible and easy to maintain as they are located on the ground surface.

=== Ground penetrating radar and seismic reflection ===
Through collecting ground penetrating radar, researchers are able to establish the three-dimensional fault pattern of the Chihshang Fault. Details, such as variation of dip angle, can also be determined. Ground penetrating radar is a good method for tracking the temporal change for the structure of the fault. But the ground penetrating radar cable can only image to a depth of 5 meters, seismic reflection lines are frequently used to obtain more data from deeper area. High resolution seismic reflection technology of the type used can penetrate up to a depth of 60 - 300 meter. The practice of using ground penetrating radar to study faulting began in the mid-1980s.

=== Survey of soil-gas variation ===
A survey of soil-gas variation is to test the gas composition of the soil. Results can reflect the geological, geophysical and topographical characteristics of a place. Automatic soil radon monitoring stations were set up at fault zones where rod-type creep meter already exists. So the results of soil-gas radon can be compared with data of rod-type creep meter. Unusually high soil radon concentration is usually observed a few days before the earthquake, but some exceptionally high soil radon can also be related to fault creep activities. Heavy rainfall is an important factor that will cause soil radon to increase.

=== Other methods ===
==== GPS measurements ====
By reading into GPS data, speed of the two converging plates can be accessed. GPS data is also used to understand the crustal motion faults.

==== Groundwater pressure measure ====
Groundwater variations are measured by wells as the groundwater level varies over time.

=== Constraints of research ===
==== Climate ====
Taiwan is located in a tropical climate zone, results in humid tropical climate conditions. Frequency rainfall causes quick erosion of rocks and changes the land surface like vegetation cover and agriculture land. It destroys some of the fault traces.

==== Extensive human activity ====
Chishang is a community majoring in farming activity, there is a lot of farmland and crop yield. Further, schools, houses, and temples are located formed the community of the village. While a lot of fault trace can be found in site own by villagers or under buildings, the source of investigation is restricted and reduced.

== Other related faults ==
- Central Range Fault
- Coastal Range Fault
