= List of costliest earthquakes =

This is a list of major earthquakes by the dollar value of property (public and private) losses directly attributable to the earthquake. Only earthquakes that have caused damage over US$1 billion, adjusted for inflation, are listed here. Wherever possible, indirect and socioeconomic losses are excluded. Damage estimates for particular earthquakes may vary over time as more data becomes available. Losses from earthquake–induced landslides and tsunamis are also be included.

== Over $1 billion ==
Event	Location	Magnitude	Historic cost (year)	Adjusted for inflation (year)
2011 Tōhoku earthquake and tsunami	(Japan) Japan	9.0–9.1	$360 billion (2011)	$515.2 billion (2025)
1995 Hanshin earthquake	(Japan) Japan	6.9	$200 billion (1995)	$422.6 billion (2025)
2008 Sichuan earthquake	(China) China	7.9–8.3	$130 billion (2008)	$194.4 billion (2025)
2023 Turkey–Syria earthquakes	(Turkey) Turkey (Ba'athist Syria) Syria	7.8 & 7.7	$163.3 billion (2023)	$172.6 billion (2025)
1994 Northridge earthquake	(United States) United States (California)	6.7	$40 billion (1994)	$86.9 billion (2025)
1980 Irpinia earthquake	(Italy) Italy	6.9	$20 billion (1980)	$78.2 billion (2025)
2004 Chūetsu earthquake	(Japan) Japan	6.6	$40 billion (2004)	$68.2 billion (2025)
1976 Tangshan earthquake	(China) China	7.6	$10 billion (1976)	$56.6 billion (2025)
1988 Armenian earthquake	(Armenia) Armenia	6.8	$16.2 billion (1988)	$44.1 billion (2025)
2010 Canterbury & February 2011 Christchurch earthquakes	(New Zealand) New Zealand	7.0 & 6.1–6.2	$27.9 billion (2015)	$37.9 billion (2025)
2026 Venezuela earthquakes	(Venezuela) Venezuela	7.2 & 7.5	$37 billion (2026)	$37 billion (2026)
2016 Kumamoto earthquakes	(Japan) Japan	7.0	$24–46 billion (2016)	$32.2–61.7 billion (2025)
2011 Sikkim earthquake	(India) India	6.9	$22.3 billion (2011)	$31.9 billion (2025)
2004 Indian Ocean earthquake and tsunami	(Indonesia) Indonesia	9.2–9.3	$15 billion (2004)	$25.6 billion (2025)
2009 L'Aquila earthquake	(Italy) Italy	6.3	$16 billion (2009)	$24.0 billion (2025)
1972 Nicaragua earthquake	(Nicaragua) Nicaragua	6.3	$2.9 billion (1972)	$22.3 billion (2025)
2012 Northern Italy earthquakes	(Italy) Italy	6.1	$15.8 billion (2012)	$22.2 billion (2025)
2010 Chile earthquake	(Chile) Chile	8.8	$15–30 billion (2010)	$22.1–40.2 billion (2025)
1939 Chillán earthquake	(Chile) Chile	8.3	$920 million (1939)	$21.3 billion (2025)
1976 Friuli earthquake	(Italy) Italy	6.5	$3.6 billion (1976)	$20.4 billion (2025)
1980 El Asnam earthquake	(Algeria) Algeria	7.3	$5.2 billion (1980)	$20.3 billion (2025)
2007 Chūetsu offshore earthquake	(Japan) Japan	6.6	$12.5 billion (2007)	$19.4 billion (2025)
1999 Jiji earthquake	(Taiwan) Taiwan	7.7	$10 billion (1999)	$19.3 billion (2025)
2001 Gujarat earthquake	(India) India	7.6	$10 billion (2001)	$18.2 billion (2025)
1985 Mexico City earthquake	(Mexico) Mexico	8.0	$5 billion (1985)	$15.0 billion (2025)
2020 Zagreb earthquake	(Croatia) Croatia	5.3	$11.7 billion (2020)	$14.6 billion (2025)
1989 Loma Prieta earthquake	(United States) United States (California)	6.9	$5.6–6 billion (1989)	$14.5–15.6 billion (2025)
1906 San Francisco earthquake	(United States) United States (California)	7.7–7.9	$400 million (1906)	$14.3 billion (2025)
2015 Nepal earthquake	(Nepal) Nepal	7.8–7.9	$10 billion (2015)	$13.6 billion (2025)
2014 Ludian earthquake	(China) China	6.1	$9.9 billion (2014)	$13.5 billion (2025)
1948 Fukui earthquake	(Japan) Japan	6.8	$1 billion (1948)	$13.4 billion (2025)
2026 Colombia earthquake	(Colombia) Colombia	7.4	$13.4 billion (2026)	$13.4 billion (2026)
1999 İzmit earthquake	(Turkey) Turkey	7.6	$6.5–20 billion (1999)	$12.6–26.8 billion (2025)
1979 Montenegro earthquake	(Montenegro) Montenegro	6.9	$2.7 billion (1979)	$12.0 billion (2025)
1976 Guatemala earthquake	(Guatemala) Guatemala	7.5	$2.1 billion (1976)	$11.9 billion (2025)
2010 Haiti earthquake	(Haiti) Haiti	7.0	$7.8–8.5 billion (2010)	$11.5–12.5 billion (2025)
1923 Great Kantō earthquake	(Japan) Japan	8.0	$600 million (1923)	$11.3 billion (2025)
2025 Myanmar earthquake	(Myanmar) Myanmar (Thailand) Thailand	7.7–7.9	$11 billion (2025)	$11.0 billion (2025)
1977 Vrancea earthquake	(Romania) Romania	7.5	$2.1 billion (1977)	$11.2 billion (2025)
2005 Kashmir earthquake	(Pakistan) Pakistan (India) India	7.6	$6.6 billion (2005)	$10.9 billion (2025)
1960 Valdivia earthquake	(Chile) Chile	9.4–9.6	$1 billion (1960)	$10.9 billion (2025)
2017 Puebla earthquake	(Mexico) Mexico	7.1	$8 billion (2017)	$10.5 billion (2025)
1963 Skopje earthquake	(North Macedonia) North Macedonia	6.0	$1 billion (1963)	$10.5 billion (2025)
2022 Fukushima earthquake	(Japan) Japan	7.3	$8.8 billion (2022)	$9.7 billion (2025)
2013 Lushan earthquake	(China) China	6.6	$6.8 billion (2013)	$9.4 billion (2025)
2021 Fukushima earthquake	(Japan) Japan	7.1	$7.7 billion (2021)	$9.1 billion (2025)
2018 Osaka earthquake	(Japan) Japan	5.5	$7 billion (2018)	$9.0 billion (2025)
2003 Boumerdès earthquake	(Algeria) Algeria	6.8	$5 billion (2003)	$8.8 billion (2025)
1999 Athens earthquake	(Greece) Greece	6.0	$4.2 billion (1999)	$8.1 billion (2025)
2017 Iran-Iraq earthquake	(Iran) Iran (Iraq) Iraq	7.4	$6.2 billion (2017)	$8.1 billion (2025)
2026 Kumamoto earthquake	(Japan) Japan	6.8	$7.6 billion (2026)	$7.6 billion (2025)
2023 Marrakesh–Safi earthquake	(Morocco) Morocco	6.9	$7 billion (2023)	$7.4 billion (2025)
2024 Noto earthquake	(Japan) Japan	7.5	$6.9–17.6 billion (2024)	$7.1–23.6 billion (2025)
1989 Newcastle earthquake	(Australia) Australia	5.4–5.6	$2.6 billion (1989)	$6.8 billion (2025)
2019 Ridgecrest earthquakes	(United States) United States (California)	7.1	$5.3 billion (2019)	$6.7 billion (2025)
2016 Central Italy earthquake	(Italy) Italy	6.2	$5 billion (2016)	$6.7 billion (2025)
1982 North Yemen earthquake	(Yemen) Yemen	6.3	$2 billion (1982)	$6.7 billion (2025)
2020 Petrinja earthquake	(Croatia) Croatia	6.4	$5 billion (2020)	$6.2 billion (2025)
1953 Concepción earthquake	(Chile) Chile	7.6	$500 million (1953)	$6.0 billion (2025)
2017 Chiapas earthquake	(Mexico) Mexico	8.2	$4 billion (2017)	$5.3 billion (2025)
2006 Yogyakarta earthquake	(Indonesia) Indonesia	6.3	$3.1 billion (2006)	$5.0 billion (2025)
1985 Algarrobo earthquake	(Chile) Chile	8.0	$1.5 billion (1985)	$4.5 billion (2025)
2016 Ecuador earthquake	(Ecuador) Ecuador	7.8	$3.3 billion (2016)	$4.4 billion (2025)
1970 Ancash earthquake	(Peru) Peru	7.9	$530 million (1970)	$4.4 billion (2025)
2011 (June) Christchurch earthquake	(New Zealand) New Zealand	6.0	$3 billion (2011)	$4.3 billion (2025)
1978 Miyagi earthquake	(Japan) Japan	7.7	$865 million (1978)	$4.3 billion (2025)
1971 San Fernando earthquake	(United States) United States (California)	6.6	$530 million (1971)	$4.2 billion (2025)
1964 Alaska earthquake	(United States) United States (Alaska)	9.2	$400 million (1964)	$4.2 billion (2025)
2001 Nisqually earthquake	(United States) United States (Washington)	6.8	$2 billion (2001)	$3.6 billion (2025)
1981 Sirch earthquake	(Iran) Iran	7.1	$1 billion (1981)	$3.5 billion (2025)
1992 Erzincan earthquake	(Turkey) Turkey	6.7	$1.5 billion (1992)	$3.4 billion (2025)
2003 Tokachi earthquake	(Japan) Japan	8.3	$1.9 billion (2003)	$3.3 billion (2025)
2009 Sumatra earthquakes	(Indonesia) Indonesia	7.6	$2.2 billion (2009)	$3.3 billion (2025)
1968 Belice earthquake	(Italy) Italy	6.1	$320 million (1968)	$3.0 billion (2025)
1966 Tashkent earthquake	(Uzbekistan) Uzbekistan	5.2	$300 million (1966)	$3.0 billion (2025)
1981 Gulf of Corinth earthquakes	(Greece) Greece	6.7	$812 million (1981)	$2.9 billion (2025)
1987 Ecuador earthquakes	(Ecuador) Ecuador	7.1	$1 billion (1987)	$2.8 billion (2025)
2018 Hokkaido Eastern Iburi earthquake	(Japan) Japan	6.6	$2 billion (2018)	$2.6 billion (2025)
1983 Sea of Japan earthquake	(Japan) Japan	7.8	$800 million (1983)	$2.6 billion (2025)
2022 Luding earthquake	(China) China	6.7	$2.2 billion (2022)	$2.4 billion (2025)
1972 Ancona earthquake	(Italy) Italy	4.9	$300 million (1972)	$2.3 billion (2025)
2018 Sulawesi earthquake and tsunami	(Indonesia) Indonesia	7.5–7.6	$1.7 billion (2018)	$2.2 billion (2025)
2023 Jishishan earthquake	(China) China	5.9	$2 billion (2023)	$2.1 billion (2025)
2011 Van earthquakes	(Turkey) Turkey	7.1	$1.5 billion (2011)	$2.1 billion (2025)
1986 Vrancea earthquake	(Romania) Romania	7.2	$730 million (1986)	$2.1 billion (2025)
1998 Adana–Ceyhan earthquake	(Turkey) Turkey	6.3	$1 billion (1998)	$2.0 billion (2025)
1915 Avezzano earthquake	(Italy) Italy	6.7	$60 million (1915)	$1.9 billion (2025)
1971 Aconcagua earthquake	(Chile) Chile	7.8	$236 million (1971)	$1.9 billion (2025)
1944 San Juan earthquake	(Argentina) Argentina	6.9	$100 million (1944)	$1.8 billion (2025)
2021 Haiti earthquake	(Haiti) Haiti	7.2	$1.5 billion (2021)	$1.8 billion (2025)
2016 Kaikōura earthquake	(New Zealand) New Zealand	7.8	$1.3 billion (2016)	$1.7 billion (2025)
2019 Sichuan earthquake	(China) China	5.8	$1.3 billion (2019)	$1.6 billion (2025)
2010 Baja California earthquake	(Mexico) Mexico	7.2	$1.1 billion (2010)	$1.6 billion (2025)
2010 Kaohsiung earthquake	(Taiwan) Taiwan	6.3	$1 billion (2010)	$1.5 billion (2025)
2026 Mindanao earthquake	(Philippines) Philippines	7.8	$1.4 billion (2026)	$1.4 billion (2026)
2012 Yiliang earthquakes	(China) China	5.5	$1 billion (2012)	$1.4 billion (2025)
1967 Caracas earthquake	(Venezuela) Venezuela	6.6	$140 million (1967)	$1.4 billion (2025)
1983 Popayán earthquake	(Colombia) Colombia	5.5	$410 million (1983)	$1.3 billion (2025)
1965 Valparaíso earthquake	(Chile) Chile	7.4	$125 million (1965)	$1.3 billion (2025)
1960 Agadir earthquake	(Morocco) Morocco	5.9	$120 million (1960)	$1.3 billion (2025)
2019 Albania earthquake	(Albania) Albania	6.4	$1 billion (2019)	$1.3 billion (2025)
1978 Thessaloniki earthquake	(Greece) Greece	6.4	$250 million (1978)	$1.2 billion (2025)
1953 Ionian earthquake	(Greece) Greece	6.8	$100 million (1953)	$1.2 billion (2025)
2003 Miyagi earthquakes	(Japan) Japan	7.0 & 6.0	$644 million (2003)	$1.1 billion (2025)
1976 Bali earthquake	(Indonesia) Indonesia	6.5	$195 million (1976)	$1.1 billion (2025)

== See also ==
- List of earthquakes
- List of natural disasters by cost
- List of disasters by cost
