= 1981 Golbaf earthquake =

Earthquake in Kerman County, Iran

- Location within Iran
- UTC time: 1981-06-11 07:24:25
- ISC event: 625020
- USGS-ANSS: ComCat
- Local date: June 11, 1981
- Local time: 10:54:25 IRST
- Magnitude: 6.6 M_{w} 6.7 M_{s}
- Depth: 18 km (11 mi)
- Epicenter: 29.91°N 57.83°E
- Type: Strike-slip and reverse
- Total damage: $5 million
- Max. intensity: MMI VIII (Severe)
- Foreshocks: No
- Casualties: 3,000 dead 1,400 injured

The 1981 Golbaf earthquake struck the Iranian desert by the village of Golbaf on June 11 at 10:54:25 local time. The shock measured 6.6 on the moment magnitude scale, and had a surface-wave magnitude of 6.7. The shock had a maximum Mercalli intensity of VIII (Severe). Many villages were devastated and financial losses amounted to $5 million (in 1981 USD). Despite the sparsity of the area, 3,000 were killed and 1,400 were injured.

== Tectonic setting ==
Eastern Iran is moving at a rate of approximately 15 mm (0.59 in)/yr with respect to Afghanistan. To accommodate this, the 600 km (370 mi) north-south trending Sabzevaran-Gowk-Nayband fault system began to develop in the western margin of the Dasht-e Lut.

The Gowk fault is a north-northwest trending fault that extends for over 150–180 km (93–112 mi) across the Lut Desert in Kerman Province, Iran. The fault moves dextrally and reverse, and has slipped at a rate of around 3.1–5.7 mm (0.12–0.22 in)/yr for the past 6-8 kyr. (Note: kyr = thousand years) With a strike of 155 degrees, the Gowk fault does not orient itself parallel with the slip in the region. As a result, the Shahdad Thrust system takes up the shortening component of regional slip. The Gowk fault is very active, generating multiple other destructive earthquakes such as the 1981 Sirch earthquake. Despite this activity, a ~90–100 km (56–62 mi) segment in the south of the fault (Sarvestan segment) has remain unbroken, leading to a high potential hazard for future earthquakes.

== Earthquake ==
The M_{w} 6.6, M_{s} 6.7 shock struck near the village of Golbaf at 10:54:25 local time. The earthquake had a maximum Modified Mercalli intensity of VIII (Severe). The complex rupture extended across at least 15 km (9.3 mi) of the Gowk fault system. An eastern segment slipped 3 cm (1.2 in) dextrally and 5 cm (2.0 in) vertically over a 14.5 km (9.0 mi) span. A western segment had little offset over a 7.5 km (4.7 mi) rupture, but fissured along its length. These surficial displacements are far smaller than would be expected for an earthquake of this size, but this can be explained by the depth of the earthquake. Average slip at depth was estimated to be 1.4 m (4 ft 7 in). The earthquake led to a static stress increase of 3.4 bar on the southern Sarvestan segment of the Gowk fault. Additionally, an increase of up to 2 bars to the north helped trigger the later 1981 Sirch earthquake.

=== Aftershocks ===
The earthquake had a few mb 4+ aftershocks for the next couple weeks, but seismicity was not well recorded by teleseismic observations. A month and a half after the mainshock, on July 28, the 1981 Sirch earthquake struck along the Gowk fault in a similar area. Despite nucleating in the same area, it ruptured in a completely different direction, with the rupture zones having no overlap. It caused further destruction to the already severely damaged villages nearby, though killed much fewer people as the populace was living in tents after the original shock.

== Impact ==
The strong earthquake left 3,000 injured and 1,400 killed. Every village in the Golbaf depression was devastated. Losses were estimated at US$5 million (in 1981 dollars).

== See also ==
- List of earthquakes in 1981
- List of earthquakes in Iran
- 1981 Sirch earthquake
