= 1981 Playa Azul earthquake =

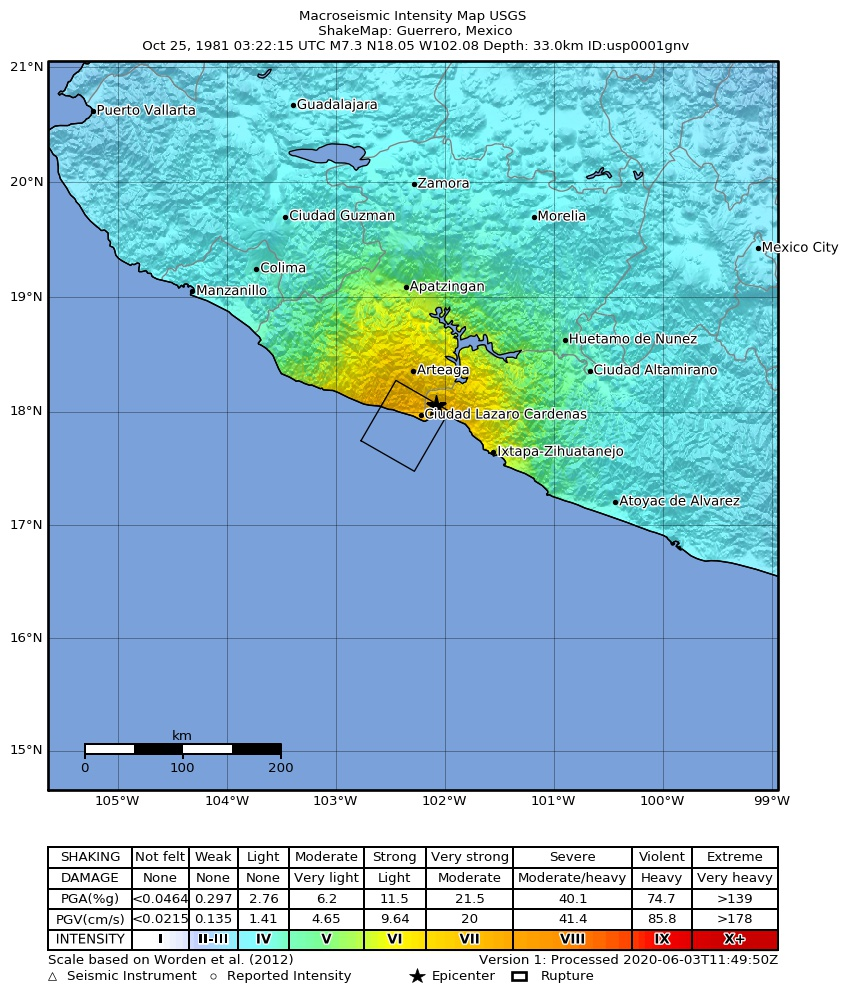
- USGS ShakeMap

- Location within Mexico
- UTC time: 1981-10-25 03:22:15
- ISC event: 610441
- USGS-ANSS: ComCat
- Local date: October 24, 1981
- Local time: 21:22
- Magnitude: 7.2 M_{w} 7.3 M_{s}
- Depth: 33 km (21 mi)
- Epicenter: 18.05°N 102.08°W
- Areas affected: Mexico
- Max. intensity: MMI VIII (Severe)
- Casualties: 3–9 killed, 28 injured

The 1981 Playa Azul earthquake occurred on October 24, 1981, at 21:22 local time (03:22 UTC on October 25). It was located near Playa Azul, Michoacán, Mexico. The magnitude of the earthquake was M_{w} 7.2, or M_{s} 7.3. Three deaths were reported, two from Michoacán and one from Mexico City. Some buildings were damaged in both Michoacán and Mexico City. A small tsunami was registered in Acapulco with a maximum height of 9 cm.

== Tectonic setting ==
The southwestern coast of Mexico lies above the convergent boundary where the Rivera plate and Cocos plate are being subducted beneath the North American plate along the Middle America Trench. The area is seismically very active with large thrust type earthquakes occurring along the plate interface and normal fault type earthquakes occurring at a somewhat deeper level within the descending slab. The plate interface seismicity in this area is strongly segmented, with separate Jalisco, Michoacán, Guerrero and Colima segments being recognised. The southeastern end of the Michoacan segment coincides with the broad Orozco fracture zone within the Cocos plate. During the 1970s, with no major earthquakes recorded since at least 1911, the segment was recognised as a major seismic gap.

== Earthquake ==
This earthquake was an interplate earthquake that occurred in the central part of the Michoacán seismic gap. The 1985 Michoacán earthquake broke the two remaining parts of the Michoacán gap, i.e. those to the north and south of the 1981 Playa Azul earthquake rupture zone. The 1981 Playa Azul earthquake had a focal mechanism of reverse faulting from a shallow-dipping thrust fault. The maximum slip of this earthquake was estimated to be about 4.04 m. According to the calculation of C. Mendoza, along the dipping interface the area of maximum slip was concentrated below the hypocenter, and there was another area of significant slip, of about 1 metre (3.3 ft), above the hypocenter.

== Damage ==
Michoacan suffered widespread damage with some buildings also affected in Mexico City. There were 2 deaths and 17 people injured in Michoacán and 1 death and 11 people injured in Mexico City. One source reports a total of 9 deaths associated with this earthquake.

Power outages and telephone service interruptions were widespread in Mexico City. Thousands of people got stuck in darkness in the Mexico City Metro.

== See also ==
- List of earthquakes in 1981
- List of earthquakes in Mexico
