= Playa Azul, Michoacán =

Playa Azul
- City
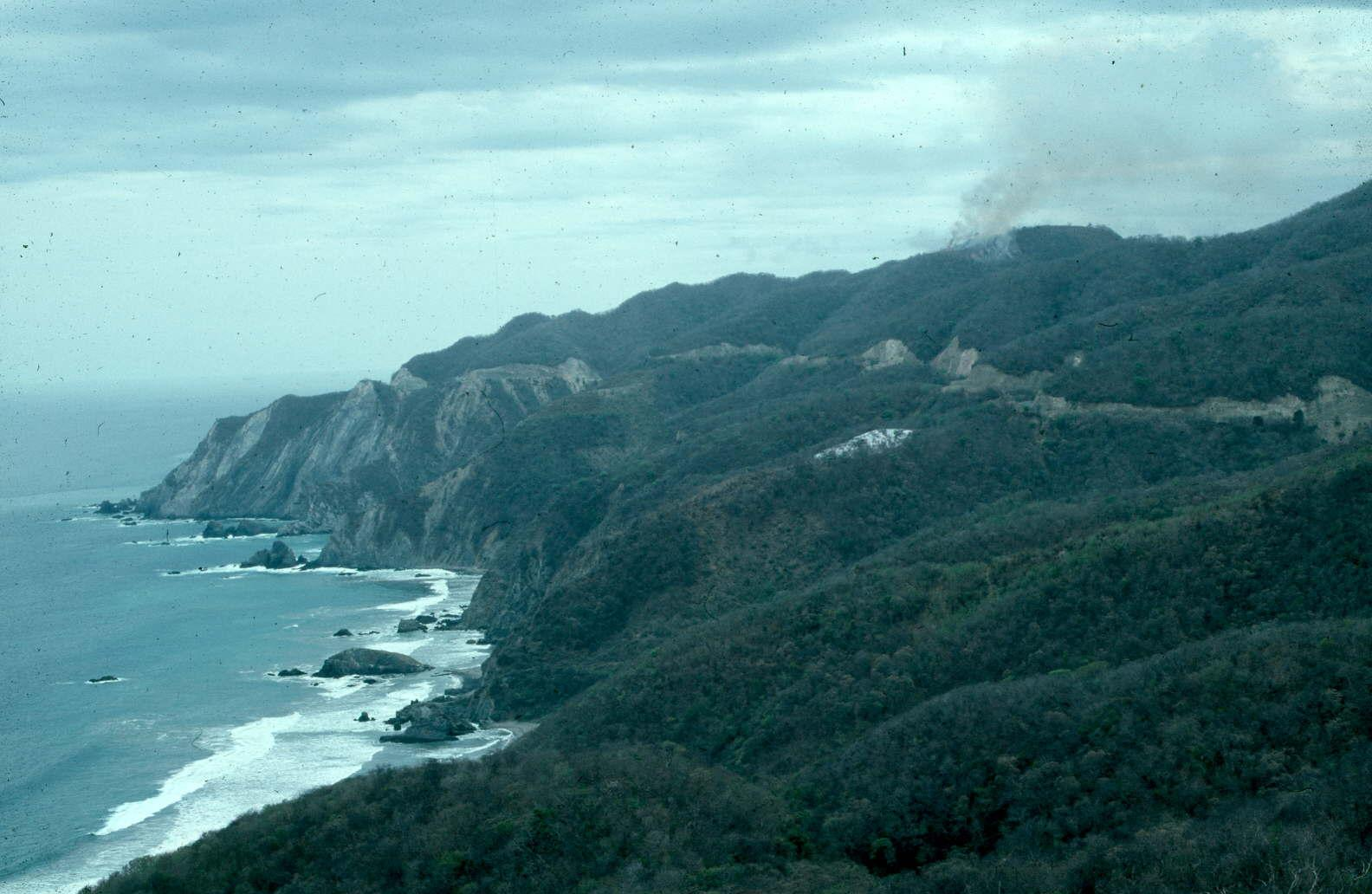

- Location of Playa Azul in Mexico Playa Azul (Mexico)
- Coordinates: 17°58′57″N 102°21′08″W
- Country: Mexico
- State: Michoacán
- Municipality: Lázaro Cárdenas
- Elevation: 2 m (6.6 ft)

Population (2010)
  - Total: 3,139
- Time zone: UTC-6 (Central)

Playa Azul (en: Blue Beach) is a beachside town in the Mexican state of Michoacán. The city lives from tourism and fishing. It is the southern terminus of Federal Highway 37, which connects it with the state of San Luis Potosí.

The town was the epicentre of the Playa Azul earthquake, a magnitude M_{w} 7.2 (M_{s} 7.3) quake that struck on 24 October 1981.

The town was featured in the 2021 racing game Forza Horizon 5.

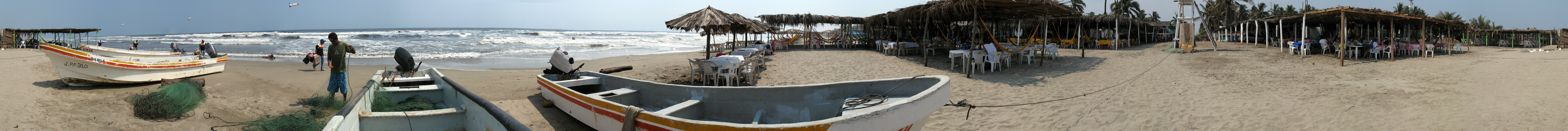
