= 1972 Ruisui earthquake =

Earthquake in Taiwan

- Location within Taiwan
- UTC time: 1972-04-24 09:57:21
- ISC event: 774714
- USGS-ANSS: ComCat
- Local date: April 24, 1972
- Local time: 17:57:21
- Magnitude: 7.2 M_{s}
- Depth: 15 km (9.3 mi)
- Epicenter: 23.5°N 121.4°E
- Areas affected: Taiwan
- Casualties: 5 dead

The 1972 Ruisui earthquake (also known as the 1972 Juisui earthquake) occurred on April 24 at 17:57 local time. The magnitude of this earthquake was given as M_{s} 7.2 by the United States Geological Survey and M_{L} 6.9 by the Central Weather Bureau of Taiwan. The epicenter was located near Ruisui Township, Hualien County, Taiwan. The intensity was shindo 4 in Taipei and Hualien. Five people were reported dead. The Ruisui Bridge (Chinese: 瑞穗大橋) was destroyed. The water treatment plant in Ruisui was damaged.

This earthquake was caused by the Ruisui Fault with a vertical movement of 70 centimeters (28 in). The Juisui Fault is a segment of the 150 kilometers (93 mi) long Longitudinal Valley Fault, which is a left-lateral fault with a reverse component. The boundary between the Eurasian plate and the Philippine Plate lies along the Longitudinal Valley Fault.

== See also ==
- Huatung Valley (or Longitudinal Valley)
- List of earthquakes in 1972
- List of earthquakes in Taiwan
