= List of earthquakes in 1981 =

Earthquakes in 1981
Approximate epicenters of the earthquakes in 1981
- 4.0–5.9 magnitude
- 6.0–6.9 magnitude
- 7.0–7.9 magnitude
- 8.0+ magnitude
- Strongest: 7.7 M_{w} Samoa
- Deadliest: 6.7 M_{w} Iran; 3,000 deaths.
- Total fatalities: 6,762

Number by magnitude
- 9.0+: 0
- 8.0–8.9: 0
- 7.0–7.9: 10
- 6.0–6.9: 76
- 5.0–5.9: 1,176
- 4.0–4.9: 3,160

This is a list of earthquakes in 1981. Earthquakes of less than magnitude 6 are not included, unless they result in damage and/or casualties, or are notable for some other reason. Events in remote areas will not be listed but included in statistics and maps. Countries are entered on the lists in order of their status in this particular year. All dates are listed according to UTC time. Maximum intensities are indicated on the Modified Mercalli intensity scale and are sourced from United States Geological Survey (USGS) ShakeMap data. 1981 was another year of below average activity. The number of magnitude 7.0+ events was higher than in 1980, but at 10 was still below normal. The largest event was a magnitude 7.7 which struck Samoa in September. Other areas impacted by large events were Greece, New Zealand, Mexico, and Chile. Out of the 6,700 deaths in 1981, the majority were in Iran. Over the summer there were two large events caused 3,000 deaths and 1,500 deaths. In January, Indonesia and China were struck by events which left a combined 450 deaths.

== By death toll ==
Rank	Death toll	Magnitude	Location	MMI	Depth (km)	Date
1	3,000	6.7	Iran, Kerman Province	VIII (Severe)	33.0	June 11
1	1,500	7.1	Iran, Kerman Province	X (Extreme)	33.0	July 28
2	305	6.7	Indonesia, Papua (province)	VII (Very strong)	33.0	January 19
3	220	6.2	Pakistan, Gilgit-Baltistan	VI (Strong)	33.0	September 12
4	150	6.8	China, Sichuan Province	IX (Violent)	33.0	January 23
5	22	6.7	Greece, Thessaly	IX (Violent)	33.0	February 24
6	15	5.4	Colombia, Norte de Santander Department	VII (Very strong)	53.6	October 18
7	12	4.6	Italy, Campania	VIII (Severe)	10.0	February 14
8	10	5.2	Peru, Huancavelica Region	VI (Strong)	23.7	June 22

Listed are earthquakes with at least 10 dead.

== By magnitude ==
Rank	Magnitude	Death toll	Location	MMI	Depth (km)	Date
1	7.7	1	Western Samoa	VI (Strong)	25.0	September 1
2	7.6	0	New Zealand, off the south coast of South Island	IV (Light)	33.0	May 25
3	7.3	3	Mexico, Guerrero	VIII (Severe)	33.0	October 25
= 4	7.2	1	Chile, off the coast of Valparaíso Region	VI (Strong)	33.0	October 16
= 4	7.2	0	Greece, Aegean Sea	VII (Very strong)	10.0	December 19
= 5	7.1	3,000	Iran, Kerman Province	X (Extreme)	33.0	July 28
= 5	7.1	0	New Zealand, Kermadec Islands	( )	33.0	December 26
= 6	7.0	0	United States, Near Islands, Alaska	V (Moderate)	33.0	January 30
= 6	7.0	0	France, southeast of the Loyalty Islands, New Caledonia	( )	33.0	July 6
= 6	7.0	0	Vanuatu	V (Moderate)	30.0	July 15

Listed are earthquakes with at least 7.0 magnitude.

== By month ==
=== January ===
January
- Strongest: 7.0 M_{w} United States
- Deadliest: 6.8 M_{w} Indonesia; 305 deaths
- Total fatalities: 455

Number by magnitude
- 8.0–8.9: 0
- 7.0–7.9: 1
- 6.0–6.9: 11
- 5.0–5.9: 125
- 4.0–4.9: 233

Date	Country and location	M_{w}	Depth (km)	MMI	Notes	Casualties	
Date	Country and location	M_{w}	Depth (km)	MMI	Notes	Dead	Injured
18	Japan, off the east coast of Honshu	6.9	33.0	V	A large foreshock of magnitude 6.2 struck minutes earlier.		
19	Indonesia, Papua (province)	6.7	33.0	VII	305 people were killed in the 1981 Irian Jaya earthquake. At least 51 people were injured. Property damage costs were $5 million (1981 rate).	305	51
22	Japan, off the east coast of Honshu	6.4	20.0		Aftershock of January 18 event.		
23	Japan, southern Hokkaido	6.3	116.0	VI			
23	China, Sichuan Province	6.8	33.0	IX	The 1981 Dawu earthquake caused 150 deaths and 489 injuries. 2,992 homes were destroyed. Costs reached $5 million (1981 rate).	150	489
30	United States, Rat Islands, Alaska	7.0	33.0	V			

=== February ===
February
- Strongest: 6.7 M_{w} 2 events reached this magnitude.
- Deadliest: 6.7 M_{w} Greece; 22 deaths
- Total fatalities: 38

Number by magnitude
- 8.0–8.9: 0
- 7.0–7.9: 0
- 6.0–6.9: 6
- 5.0–5.9: 101
- 4.0–4.9: 248

Date	Country and location	M_{w}	Depth (km)	MMI	Notes	Casualties	
Date	Country and location	M_{w}	Depth (km)	MMI	Notes	Dead	Injured
1	Algeria, Aïn Defla Province	5.7	10.0	VII	Homes that were previously damaged in the 1980 El Asnam earthquake in October 1980 were destroyed.		
14	Italy, Campania	4.6	10.0	VIII	12 people died and some property damage was reported. Costs were $500,000 (1981 rate).	12	
17	France, southeast of Loyalty Islands, New Caledonia	6.7	29.9				
18	South Africa, western Transvaal (part of the present-day province of North West)	4.7	33.0	VI	4 deaths were caused in a mine.	4	
24	Greece, Thessaly	6.7	33.0	IX	The 1981 Gulf of Corinth earthquakes were a series of events that caused destruction across central Greece in late February and early March. This event left 22 people dead and 400 injured. 8,000 homes were destroyed. Damage costs were $812 million (1981 rate).	22	400
25	Greece, Gulf of Corinth	6.4	33.0	IX	Further casualties and damage were caused.		

=== March ===
March
- Strongest: 6.4 M_{w} 2 events reached this magnitude.
- Deadliest: 5.6 M_{w} Greece; 2 deaths
- Total fatalities: 4

Number by magnitude
- 8.0–8.9: 0
- 7.0–7.9: 0
- 6.0–6.9: 5
- 5.0–5.9: 111
- 4.0–4.9: 242

Date	Country and location	M_{w}	Depth (km)	MMI	Notes	Casualties	
Date	Country and location	M_{w}	Depth (km)	MMI	Notes	Dead	Injured
4	Greece, Thessaly	6.4	28.5	IX	The 1981 Gulf of Corinth earthquakes were a series of events that caused destruction across central Greece in late February and early March. 1 person was killed and 9 people were injured. Further damage was caused.	1	9
7	Greece, Attica (region)	5.5	33.0	VI	1 person died and further damage was caused.	1	
10	Greece, Epirus	5.6	31.1	VIII	2 people were killed and 150 homes were destroyed.	2	
23	Chile, off the coast of Valparaíso Region	6.2	46.3	VI			

=== April ===
April
- Strongest: 6.9 M_{w} Vanuatu
- Deadliest: 5.3 M_{w} Peru; 8 deaths
- Total fatalities: 8

Number by magnitude
- 8.0–8.9: 0
- 7.0–7.9: 0
- 6.0–6.9: 5
- 5.0–5.9: 84
- 4.0–4.9: 265

Date	Country and location	M_{w}	Depth (km)	MMI	Notes	Casualties	
Date	Country and location	M_{w}	Depth (km)	MMI	Notes	Dead	Injured
18	Peru, Ayacucho Region	5.3	38.3	V	8 people died and another 15 were hurt. Some property damage was caused.	8	15
24	Vanuatu	6.9	33.0	VII			
26	United States, southern California	5.8	18.9	VIII	$1.5 million (1981 rate) in damages was caused by the 1981 Westmorland earthquake.		

=== May ===
May
- Strongest: 7.6 M_{w} New Zealand
- Total fatalities: 0

Number by magnitude
- 8.0–8.9: 0
- 7.0–7.9: 1
- 6.0–6.9: 5
- 5.0–5.9: 97
- 4.0–4.9: 247

Date	Country and location	M_{w}	Depth (km)	MMI	Notes	Casualties	
Date	Country and location	M_{w}	Depth (km)	MMI	Notes	Dead	Injured
2	Afghanistan, Badakhshan Province	6.3	228.7	IV			
6	Ecuador, off the coast of Santa Elena Province	6.4	33.0	VI			
25	New Zealand, off the south coast of South Island	7.6	33.0	IV			
27	Greece, Western Greece	5.0	33.0	V	9 homes were destroyed and 100 were damaged.		
28	Papua New Guinea, East New Britain Province	6.0	70.5	V			

=== June ===
June
- Strongest: 6.7 M_{w} Iran
- Deadliest: 6.7 M_{w} Iran; 3,000 deaths
- Total fatalities: 3,011

Number by magnitude
- 8.0–8.9: 0
- 7.0–7.9: 0
- 6.0–6.9: 7
- 5.0–5.9: 90
- 4.0–4.9: 266

Date	Country and location	M_{w}	Depth (km)	MMI	Notes	Casualties	
Date	Country and location	M_{w}	Depth (km)	MMI	Notes	Dead	Injured
1	Tonga	6.0	33.0				
7	Italy, western Sicily	4.9	18.7	V	6 injuries were caused as well as damage to 100 homes.		6
9	China, southern Qinghai Province	6.0	10.0	VIII			
11	Iran, Kerman Province	6.7	33.0	VIII	Joint deadliest event in 1981.The 1981 Golbaf earthquake caused 3,000 deaths and at least 101 injuries. Major damage was caused. Costs reached $5 million (1981 rate).	3,000	101
13	Afghanistan, Samangan Province	5.5	24.0	VI	1 person died and 2 were injured.	1	2
22	Peru, Huancavelica Region	5.2	23.7	VI	10 people were killed and at least 51 were injured. Some property damage was caused with costs reaching $5 million (1981 rate).	10	51

=== July ===
July
- Strongest: 7.1 M_{w} Iran
- Deadliest: 7.1 M_{w} Iran; 1,500 deaths
- Total fatalities: 1,500

Number by magnitude
- 8.0–8.9: 0
- 7.0–7.9: 3
- 6.0–6.9: 3
- 5.0–5.9: 100
- 4.0–4.9: 343

Date	Country and location	M_{w}	Depth (km)	MMI	Notes	Casualties	
Date	Country and location	M_{w}	Depth (km)	MMI	Notes	Dead	Injured
6	France, southeast of the Loyalty Islands, New Caledonia	7.0	33.0				
15	Vanuatu	7.0	30.0	V	Some damage was caused.		
23	Iran, West Azarbaijan Province	5.6	33.0	VII	Damage was sustained in several villages.		
28	Iran, Kerman Province	7.1	33.0	X	Joint deadliest event in 1981. This was the second major event in Iran in the space of 6 weeks. 1,500 people died in the 1981 Sirch earthquake. 1,000 people were injured. Extensive damage was caused. Costs were $1 billion (1981 rate).	1,500	1,000

=== August ===
August
- Strongest: 6.0 M_{w} Soviet Union, Russia
- Total fatalities: 0

Number by magnitude
- 8.0–8.9: 0
- 7.0–7.9: 0
- 6.0–6.9: 1
- 5.0–5.9: 78
- 4.0–4.9: 283

Date	Country and location	M_{w}	Depth (km)	MMI	Notes	Casualties	
Date	Country and location	M_{w}	Depth (km)	MMI	Notes	Dead	Injured
13	Yugoslavia, SR Bosnia and Herzegovina	5.5	15.5	VIII	44 people were hurt and some damage was caused. Costs were $5 million (1981 rate).		44

=== September ===
September
- Strongest: 7.7 M_{w} Western Samoa
- Deadliest: 6.2 M_{w} Pakistan; 220 deaths
- Total fatalities: 221

Number by magnitude
- 8.0–8.9: 0
- 7.0–7.9: 1
- 6.0–6.9: 9
- 5.0–5.9: 102
- 4.0–4.9: 309

Date	Country and location	M_{w}	Depth (km)	MMI	Notes	Casualties	
Date	Country and location	M_{w}	Depth (km)	MMI	Notes	Dead	Injured
1	Western Samoa	7.7	25.0	VI	Largest event in 1981 A tsunami was observed which swept ashore on some of the islands. At least 1 person drowned and some damage was caused.	1	
3	Soviet Union, Kuril Islands, Russia	6.6	45.0	VI	Some damage was caused.		
4	Philippines, Bohol	6.0	644.5	VII			
12	Pakistan, Gilgit-Baltistan	6.2	33.0	VI	During the 1981 Darel Valley earthquake, 220 people were killed and 2,500 were injured. Major damage was reported. Costs were at least $5 million (1981 rate).	220	2,500
13	Soviet Union, East Kazakhstan Region, Kazakhstan	6.0	0.0		Nuclear test.		
17	France, southeast of the Loyalty Islands, New Caledonia	6.6	30.0				

=== October ===
October
- Strongest: 7.3 M_{w} Mexico
- Deadliest: 5.4 M_{w} Colombia; 15 deaths
- Total fatalities: 19

Number by magnitude
- 8.0–8.9: 0
- 7.0–7.9: 2
- 6.0–6.9: 8
- 5.0–5.9: 91
- 4.0–4.9: 229

Date	Country and location	M_{w}	Depth (km)	MMI	Notes	Casualties	
Date	Country and location	M_{w}	Depth (km)	MMI	Notes	Dead	Injured
4	Papua New Guinea, off the east coast	6.3	33.0	VI			
9	Solomon Islands	6.4	50.2	V			
15	Japan, off the east coast of Honshu	6.0	47.0	IV			
16	Chile, off the coast of Valparaíso Region	7.2	33.0	IV	1 person was killed indirectly in a car accident.	1	
18	Soviet Union, East Kazakhstan Region, Kazakhstan	6.0	0.0		Nuclear test.		
18	Colombia, Norte de Santander Department	5.4	53.6	VII	15 deaths were caused as well as at least 101 injuries. Major damage was reported.	15	101
25	Mexico, Guerrero	7.3	33.0	VIII	3 people were killed and 28 were injured in the 1981 Playa Azul earthquake. Some damage was caused.	3	28

=== November ===
November
- Strongest: 6.9 M_{w} Papua New Guinea
- Total fatalities: 0

Number by magnitude
- 8.0–8.9: 0
- 7.0–7.9: 0
- 6.0–6.9: 11
- 5.0–5.9: 96
- 4.0–4.9: 226

Date	Country and location	M_{w}	Depth (km)	MMI	Notes	Casualties	
Date	Country and location	M_{w}	Depth (km)	MMI	Notes	Dead	Injured
4	Tonga	6.3	33.0	VI			
6	Papua New Guinea, off the coast of East Sepik Province	6.9	33.0	VIII	Some damage was reported.		
7	Chile, Valparaíso Region	6.8	65.2	VII	Some damage was reported.		
8	China, Hebei Province	5.5	14.0	VII	Some damage was reported.		
14	Egypt, Aswan Governorate	5.3	10.0	VIII	11 homes sustained damage.		
22	Philippines, off the north coast of Luzon	6.5	24.0	VI	Some damage was caused.		
24	France, southeast of the Loyalty Islands, New Caledonia	6.7	29.8		A magnitude 6.2 aftershock struck shortly afterward.		

=== December ===
December
- Strongest: 7.2 M_{w} Greece
- Deadliest: 4.6 M_{w} Pakistan; 6 deaths
- Total fatalities: 6

Number by magnitude
- 8.0–8.9: 0
- 7.0–7.9: 2
- 6.0–6.9: 5
- 5.0–5.9: 101
- 4.0–4.9: 269

Date	Country and location	M_{w}	Depth (km)	MMI	Notes	Casualties	
Date	Country and location	M_{w}	Depth (km)	MMI	Notes	Dead	Injured
12	Pakistan, Balochistan, Pakistan	4.6	33.0	IV	6 people were killed and 12 were hurt. 45 homes were damaged or destroyed.	6	12
19	Greece, Aegean Sea	7.2	10.0	VII	Some damage was caused.		
24	New Zealand, Kermadec Islands	6.8	28.0		Foreshock to December 26 event.		
26	New Zealand, Kermadec Islands	7.1	33.0				
27	Soviet Union, East Kazakhstan Region, Kazakhstan	6.2	0.0		Nuclear test.		
27	Greece, Aegean Sea	6.5	13.3	VI	Aftershock of December 19 event. Some damage was caused.		
