= 1981 Darel Valley earthquake =

Earthquake in Pakistan

- Location within Pakistan
- UTC time: 1981-09-12 07:15:54
- ISC event: 611344
- USGS-ANSS: ComCat
- Local date: September 12, 1981
- Local time: 12:15 PST
- Magnitude: M_{w} 6.1
- Depth: 13.0 km (8.1 mi)
- Epicenter: 35.68°N 73.68°E
- Casualties: 220 dead

The 1981 Darel Valley earthquake resulted in 220 fatalities and 3,000 injured. It occurred on September 12 at 12:15 PST, affecting the mountainous region of northern Pakistan. The earthquake measured 6.1 M_{w} at a depth of 13.0 km (8.1 mi).

== Earthquake ==
The Hindu Kush mountains of northern Pakistan is the epicenter of intermediate-depth earthquakes with hypocenters up to 300 km (190 mi) beneath the region. Shallow seismic activity, however, are uncommon. Shallow strike-slip, normal and thrust faulting were proposed as the mechanism of these earthquakes. The earthquake was one of three shallow and destructive events within a 10-year period, with the first two occurring in 1972 and 1974, respectively. Shallow thrust faulting along a high-angle fault plane was the cause of the mainshock.

== Damage ==
An official death toll of 220 was reported; the relatively low death toll was attributed to the earthquake occurring in the day; had it occur at night, thousands may have been killed by collapsing homes. At least 3,387 homes were destroyed, and about twice more cattle shelters were razed. In addition, 1,447 livestock died from rockslides. Many homes which collapsed were constructed of heavy materials. Roadways were destroyed by landslides. Due to the nonexistent communication system in the area, news of the earthquake did not reach authorities until the following day. Many irrigation canals were destroyed, affecting local agriculture harvest.

Pakistani authorities intended for a team of doctors and mule to carry relief supplies to the area, but due to slow progress hampered by inaccessibility, the plan was called off 14 hours later. Survivors said that there was no assistance for three days. Helicopters were deployed to transport doctors and evacuate the injured. Aircraft arrived with air-dropped food. Despite the swift response by authorities, a lack of funds meant additional resources could not be obtained for survivors.

== See also ==
- List of earthquakes in 1981
- List of earthquakes in Pakistan
