= 1981 Irian Jaya earthquake =

Earthquake in Indonesia

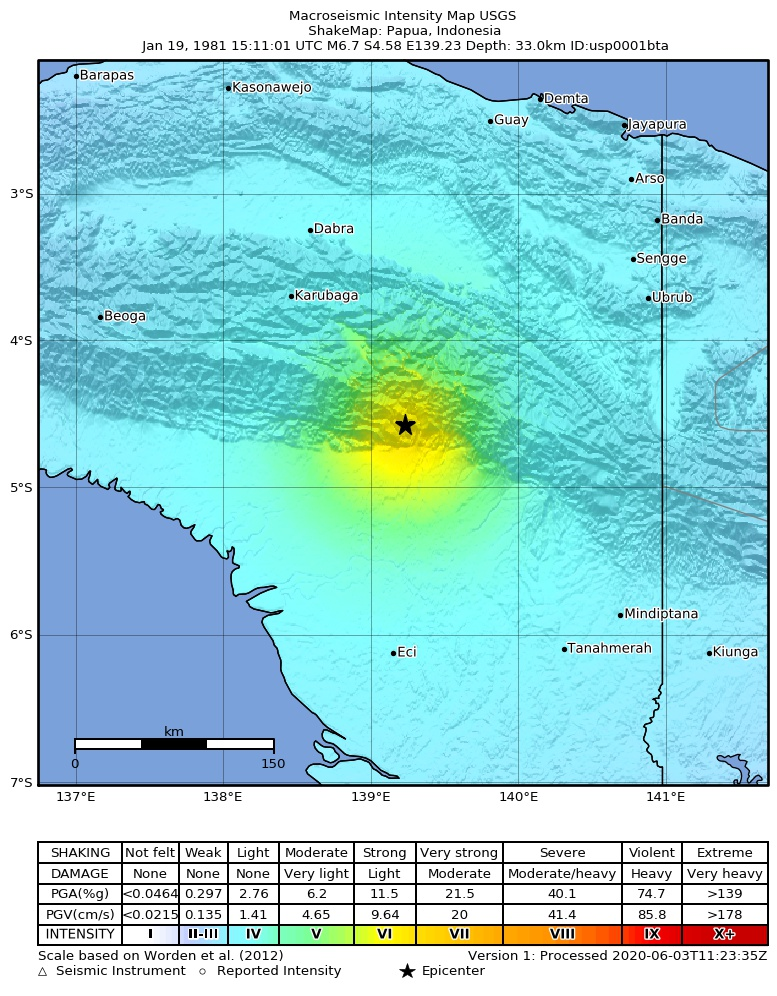
- USGS ShakeMap

- Location within Highland Papua Location within Indonesia
- UTC time: 1981-01-19 15:11:01
- ISC event: 632891
- USGS-ANSS: ComCat
- Local date: January 20, 1981
- Local time: 00:11:01 WIT
- Magnitude: 6.7 M_{w}
- Depth: 33.0 km (20.5 mi)
- Epicenter: 4.58°S 139.23°E
- Areas affected: Irian Jaya (now Highland Papua), Indonesia
- Max. intensity: MMI VII (Very strong)
- Casualties: 305 dead, 1,000+ missing

Shortly after midnight local time on January 20 (January 19, UTC), 1981, eastern Indonesia was struck by an earthquake known as the 1981 Irian Jaya earthquake. Registering a moment magnitude of 6.7, it killed more than 300 people, damaging structures and buildings across the Irian Jaya province. Indonesia is highly active in terms of seismicity and volcanic eruptions, with a subduction zone and many faults. It is neighbored by several tectonic plates. Such earthquakes pose a significant threat to life in the area through earthquakes and also tsunamis.

== Geology ==
Indonesia, one of the most seismically active places in the world, hosts hundreds of islands, many with volcanoes. It is an island arc, composed by a subduction zone (in the Sunda Trench) and islands. Unlike most subduction zones, the Sunda Trench is parallel to the chain of islands to which it corresponds, creating strike-slip faulting. Indonesia itself is surrounded by multiple tectonic plates – namely the Pacific, the Southeast Asia lithospheric, and the Indo-Australian plates – causing it to be a so-called hotspot for both seismic and volcanic activity. The epicenter was in Papua Province, in the Irian Jaya Province. The orientation and type of faulting is uncertain, due to a poorly constrained focal mechanism but is thought to have been a reverse fault.

== Damage and casualties ==
Spawning enormous landslides, the earthquake left at least 305 people dead and more than 1,000 missing. Entire villages were covered by debris. It was described as "strong" by The New York Times. The earthquake caused huge landslides, which cascaded into the villages below the mountains, destroying more than 150 homes. The debris from these flows blocked transportation by road, "cutting off more than 2,000 area residents". Relief efforts took several days.

== Future threats ==
Indonesia is known for deadly earthquakes, primarily the 2004 Indian Ocean earthquake and tsunami, which killed more than 227,000 people. Earthquakes along the subduction zone at Sunda and on the Great Sumatran fault pose a serious threat to life, especially in the form of tsunamis. A 2005 study found that stress on at least these two zones was at a heightened level, and both have been active. The Sunda Trench zone has since produced the 2006 Pangandaran earthquake and tsunami, while the Great Sumatran fault has not produced an earthquake since the 2004 event.

== See also ==
- 1976 Papua earthquake
- 1989 West Papua earthquake
- List of earthquakes in 1981
- List of earthquakes in Indonesia
