= 1981 Gulf of Corinth earthquakes =

Earthquakes in Greece

- UTC time
- A: 1981-02-24 20:53:38
- B: 1981-02-25 02:35:53
- C: 1981-03-04 21:58:05
- ISC event
- A: 631767
- B: 631819
- C: 629205
- USGS-ANSS
- A: ComCat
- B: ComCat
- C: ComCat
- Local date
- A: 24 February 1981
- B: 25 February 1981
- C: 4 March 1981
- Magnitude
- A: 6.7 M_{s}
- B: 6.4 M_{s}
- C: 6.4 M_{s}
- Depth
- A: 33.0 km
- B: 33.0 km
- C: 28.5 km
- Epicentre: 38.222°N 22.934°E
- Type: Normal
- Areas affected: Greece, Gulf of Corinth, Athens
- Total damage: $812 million
- Max. intensity: MMI IX (Violent)
- Tsunami: minor
- Casualties: 22 dead, 400 injured

In early 1981 the eastern part of the Gulf of Corinth in Greece was struck by three earthquakes with a magnitude greater than 6 M_{s} over a period of 11 days. The earthquake sequence caused widespread damage in the Corinth–Athens area, destroying nearly 8,000 houses and causing 20–22 deaths.

== Tectonic setting ==
The Gulf of Corinth is an area of active extensional tectonics. The underlying cause of this extension has been attributed to rollback of the African plate as it subducts northwards beneath the Aegean Plate. Other possible mechanisms include gravitational collapse of crust overthickened during the Paleogene to early Neogene or the effects of the continuing propagation of the North Anatolian Fault towards the southwest.

The rift that formed the Gulf of Corinth is bounded by large normal faults that vary in their polarity (dip direction) along its length. The eastern end of the rift, which forms the Alkyonides Gulf, is dominated by north-dipping faults, including the Perachora, Straya, Skinos, Pisia, West Alkyonides and East Alkyonides faults. Immediately to the east, the large south-dipping Kaparelli Fault forms the northern boundary to the onshore continuation of the rift zone.

== Earthquake sequence ==
The first earthquake in the sequence occurred at 20:53 UTC on 24 February. It had a magnitude of 6.7 M_{s} and a maximum felt intensity of IX (violent) on the Modified Mercalli intensity scale (MMI). The epicentre was at the western end of the Alkyonides Gulf and involved rupture of the Pisia Fault and possibly the Skinos Fault. The assignment of the observed surface ruptures to the first two earthquakes in the sequence remains uncertain as they occurred over the same night. The maximum measured offset on the Pisia Fault was 150 cm, while that on the Skinos Fault was 100 cm.

The second earthquake occurred less than 6 hours later at 02:35 UTC on 25 February, with a magnitude of 6.4 M_{s}, also with a maximum felt intensity of IX (MMI). The epicentre was in the central part of the Alkyonides Gulf and involved the rupture of the Skinos Fault and possibly the Pisia Fault.

The final earthquake in the sequence occurred over ten days later at 21:58 UTC on 4 March, also with a magnitude of 6.4 M_{s} and a maximum felt intensity of IX (MMI). The epicentre was just to the east of the Alkyonides Gulf and involved the rupture of the Kaparelli Fault, with a maximum observed displacement of 100 cm.

Analysis of stress changes associated with the February 24 earthquake show increases on the fault segments that ruptured during the other two events.

== Damage ==
The effects of the first two earthquakes are treated together due to their close spacing, with a single isoseismal map being produced. The area of violent shaking (level IX MMI) was along the southern coast of the Alkyonides Gulf, with a much larger area experiencing severe shaking (level VIII MMI) extending from Xylokastro in the west to beyond Megara in the east, including the city of Corinth. The area of very strong shaking (level VII MMI) included Athens, with some parts of the city experiencing shaking of VIII to IX depending on ground conditions.

The final earthquake also produced an area that experienced shaking of IX MMI, including the villages of Kalamaki and Plataies. The area of level VIII shaking included the city of Thebes.

In total the earthquake sequence caused the destruction of 7,701 buildings (of which 1,175 were in Athens) with a further 20,954 being seriously affected (7,824 in Athens). Three administrative areas were affected, Attica, Beotia and Corinthia. The number of fatalities was in the range 20–22, with between a further 400 and 500 people injured. In Athens, the eastern façade of the Parthenon in the Acropolis was damaged and later had to be restored.

Both onshore and offshore areas were affected by landslides with one large underwater slump possibly the cause of the observed local tsunami. Liquefaction and ground fissures were reported from several areas.

== See also ==
- List of earthquakes in 1981
- List of earthquakes in Greece
- 1999 Athens earthquake
