= List of earthquakes in 1972 =

Earthquakes in 1972
Approximate epicenters of the earthquakes in 1972
- 4.0–5.9 magnitude
- 6.0–6.9 magnitude
- 7.0–7.9 magnitude
- 8.0+ magnitude
- Strongest magnitude: Philippines, off the east coast of Mindanao (Magnitude 8.0) December 2
- Deadliest: Nicaragua, Managua (Magnitude 6.3) December 23 10,000 deaths
- Total fatalities: 15,498

Number by magnitude
- 9.0+: 0

This is a list of earthquakes in 1972. Only magnitude 6.0 or greater earthquakes appear on the list. Lower magnitude events are included if they have caused death, injury or damage. Events which occurred in remote areas will be excluded from the list as they wouldn't have generated significant media interest. All dates are listed according to UTC time. Maximum intensities are indicated on the Mercalli intensity scale and are sourced from United States Geological Survey (USGS) ShakeMap data. The death toll of just over 15,000 was dominated by 2 events. In April, an earthquake struck Iran resulting in 5,374 of the deaths. This was one of the worst disasters in Iranian history. Late in December, Managua, Nicaragua was severely affected by a fairly modest magnitude 6.3 event. The location however contributed to 10,000 deaths and major destruction to the city. Activity was around normal for the year with 16 events exceeding magnitude 7.0. The largest struck the Philippines in December and measured 8.0. Taiwan, the Philippines and the southwest Pacific Islands had heightened seismic activity.

== Overall ==
=== By death toll ===
| Rank | Death toll | Magnitude | Location | MMI | Depth (km) | Date |
|---|---|---|---|---|---|---|
| 1 | 10,000 | 6.3 | Nicaragua, Managua | IX (Violent) | 10.0 | December 23 |
| 2 | 5,374 | 6.6 | Iran, Fars province | X (Extreme) | 10.0 | April 10 |
| 3 | 100 | 6.2 | Pakistan, Gilgit-Baltistan | VI (Strong) | 30.0 | September 3 |
| 4 | 11 | 6.3 | Afghanistan, Baghlan Province | VI (Strong) | 24.0 | June 24 |

- Note: At least 10 casualties

=== By magnitude ===
| Rank | Magnitude | Death toll | Location | MMI | Depth (km) | Date |
|---|---|---|---|---|---|---|
| 1 | 8.0 | 0 | Philippines, off the east coast of Mindanao | VII (Very strong) | 60.0 | December 2 |
| 2 | 7.7 | 0 | Celebes Sea | V (Moderate) | 330.8 | June 11 |
| 3 | 7.6 | 0 | United States, off the southeast coast of Alaska | VII (Very strong) | 25.0 | July 30 |
| = 4 | 7.5 | 0 | Philippines, Mindoro | VIII (Severe) | 25.0 | April 25 |
| = 4 | 7.5 | 0 | Australia, southeast of New Britain, Papua New Guinea | V (Moderate) | 20.0 | August 17 |
| = 5 | 7.4 | 0 | United Kingdom, Santa Cruz Islands, Solomon Islands | VII (Very strong) | 101.8 | February 14 |
| = 5 | 7.4 | 0 | Japan, Izu Islands | X (Extreme) | 55.0 | December 4 |
| 6 | 7.3 | 1 | Taiwan, off the east coast of | VI (Strong) | 25.0 | January 25 |
| = 7 | 7.2 | 0 | Japan, Izu Islands | X (Extreme) | 59.8 | February 29 |
| = 7 | 7.2 | 0 | Fiji, south of | ( ) | 495.8 | March 30 |
| = 7 | 7.2 | 0 | Australia, west of Bougainville Island, Papua New Guinea | ( ) | 409.9 | April 28 |
| = 8 | 7.1 | 0 | Taiwan, off the east coast of | V (Moderate) | 25.0 | January 25 |
| = 8 | 7.1 | 0 | Tonga | ( ) | 222.1 | May 22 |
| = 9 | 7.0 | 0 | New Hebrides, Vanuatu | VII (Very strong) | 35.0 | January 23 |
| = 9 | 7.0 | 0 | Taiwan, off the east coast of Taiwan | VII (Very strong) | 22.2 | April 24 |
| = 9 | 7.0 | 0 | France, Loyalty Islands, New Caledonia | VII (Very strong) | 20.0 | November 2 |

- Note: At least 7.0 magnitude

== Notable events ==
=== January ===
January
- Strongest magnitude: 7.3 M_{w} Taiwan
- Deadliest: 7.3 M_{w} Taiwan; 1 death
- Total fatalities: 1

Number by magnitude
- 8.0–8.9: 0
- 7.0–7.9: 3
- 6.0–6.9: 13

| Date | Country and location | M_{w} | Depth (km) | MMI | Notes | Casualties | |
| Date | Country and location | M_{w} | Depth (km) | MMI | Notes | Dead | Injured |
|---|---|---|---|---|---|---|---|
| 1 | Fiji | 6.8 | 10.0 | | | | |
| 4 | Taiwan, off the east coast | 6.9 | 28.0 | VI | Foreshock to event on January 25. | | |
| 6 | Australia, East New Britain Province, Papua New Guinea | 6.1 | 162.3 | IV | | | |
| 7 | Indonesia, Papua (province) | 6.0 | 30.0 | VI | | | |
| 8 | Taiwan, south of | 6.7 | 25.0 | | | | |
| 12 | Brazil, Amazonas (Brazilian state) | 6.4 | 569.1 | | | | |
| 15 | China, southern Xinjiang Province | 6.2 | 10.2 | VIII | | | |
| 18 | Australia, Madang Province, Papua New Guinea | 6.6 | 25.7 | rowspan="2"| Doublet earthquake. | | | |
| 19 | Australia, Madang Province, Papua New Guinea | 6.6 | 20.0 | VII | | | |
| 20 | Afghanistan, Badakhshan Province | 6.2 | 211.9 | IV | | | |
| 21 | Brazil, Amazonas (Brazilian state) | 6.1 | 563.7 | | Aftershock of event from January 12. | | |
| 23 | New Hebrides, Vanuatu | 7.0 | 35.0 | VII | | | |
| 25 | Taiwan, off the east coast | 7.3 | 25.0 | rowspan="2"| 1 person died and 5 homes collapsed. Some damage was reported. Doublet earthquake. | 1 | | |
| 25 | Taiwan, off the east coast | 7.1 | 25.0 | VI | | | |
| 26 | Fiji | 6.5 | 643.0 | | | | |
| 28 | New Hebrides, Vanuatu | 6.3 | 125.0 | | | | |

=== February ===
February
- Strongest magnitude: 7.4 M_{w} United Kingdom, Solomon Islands
- Deadliest: 4.8 M_{w} Italy; 1 death
- Total fatalities: 1

Number by magnitude
- 8.0–8.9: 0
- 7.0–7.9: 2
- 6.0–6.9: 3

| Date | Country and location | M_{w} | Depth (km) | MMI | Notes | Casualties | |
| Date | Country and location | M_{w} | Depth (km) | MMI | Notes | Dead | Injured |
|---|---|---|---|---|---|---|---|
| 4 | Italy, offshore Ancona | 4.8 | 25.0 | | 1 person was killed and another 2 were injured. Some damage was caused. | 1 | 2 |
| 8 | Philippines, Babuyan Islands | 6.1 | 15.0 | | | | |
| 9 | Chile, Magallanes Region | 6.0 | 15.0 | | | | |
| 10 | Iran, Bushehr province | 4.5 | 15.0 | | Major damage was caused. | | |
| 12 | Tonga | 6.0 | 17.7 | | | | |
| 14 | United Kingdom, Santa Cruz Islands, Solomon Islands | 7.4 | 101.8 | VII | | | |
| 29 | Japan, Izu Islands | 7.2 | 59.8 | X | Some damage was caused. | | |

=== March ===
March
- Strongest magnitude: 7.2 M_{w} Fiji
- Deadliest: 6.4 M_{w} Peru; 7 deaths
- Total fatalities: 7

Number by magnitude
- 8.0–8.9: 0
- 7.0–7.9: 1
- 6.0–6.9: 7

| Date | Country and location | M_{w} | Depth (km) | MMI | Notes | Casualties | |
| Date | Country and location | M_{w} | Depth (km) | MMI | Notes | Dead | Injured |
|---|---|---|---|---|---|---|---|
| 1 | Tonga | 6.0 | 10.0 | | | | |
| 7 | New Zealand, Kermadec Islands | 6.6 | 200.0 | | | | |
| 19 | Japan, off the east coast of Honshu | 6.2 | 71.3 | V | | | |
| 20 | Peru, San Martin Region | 6.4 | 55.0 | IX | 7 people were killed and 50 were injured. $20 million (1972 rate) in property damage was caused. | 7 | 50 |
| 22 | Soviet Union, Kuril Islands, Russia | 6.8 | 138.9 | | | | |
| 25 | Australia, Bismarck Sea, Papua New Guinea | 6.5 | 30.0 | | | | |
| 25 | Soviet Union, Kuril Islands, Russia | 6.3 | 45.4 | VI | | | |
| 30 | Fiji, south of | 7.2 | 495.8 | | | | |

=== April ===
April
- Strongest magnitude: 7.5 M_{w} Philippines
- Deadliest: 6.6 M_{w} Iran; 30,000 deaths
- Total fatalities: 30,004

Number by magnitude
- 8.0–8.9: 0
- 7.0–7.9: 3
- 6.0–6.9: 8

| Date | Country and location | M_{w} | Depth (km) | MMI | Notes | Casualties | |
| Date | Country and location | M_{w} | Depth (km) | MMI | Notes | Dead | Injured |
|---|---|---|---|---|---|---|---|
| 2 | Tonga | 6.0 | 25.0 | | | | |
| 2 | New Hebrides, Vanuatu | 6.7 | 10.0 | | | | |
| 4 | Indonesia, Barat Daya Islands | 6.8 | 390.0 | IV | | | |
| 10 | Iran, Fars province | 6.6 | 10.0 | X | Deadliest event of 1972. The 1972 Qir earthquake was one of the worst in the country's history. 30,000 people were killed and 1,700 were injured. Extensive property destruction was caused. | 30,000 | 1,700 |
| 17 | Taiwan, off the east coast | 6.3 | 41.6 | V | | | |
| 21 | Tonga | 6.0 | 85.0 | | | | |
| 24 | Taiwan, off the east coast | 7.0 | 22.2 | VII | 4 people were killed and 11 were injured in the 1972 Ruisui earthquake. Some damage was reported. | 4 | 11 |
| 25 | Philippines, Mindoro | 7.5 | 25.0 | VIII | Some damage was caused. | | |
| 27 | Philippines, off the north coast of Mindoro | 6.0 | 25.0 | VI | Aftershock. | | |
| 28 | Australia, west of Bougainville Island, Papua New Guinea | 7.2 | 409.9 | IV | | | |
| 30 | Philippines, off the north coast of Mindoro | 6.0 | 25.0 | VI | Aftershock. | | |

=== May ===
May
- Strongest magnitude: 7.1 M_{w} Tonga
- Total fatalities: 0

Number by magnitude
- 8.0–8.9: 0
- 7.0–7.9: 1
- 6.0–6.9: 5

| Date | Country and location | M_{w} | Depth (km) | MMI | Notes | Casualties | |
| Date | Country and location | M_{w} | Depth (km) | MMI | Notes | Dead | Injured |
|---|---|---|---|---|---|---|---|
| 4 | New Hebrides, Vanuatu | 6.9 | 51.0 | VII | | | |
| 4 | Greece, off the southwest coast of Crete | 6.3 | 35.0 | VI | | | |
| 5 | Australia, off the west coast of New Ireland (island), Papua New Guinea | 6.6 | 30.0 | VII | | | |
| 17 | Philippines, off the west coast of Mindoro | 6.2 | 26.4 | V | Aftershock of April 25 event. | | |
| 22 | Philippines, Luzon | 6.9 | 35.0 | VII | | | |
| 22 | Tonga | 7.1 | 222.1 | | | | |

=== June ===
June
- Strongest magnitude: 7.7 M_{w} Celebes Sea
- Deadliest: 6.3 M_{w} Afghanistan; 11 deaths
- Total fatalities: 11

Number by magnitude
- 8.0–8.9: 0
- 7.0–7.9: 1
- 6.0–6.9: 5

| Date | Country and location | M_{w} | Depth (km) | MMI | Notes | Casualties | |
| Date | Country and location | M_{w} | Depth (km) | MMI | Notes | Dead | Injured |
|---|---|---|---|---|---|---|---|
| 7 | Indonesia, off the north coast of Morotai | 6.0 | 150.0 | IV | | | |
| 8 | Chile, Coquimbo Region | 6.7 | 45.0 | VI | | | |
| 11 | Celebes Sea | 7.7 | 330.8 | V | | | |
| 12 | United States, Fox Islands (Alaska) | 6.2 | 32.5 | VI | | | |
| 21 | Japan, off the east coast of Kyushu | 6.0 | 39.9 | IV | | | |
| 24 | Afghanistan, Baghlan Province | 6.3 | 24.0 | VI | 11 people were killed and 15 were injured. Many homes were damaged or destroyed. | 11 | 15 |

=== July ===
July
- Strongest magnitude: 7.6 M_{w} United States
- Total fatalities: 0

Number by magnitude
- 8.0–8.9: 0
- 7.0–7.9: 1
- 6.0–6.9: 5
- 5.0–5.9: 1

| Date | Country and location | M_{w} | Depth (km) | MMI | Notes | Casualties | |
| Date | Country and location | M_{w} | Depth (km) | MMI | Notes | Dead | Injured |
|---|---|---|---|---|---|---|---|
| 2 | Iran, Fars province | 5.6 | 20.0 | VI | Some damage was caused. | | |
| 4 | Philippines, off the south coast of Negros, Philippines | 6.0 | 45.0 | V | | | |
| 23 | Canada, west of Vancouver Island | 6.5 | 15.0 | | | | |
| 29 | Indonesia, off the south coast of Minahassa Peninsula, Sulawesi | 6.2 | 139.1 | IV | | | |
| 30 | Australia, East New Britain Province, Papua New Guinea | 6.0 | 10.0 | rowspan="2"| Doublet earthquake. | | | |
| 30 | Australia, East New Britain Province, Papua New Guinea | 6.0 | 10.0 | VII | | | |
| 30 | United States, off the coast of southeast Alaska | 7.6 | 25.0 | VII | Some damage was caused. | | |

=== August ===
August
- Strongest magnitude: 7.5 M_{w} Australia, Papua New Guinea
- Total fatalities: 0

Number by magnitude
- 8.0–8.9: 0
- 7.0–7.9: 1
- 6.0–6.9: 10

| Date | Country and location | M_{w} | Depth (km) | MMI | Notes | Casualties | |
| Date | Country and location | M_{w} | Depth (km) | MMI | Notes | Dead | Injured |
|---|---|---|---|---|---|---|---|
| 1 | Indonesia, Molucca Sea | 6.3 | 97.7 | V | | | |
| 2 | Soviet Union, off the east coast of Kamchatka, Russia | 6.1 | 25.2 | | | | |
| 3 | United States, Andreanof Islands, Alaska | 6.4 | 33.5 | VI | | | |
| 4 | Soviet Union, Kuril Islands, Russia | 6.6 | 45.0 | | | | |
| 4 | United Kingdom, Solomon Islands | 6.1 | 15.0 | V | Beginning of a series of events. | | |
| 4 | United Kingdom, Solomon Islands | 6.1 | 15.0 | V | | | |
| 5 | United Kingdom, Solomon Islands | 6.0 | 15.0 | V | | | |
| 6 | United Kingdom, Solomon Islands | 6.3 | 15.0 | VI | | | |
| 17 | Australia, southeast of New Britain, Papua New Guinea | 7.5 | 20.0 | V | | | |
| 28 | Tonga | 6.1 | 10.0 | | | | |
| 30 | Australia, off the north coast of mainland Papua New Guinea | 6.5 | 15.0 | VI | | | |

=== September ===
September
- Strongest magnitude: 6.8 M_{w} Indonesia
- Deadliest: 6.2 M_{w} Pakistan; 100 deaths
- Total fatalities: 100

Number by magnitude
- 8.0–8.9: 0
- 7.0–7.9: 0
- 6.0–6.9: 19

| Date | Country and location | M_{w} | Depth (km) | MMI | Notes | Casualties | |
| Date | Country and location | M_{w} | Depth (km) | MMI | Notes | Dead | Injured |
|---|---|---|---|---|---|---|---|
| 1 | New Hebrides, Vanuatu | 6.0 | 122.3 | IV | | | |
| 3 | Australia, East New Britain Province, Papua New Guinea | 6.2 | 25.0 | VI | | | |
| 3 | Pakistan, Gilgit-Baltistan | 6.2 | 30.0 | VI | 100 deaths were caused. 1,000 homes were damaged or destroyed. | 100 | |
| 4 | Pakistan, Gilgit-Baltistan | 6.0 | 30.0 | VI | Aftershock. | | |
| 4 | United Kingdom, Santa Cruz Islands, Solomon Islands | 6.5 | 67.0 | | | | |
| 5 | Indonesia, off the south coast of Morotai | 6.3 | 126.3 | V | | | |
| 5 | New Hebrides, Vanuatu | 6.3 | 50.0 | | | | |
| 8 | Norway, west of Jan Mayen Island | 6.0 | 15.0 | | | | |
| 10 | France, Loyalty Islands, New Caledonia | 6.3 | 35.0 | | Doublet earthquake along with event from September 13. | | |
| 11 | Indonesia, off the east coast of Seram | 6.1 | 28.6 | VI | | | |
| 13 | Greece, Peloponnese (region) | 6.1 | 81.5 | VIII | Some damage was caused. | | |
| 13 | France, Loyalty Islands, New Caledonia | 6.4 | 30.0 | | Doublet earthquake along with event from September 10. | | |
| 16 | Mexico, off the coast of Oaxaca | 6.0 | 30.0 | IV | | | |
| 17 | Greece, off the west coast | 6.5 | 15.0 | VII | 40 homes were destroyed. | | |
| 19 | Dominican Republic, Duarte Province | 6.1 | 15.0 | VII | | | |
| 22 | Taiwan, off the east coast | 6.3 | 25.0 | rowspan="2"| Doublet earthquake. | | | |
| 23 | Taiwan, off the east coast | 6.4 | 25.0 | VI | | | |
| 24 | Indonesia, Tanimbar Islands | 6.8 | 35.0 | | | | |
| 26 | Argentina, San Juan Province, Argentina | 6.0 | 15.0 | VI | | | |

=== October ===
October
- Strongest magnitude: 6.7 M_{w} Mexico
- Total fatalities: 0

Number by magnitude
- 8.0–8.9: 0
- 7.0–7.9: 0
- 6.0–6.9: 6

| Date | Country and location | M_{w} | Depth (km) | MMI | Notes | Casualties | |
| Date | Country and location | M_{w} | Depth (km) | MMI | Notes | Dead | Injured |
|---|---|---|---|---|---|---|---|
| 6 | Australia, West New Britain Province, Papua New Guinea | 6.3 | 50.0 | VI | | | |
| 12 | Indonesia, off the west coast of Halmahera | 6.1 | 124.8 | IV | | | |
| 20 | Mexico, off the coast of Jalisco | 6.7 | 20.0 | | | | |
| 27 | New Hebrides, Vanuatu | 6.3 | 25.0 | | | | |
| 28 | Australia, Morobe Province, Papua New Guinea | 6.3 | 10.0 | VII | | | |
| 30 | Australia, off the west coast of Bougainville Island, Papua New Guinea | 6.3 | 53.2 | V | | | |

=== November ===
November
- Strongest magnitude: 7.0 M_{w} France, New Caledonia
- Total fatalities: 0

Number by magnitude
- 8.0–8.9: 0
- 7.0–7.9: 1
- 6.0–6.9: 6

| Date | Country and location | M_{w} | Depth (km) | MMI | Notes | Casualties | |
| Date | Country and location | M_{w} | Depth (km) | MMI | Notes | Dead | Injured |
|---|---|---|---|---|---|---|---|
| 2 | France, Loyalty Islands, New Caledonia | 7.0 | 20.0 | VII | | | |
| 4 | New Hebrides, Vanuatu | 6.4 | 20.0 | | Aftershock. | | |
| 4 | Indonesia, East Java | 6.0 | 70.0 | V | | | |
| 5 | Indonesia, Savu Sea | 6.1 | 35.0 | | | | |
| 9 | Taiwan, Hualien County | 6.1 | 22.9 | VI | | | |
| 12 | Soviet Union, Gorno-Badakhshan Autonomous Region, Tajikistan | 6.2 | 114.7 | V | | | |
| 13 | Mexico, off the coast of Oaxaca | 6.6 | 15.0 | V | | | |

=== December ===
December
- Strongest magnitude: 8.0 M_{w} Philippines
- Deadliest: 6.3 M_{w} Nicaragua; 10,000 deaths
- Total fatalities: 10,000

Number by magnitude
- 8.0–8.9: 1
- 7.0–7.9: 1
- 6.0–6.9: 5

| Date | Country and location | M_{w} | Depth (km) | MMI | Notes | Casualties | |
| Date | Country and location | M_{w} | Depth (km) | MMI | Notes | Dead | Injured |
|---|---|---|---|---|---|---|---|
| 2 | Philippines, off the east coast of Mindanao | 8.0 | 60.0 | VII | Largest event of 1972. Some damage was reported. | | |
| 4 | Japan, Izu Islands | 7.4 | 55.0 | X | Some damage was reported. | | |
| 4 | Indonesia, Biak | 6.0 | 15.0 | VI | | | |
| 7 | Indonesia, Papua (province) | 6.0 | 25.0 | VI | | | |
| 8 | Indonesia, Mentawai Islands | 6.1 | 28.9 | VI | | | |
| 23 | Nicaragua, Managua | 6.3 | 10.0 | IX | The 1972 Nicaragua earthquake caused major destruction to the capitol Managua. 10,000 people were killed and over 20,000 were injured. Costs were around $3 billion (1972 rate). | 10,000 | 20,000 |
| 29 | Chile, Coquimbo Region | 6.1 | 45.0 | VI | | | |
