= 1981 Sirch earthquake =

Earthquake in Iran

- Location within Iran
- UTC time: 1981-07-28 17:22:26
- ISC event: 624412
- USGS-ANSS: ComCat
- Local date: July 28, 1981
- Local time: 20:52:26 IRST
- Magnitude: 7.1 M_{s}
- Depth: 33 km (21 mi)
- Epicenter: 30.01°N 57.79°E
- Areas affected: Iran
- Max. intensity: MMI IX (Violent)
- Casualties: 1,500 dead 1,000 injured

The 1981 Sirch earthquake occurred at 20:52 local time (17:22 UTC) on July 28, just almost two months before the Golbaf earthquake, that occurred in June 11, measuring 6.6 or 6.7. It had a magnitude of 7.1 on the surface-wave magnitude scale and a maximum perceived intensity of IX (Violent) on the Mercalli intensity scale. The epicentre was in the province of Kerman in eastern Iran. The earthquake caused the destruction of Kerman and serious damage to towns and villages in the surrounding area. The estimated number of deaths is 1,500, with a further 1,000 injured, 50,000 homeless, and extensive damage in the Kerman Region.

The 2003 Bam earthquake was the most significant earthquake in the Kerman Province.

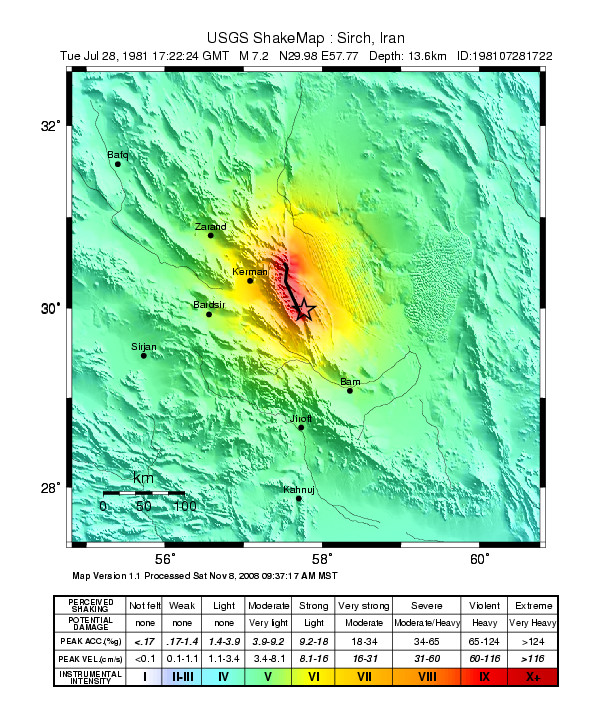
USGS Shakemap for the event

== See also ==
- 2003 Bam earthquake
- List of earthquakes in 1981
- List of earthquakes in Iran
