= Lists of earthquakes =

Earthquakes (6.0+ M_{w}) between 1900 and 2017

Earthquakes are caused by movements within the Earth's crust and uppermost mantle. They range from weak events detectable only by seismometers, to sudden and violent events lasting many minutes which have caused some of the biggest disasters in human history. Below, there are earthquakes listed by period, region or country, year, magnitude, cost, fatalities, and number of scientific studies.

== Deadliest earthquakes ==
The following is a summary list of earthquakes with over approximately 100,000 deaths. The 893 Ardabil earthquake is most likely the same as the 893 Dvin earthquake, due to misreading of the Arabic word for Dvin, "Dabil" as "Ardabil".

Event	Date	Location	Fatalities	Magnitude	Notes on fatalities
1976 Tangshan earthquake	July 27, 1976	(China) Hebei, China	300,000+	7.6	Internal Tangshan reports found 263,299 local deaths. Official nationwide deaths stated to be 242,769. Scholars estimated >300,000.
1920 Haiyuan earthquake	December 16, 1920	(Republic of China (1912–1949)) Ningxia–Gansu, China	273,400	7.8	Previously cited death toll was 230,000 and this figure was revised in 2010.
526 Antioch earthquake	May 21, 526	(Byzantine Empire) Antioch, Byzantine Empire (modern-day Turkey)	250,000	7.0	Procopius (II.14.6), sources based on John of Ephesus.
1139 Ganja earthquake	September 30, 1139	Ganja, Seljuk Empire (modern-day (Azerbaijan) Azerbaijan)	230,000–300,000	7.0 M_{w}	Death toll may have been a historical conflation with earthquakes on November 1137 in the Jazira plain and the 1138 Aleppo earthquake.
2004 Indian Ocean earthquake and tsunami	December 26, 2004	(Indonesia) Sumatra, Indonesia	227,898	9.2	Death toll includes those missing and presumed dead.
1303 Hongdong earthquake	July 25, 1303	Shanxi, Yuan dynasty (modern-day (China) China)	200,000	8.0	
856 Damghan earthquake	December 22, 856	Damghan, Abbasid Caliphate (modern-day (Iran) Iran)	200,000	7.9 M_{s}	
1138 Aleppo earthquake	October 11, 1138	Aleppo, Seljuk Empire (modern-day (Syria) Syria)	130,000–230,000	7.1	The figure of 230,000 dead is based on a historical conflation of this earthquake with earthquakes in November 1137 on the Jazira plain and the 1139 Ganja earthquake in the Azerbaijani city of Ganja. The first mention of a 230,000 death toll was by Ibn Taghribirdi in the fifteenth century.
1908 Messina earthquake	December 28, 1908	(Kingdom of Italy) Messina, Kingdom of Italy	120,000	7.1 M_{s}	The epicentre was in the Strait of Messina which separates Sicily from the Italian mainland, affecting also the city of Reggio Calabria.
1948 Ashgabat earthquake	October 5, 1948	(Turkmen Soviet Socialist Republic) Ashgabat, Turkmen SSR (modern-day Turkmenistan)	110,000	7.3 M_{s}	Previously cited death toll was 10,000 until a news release on December 9, 1988, advised that the correct death toll was 110,000.
1923 Great Kantō earthquake	September 1, 1923	(Empire of Japan) Kantō region, Japan	105,385	7.9	Casualty estimates range from 100,000 to 142,800, the latter figure including 40,000 missing later presumed dead.
1556 Shaanxi earthquake	January 23, 1556	Shaanxi, modern-day (China) China	100,000	8.0	Direct deaths thought to be just over 100,000 while about 730,000 people died from famines or migrated elsewhere.
2010 Haiti earthquake	January 12, 2010	(Haiti) Haiti	46,000–316,000	7.0	Estimates vary from 316,000 (Haitian government) to 222,570 (UN OCHA estimate) to 158,000 (Medicine, Conflict and Survival) to between 46,000 and 85,000 (report commissioned by USAID).
1290 Zhili earthquake	September 27, 1290	Ningcheng, Yuan dynasty (modern-day (China) China)	7,000–100,000	6.8 M_{s}	Estimates also suggests lower values of at least 7,000.

=== Deadliest earthquakes by year since 1920 ===
Date	Magnitude	Location	Depth (km)	MMI	Deaths	Notes
December 16, 1920	7.9	China, Ningxia	15.0	XII	258,707–273,407	
November 11, 1922	8.3–8.6	Chile, Atacama	35.0	XI	1,000	
September 1, 1923	7.9–8.2	Japan, Kanagawa Prefecture	23.0	XI	105,385	
November 12, 1924		Dutch East Indies, central Java		IX	727	
March 16, 1925	6.9–7.0	China, Yunnan	26.0	IX	5,000	
October 22, 1926	6.0	Turkey, Kars Province	7.0	IX	360	
May 22, 1927	7.7	China, Gansu	15.0	XI	40,912	
December 1, 1928	7.6	Chile, Maule Region	20.0	IX	279	
May 1, 1929	7.2	Turkmen Soviet Socialist Republic, Ahal Region	10.0	IX	3,257–3,800	
July 23, 1930	6.6	Italy, Irpinia	15.0	X	1,404	
August 10, 1931	8.0	China, Xinjiang Province	20.0	XI	10,000	
May 20, 1932	5.4	Persia, Mazandaran province	12.0	VIII	1,070	
August 25, 1933	7.3	China, Sichuan Province	15.0	X	6,865–9,300	
January 15, 1934	8.0	Nepal, Koshi	15.0	X	10,700–12,000	
May 30, 1935	7.7	British Raj, Khanate of Kalat	15.0	X	30,000–60,000	
April 1, 1936	6.8	China, Guangxi Province	7.0	IX	1,001	
July 31, 1937	6.9	China, Shandong Province	25.0	IX	3,252	
April 19, 1938	6.6	Turkey, Kırşehir Province	10.0	IX	224	
December 26, 1939	7.8	Turkey, Erzincan Province	20.0	XII	32,700–32,968	
November 10, 1940	7.7	Romania, Vrancea County	133.0	X	1,000	
January 11, 1941	5.8–6.5	Yemen, Razih District	35.0	VIII	1,200	
December 20, 1942	7.0	Turkey, Erbaa	10.0	IX	3,000	
November 26, 1943	7.5	Turkey, Çankırı	20.0	XI	2,824–5,000	
January 15, 1944	7.0	Argentina, San Juan	15.0	IX	10,000	
November 27, 1945	8.1	British Raj, Makran Coast	15.0	X	300–4,000	
August 4, 1946	7.8	Dominican Republic, Samaná	15.0	IX	2,550	
November 1, 1947	7.7	Peru, Junín Province	20.0	IX	233–2,233	
October 5, 1948	7.3	Soviet Union, Turkmen Soviet Socialist Republic	15.0	X	10,000–110,000	
July 10, 1949	7.5	Soviet Union, Tajik Soviet Socialist Republic	18.0	IX	7,200	
August 15, 1950	8.6	India, Assam	15.0	XI	4,800	
May 6, 1951	5.9–6.2	El Salvador, Usulután	85.0	VIII	400–1,100	
November 4, 1952	9.0	Soviet Union, Russian Soviet Socialist Republic	21.6	XI	2,336	
March 18, 1953	7.5	Turkey, Balıkesir Province	10.0	IX	1,070	
September 9, 1954	6.7	France, Chlef Province, Algeria	15.0	XI	1,243–1,409	
March 31, 1955	7.4	Philippines, Western Mindanao	35.0	VIII	465	
October 31, 1956	6.4	Iran, Hormozgan	15.0	VII	347	
December 13, 1957	6.5	Iran, Hamadan	15.0	VII	1,130	
August 16, 1958	6.7	Iran, Lorestan	15.0	VII	132	
August 18, 1959	7.3	United States, Montana	5.0	X	28	
February 29, 1960	5.8	Morocco, Souss-Massa	15.0	X	12,000–15,000	
June 11, 1961	6.4	Iran, Fars province	15.0	VIII	60	
September 1, 1962	7.1	Iran, Qazvin province	10.0	IX	12,225	
July 26, 1963	6.1	Yugoslavia, Macedonia	15.0	X	1,070	
March 28, 1964	9.2–9.3	United States, Alaska	25.0	XI	131	
March 28, 1965	7.4–7.6	Chile, Valparaíso Region	70.0	IX	400–500	
March 22, 1966	6.8	China, Hebei	20.0	IX	8,064	
July 30, 1967	6.6	Venezuela, Vargas	25.0	VIII	225–300	
August 31, 1968	7.1	Iran, South Khorasan province	10.0	X	15,900	
July 25, 1969	6.4	China, Guangdong	20.0	VIII	3,000	
May 31, 1970	7.9	Peru, Ancash	45.0	VIII	66,794–70,000	
May 22, 1971	6.6	Turkey, Bingöl	10.0	VIII	875	
April 10, 1972	6.7	Iran, Fars	10.0	IX	5,374	
February 6, 1973	7.6	China, Sichuan	11.0	X	2,175–2,204	
May 10, 1974	7.1	China, Yunnan	14.0	IX	1,641–20,000	
September 6, 1975	6.7	Turkey, Diyarbakır	26.0	IX	2,311	
July 27, 1976	7.6	China, Hebei	12.2	XI	242,469	
March 4, 1977	7.5	Romania, Vrancea	85.3	IX	1,700	
September 16, 1978	7.4	Iran, Yazd	33.0	IX	15,000–25,000	
December 12, 1979	8.2	Colombia, Nariño	33.0	IX	300–600	
October 10, 1980	7.1	Algeria, Chlef	10.0	X	2,633–5,000	
June 11, 1981	6.6	Iran, Kerman	33.0	VIII	3,000	
December 13, 1982	6.2	North Yemen, Dhamar	10.0	VIII	2,800	
October 30, 1983	6.6	Turkey, Erzurum	15.0	IX	1,340	
September 13, 1984	6.3	Japan, Nagano	2.0	VIII	14	
September 19, 1985	8.0	Mexico, Michoacán	20.0	IX	5,000–45,000	
October 10, 1986	5.7	El Salvador, San Salvador	10.0	IX	1,000–1,500	
March 6, 1987	7.1	Ecuador, Sucumbíos	10.0	IX	1,000–5,000	
December 7, 1988	6.8	Soviet Union, Armenian Soviet Socialist Republic	5.0	X	25,000–50,000	
January 22, 1989	5.3	Soviet Union, Tajik Soviet Socialist Republic	33.0	VII	274	
June 20, 1990	7.4	Iran, Gilan	18.5	X	35,000–40,000	
October 19, 1991	6.8	India, Uttarkashi	11.6	IX	768–2,000	
December 12, 1992	7.8	Indonesia, Flores Sea offshore	27.7	VIII	2,500	
September 29, 1993	6.2	India, Latur	10.0	VIII	9,748	
June 6, 1994	6.8	Colombia, Cauca	12.1	IX	1,100	
January 16, 1995	6.9	Japan, Kobe	21.9	XI	5,502–6,434	
February 3, 1996	6.6	China, Yunnan	10.0	X	309–322	
May 10, 1997	7.3	Iran, Khorasan	10.0	X	1,567	
May 30, 1998	6.5–6.6	Afghanistan, Takhar	33.0	VII	4,000–4,500	
August 17, 1999	7.6	Turkey, İzmit	17.0	X	17,127–18,373	
June 4, 2000	7.9	Indonesia, Enggano Island offshore	44.0	VI	103	
January 26, 2001	7.6	India, Bhuj	16.0	X	13,805–20,023	
March 25, 2002	6.1	Afghanistan, Baghlan Province	8.0	VII	1,200	
December 26, 2003	6.6	Iran, Bam	15.0	IX	34,000	
December 26, 2004	9.2–9.3	Indonesia, Sumatra offshore	30.0	IX	227,898	Most of these deaths were caused by the ensuing tsunami, not the quake itself.
March 28, 2005	8.6–8.7	Indonesia, Sumatra offshore	30.0	VIII	1,638–1,738	
October 8, 2005	7.6	Pakistan, Balakot	15.0	XI	86,000–87,351	
May 26, 2006	6.4	Indonesia, Yogyakarta	10.0	IX	5,749	
August 15, 2007	8.0	Peru, Ica offshore	39.0	IX	595	
May 12, 2008	7.9	China, Sichuan	19.0	XI	87,587	
September 30, 2009	7.6	Indonesia, Padang offshore	90.0	VII	1,115	
January 12, 2010	7.0	Haiti, Léogâne	13.0	X	46,000–160,000	
March 11, 2011	9.1	Japan, Sendai offshore	29.0	XI	19,759	The following tsunami led to about 18,500 deaths.
August 11, 2012	6.4	Iran, East Azerbaijan	9.0	VIII	306	
September 24, 2013	7.7	Pakistan, Balochistan	15.0	IX	825	
August 3, 2014	6.1	China, Yunnan	10.0	IX	617	
April 25, 2015	7.8	Nepal, Gorkha District	8.2	X	8,962	
April 16, 2016	7.8	Ecuador, Esmeraldas	20.6	VIII	676	
November 12, 2017	7.3	(Iran) (Iraq) Iran–Iraq border Region	19.0	IX	630	
September 28, 2018	7.5	Indonesia, Palu	20.0	X	4,340	
November 26, 2019	6.4	Albania, Durrës	10.0	VIII	51	
October 30, 2020	7.0	Greece; Turkey; Aegean Sea	21.0	VIII	119	
August 14, 2021	7.2	Haiti, Nippes	10.0	IX	2,248	
June 21, 2022	6.0	Afghanistan, Khost	10.0	VIII	1,052–1,163	
February 6, 2023	7.8 & 7.7	Turkey, Southeastern Anatolia (Ba'athist Syria) Syria, Aleppo and Idlib	10.0 & 7.4	XII	59,488–62,013	These were two earthquakes of magnitudes 7.8 and 7.7.
January 1, 2024	7.5	Japan, Ishikawa	10.0	X	761	
March 28, 2025	7.7	Myanmar, Sagaing Region; Thailand	10.0	X	5,456	
June 24, 2026	7.2 & 7.5	Venezuela, Yaracuy	21.3 & 10.0	IX	6,509–50,000	Two earthquakes of magnitudes 7.2 and 7.5.

== Strongest earthquakes by magnitude ==
A pie chart comparing the seismic moment release of the three strongest earthquakes for the hundred-year period from 1906 to 2005 with that for all earthquakes of magnitudes <6, 6 to 7, 7 to 8, and >8 for the same period. The 2011 Japan quake would be roughly similar to Sumatra.

Earthquakes of magnitude 8.0 and greater from 1900 to 2018. The apparent 3D volumes of the bubbles are linearly proportional to their respective fatalities. The colour indicates the continent, and the legend counts the number of quakes for each. Notice the absence of Africa.

For those which occurred before the development and deployment of seismographs – starting around 1900 – magnitudes are estimated from historical reports of the extent and severity of damage.

Rank	Date	Location	Event	Magnitude
1	May 22, 1960	Valdivia, Chile	1960 Valdivia earthquake	9.4–9.6
2	March 27, 1964	Prince William Sound, Alaska, United States	1964 Alaska earthquake	9.2–9.3
2	December 26, 2004	Sumatra, Indonesia	2004 Indian Ocean earthquake	9.2–9.3
4	March 11, 2011	Pacific Ocean, Tōhoku region, Japan	2011 Tōhoku earthquake	9.0–9.1
5	November 4, 1952	Kamchatka, Russian SFSR, Soviet Union	1952 Severo-Kurilsk earthquake	8.8–9.0
6	February 27, 2010	Maule, Chile	2010 Chile earthquake	8.8
6	July 30, 2025	Kamchatka, Russia	2025 Kamchatka earthquake	8.8
6	January 31, 1906	Esmeraldas, Ecuador – Colombia	1906 Ecuador–Colombia earthquake	8.5–8.8
9	February 3, 1965	Rat Islands, Alaska, United States	1965 Rat Islands earthquake	8.7
9	August 15, 1950	Assam, India – Tibet, China	1950 Assam–Tibet earthquake	8.7
11	April 1, 1946	Aleutian Islands, Alaska, United States	1946 Aleutian Islands earthquake	8.6
11	March 9, 1957	Andreanof Islands, Alaska, United States	1957 Andreanof Islands earthquake	8.6
11	March 28, 2005	Sumatra, Indonesia	2005 Nias–Simeulue earthquake	8.6
11	April 11, 2012	Sumatra, Indonesia	2012 Indian Ocean earthquakes	8.6
15	November 11, 1922	Atacama, Chile	1922 Vallenar earthquake	8.3–8.6
15	February 1, 1938	Banda Sea, Indonesia (then part of the Dutch East Indies)	1938 Banda Sea earthquake	8.5–8.6
17	March 2, 1933	Iwate Prefecture, Japan	1933 Sanriku earthquake	8.4–8.5
17	October 13, 1963	Kuril Islands, Russian SFSR, Soviet Union	1963 Kuril Islands earthquake	8.5
17	September 12, 2007	Bengkulu Province, Indonesia	2007 Bengkulu earthquakes	8.4–8.5

=== Pre-instrumental earthquakes ===
Date	Location	Event	Magnitude (est.)
July 8, 1730	(Spanish Empire) Valparaíso, Chile (then part of the Spanish Empire)	1730 Valparaíso earthquake	9.1–9.3
October 17, 1737	(Russian Empire) Kamchatka Peninsula, Russian Empire	1737 Kamchatka earthquake	9.0–9.3
December 16, 1575	(Spanish Empire) Valdivia, Chile (then part of the Spanish Empire)	1575 Valdivia earthquake	9.0
November 24, 1604	(Spanish Empire) Arica, Chile (then part of the Spanish Empire)	1604 Arica earthquake	9.0
May 17, 1841	(Russian Empire) Kamchatka, Russian Empire	1841 Kamchatka earthquake	9.0
November 17, 1837	(Chile) Valdivia, Chile	1837 Valdivia earthquake	8.8–9.5
August 31, 1420	(Chile) Pacific Ocean, Atacama region (now Atacama, Chile)	1420 Caldera earthquake	8.8–9.4
November 25, 1833	(Dutch East Indies) Sumatra, Indonesia (then part of the Dutch East Indies)	1833 Sumatra earthquake	8.8–9.2
August 13, 1868	(Peru) Arica, Peru (now part of present-day Chile)	1868 Arica earthquake	8.8–9.1
November 26, 1852	(Dutch East Indies) Banda Islands, Indonesia (then part of the Dutch East Indies)	1852 Banda Sea earthquake	8.8
October 28, 1707	(Japan) Pacific Ocean, Shikoku region, Japan	1707 Hōei earthquake	8.7–9.3
January 26, 1700	(Spanish Empire) Pacific Ocean, US, and Canada (then claimed by the Spanish Empire and the British Empire)	1700 Cascadia earthquake	8.7–9.2
May 9, 1877	(Peru) Iquique, Chile (then Peru)	1877 Iquique earthquake	8.7–8.9
October 20, 1687	(Spanish Empire) Lima, Peru (then part of the Spanish Empire)	1687 Peru earthquake	8.7
July 13, 869	(Japan) Pacific Ocean, Tōhoku region, Japan	869 Jōgan earthquake	8.6–9.0
October 28, 1746	(Spanish Empire) Lima, Peru (then part of the Spanish Empire)	1746 Lima–Callao earthquake	8.6–8.8
September 20, 1498	(Japan) Pacific Ocean, Chūbu region, Japan	1498 Meiō earthquake	8.6
March 28, 1787	(Spanish Empire) Oaxaca, Mexico (then part of the Spanish Empire)	1787 New Spain earthquake	8.6
February 2, 1816	(Kingdom of Portugal) Atlantic Ocean, Lisbon, Portugal	1816 North Atlantic earthquake	8.6
November 1, 1755	(Kingdom of Portugal) Atlantic Ocean, Lisbon, Portugal	1755 Lisbon earthquake	8.5–9.0
April 2, 1762	Chittagong, Bangladesh (then Kingdom of Mrauk U)	1762 Arakan earthquake	8.5–8.8
July 21, 365	(Greece) Mediterranean Sea, Crete, Greece	365 Crete earthquake	8.5
August 24, 1356	(Kingdom of Portugal) Atlantic Ocean, Lisbon, Portugal	1356 Lisbon earthquake	8.5
July 25, 1668	(Qing dynasty) Shandong, China	1668 Shandong earthquake	8.5
May 24, 1751	(Spanish Empire) Concepción, Chile (then part of the Spanish Empire)	1751 Concepción earthquake	8.5
March 31, 1761	(Kingdom of Portugal) Atlantic Ocean, Lisbon, Portugal	1761 Lisbon earthquake	8.5
April 4, 1819	(Chile) Copiapó, Chile	1819 Copiapó earthquake	8.5
November 19, 1822	(Chile) Valparaíso, Chile	1822 Valparaíso earthquake	8.5
February 20, 1835	(Chile) Concepción, Chile	1835 Concepción earthquake	8.5
February 8, 1843	Guadeloupe region, Lesser Antilles	1843 Guadeloupe earthquake	8.5
February 16, 1861	(Dutch East Indies) Sumatra, Indonesia (then part of the Dutch East Indies)	1861 Sumatra earthquake	8.5
June 15, 1896	(Empire of Japan) Pacific Ocean, Tōhoku region, Empire of Japan	1896 Sanriku earthquake	8.5
June 6, 1505	(Nepal) Himalayas, northern Nepal	1505 Lo Mustang earthquake	8.2–8.8

=== Strongest earthquakes by magnitude each year since 1907 ===
Year	Date	Magnitude	Location	Depth (km)	MMI	Deaths	Injuries
1907	January 4, 1907	8.2	Dutch East Indies, Sumatra	25.0	IV-V	2,188	-
1908	March 26, 1908	7.5	Mexico, Guerrero	25.0	–	-	-
1909	July 7, 1909	7.7	Afghanistan, Badakhshan	200.0	–	-	-
1910	April 12, 1910	8.1	(Japan) Sakishima Islands-Taiwan region	235.0	–	60	-
1911	June 15, 1911	7.9	Japan, Ryukyu Islands	150.0	IX	-	-
1912	May 23, 1912	7.9	Myanmar, Shan	15.0	IX	-	-
1913	March 14, 1913	7.9	Philippines, Mindanao	15.0	IX	138	-
1914	May 26, 1914	8.2	Dutch East Indies, Papua	15.0	-	100+	-
1915	May 1, 1915	7.8	Russian Empire, Kuril Islands	30.0	-	–	-
1916	January 1, 1916	8.0	Territory of New Guinea, East New Britain	35.0	-	–	-
1917	May 1, 1917	8.2	New Zealand, Kermadec Islands	15.0	-	–	-
1918	August 15, 1918	8.3	Philippines, Mindanao	20.0	-	52	-
1919	April 30, 1919	8.1	Tonga	25.0	-	–	-
1920	June 5, 1920	8.2	Taiwan, Hualien	20.0	VII	–	-
1921	November 15, 1921	7.8	Afghanistan, Badakhshan	240.0	V	–	-
1922	November 11, 1922	8.3–8.6	Chile, Atacama	70.0	-	500	-
1923	February 3, 1923	8.4	Soviet Union, Kamchatka Krai	15.0	-	3	-
1924	April 10, 1924	8.1	Philippines, Mindanao	15.0	-	500	-
1925	November 10, 1925	7.3	Dutch East Indies, Papua	15.0	-	-	-
1926	October 26, 1926	7.6	Dutch East Indies, Papua	35.0	-	-	-
1927	May 22, 1927	7.7	Republic of China, Gansu	15.0	-	40,900	-
1928	June 17, 1928	8.0	Mexico, Oaxaca	15.0	-	4	-
1929	June 26, 1929	8.1	United Kingdom, South Sandwich Islands region	15.0	-	-	-
1930	December 3, 1930	7.5	British Burma, Bago	10.0	IX	30	-
1931	June 3, 1931	7.9	China, Xinjiang	10.0	X	10,000	-
1932	June 3, 1932	8.1	Mexico, Jalisco	35.0	X	400	-
1933	March 2, 1933	8.4–8.5	Japan, Sanriku coast	15.0	V	3,000	-
1934	January 15, 1934	8.0	Nepal, Sagarmatha Zone	15.0	X	10,700	-
1935	September 20, 1935	7.8	New Guinea, Sandaun Province	35.0	VII	0	0
1936	April 1, 1936	7.8	Dutch East Indies, Talaud Islands	35.0	IX	0	0
1937	January 7, 1937	7.8	China, Qinghai	15.0	VIII	0	0
1938	February 1, 1938	8.5–8.6	Dutch East Indies, Maluku offshore	60.0	VII	0	0
1939	December 21, 1939	8.1	Dutch East Indies, Central Sulawesi offshore	150.0	VII	0	0
1940	May 24, 1940	8.2	Peru, Lima	45.0	VIII	179–300	3,500
1941	November 18, 1941	8.0	Japan, Miyazaki offshore	35.0	VII	2	0
1942	August 24, 1942	8.2	Peru, Ica	35.0	IX	30	25
1943	April 6, 1943	8.1	Chile, Coquimbo	35.0	VIII	11	0
1944	December 7, 1944	8.1	Japan, Wakayama offshore	30.0	VIII	1,223	2,135
1945	November 27, 1945	8.1	India, Balochistan offshore	15.0	X	4,000	0
1946	April 1, 1946	8.6	United States, Alaska offshore	15.0	VI	173	0
1947	May 27, 1947	7.6	Dutch East Indies, Papua offshore	15.0	VI	0	0
1947	November 1, 1947	7.6	Peru, Junin	20.0	IX	233	0
1948	January 24, 1948	7.8	Philippines, Panay	15.0	X	50	0
1949	August 22, 1949	8.0	Canada, Haida Gwaii	10.0	VIII	0	0
1950	August 15, 1950	8.6	India–China, Assam–Tibet border region	15.0	XI	4,800	0
1951	November 24, 1951	7.8	Taiwan, East Rift Valley	30.0	VII	85	1,200
1952	November 4, 1952	9.0	Soviet Union, Kamchatka	21.6	XI	2,336	0
1953	November 25, 1953	7.9	Japan, Yokohama	25.0	V	1	0
1954	March 29, 1954	7.8	Spain, Andalusia	626.2	IV	0	0
1955	February 27, 1955	7.5	New Zealand, Kermadec Islands	15.0	I	0	0
1956	July 9, 1956	7.7	Greece, Dodecanese Islands	20.0	IX	56	0
1957	March 9, 1957	8.6	United States, Aleutian Islands, Alaska	25.0	VIII	2	0
1958	November 6, 1958	8.3	Soviet Union, Kuril Islands	35.0	X	0	51
1959	May 4, 1959	7.9	Soviet Union, Kamchatka	55.0	VIII	1	13
1960	May 22, 1960	9.5	Chile, Valdivia	25.0	XII	2,000	4,000
1961	August 19, 1961	7.6	Peru, Madre de Dios Region	612.2	IV	0	0
1962	May 21, 1962	7.5	Fiji offshore	390.0	I	0	0
1963	October 13, 1963	8.5	Soviet Union, Kuril Islands	35.0	IX	0	0
1964	March 27, 1964	9.2–9.3	United States, Alaska, Prince William Sound	25.0	XI	131	0
1965	February 3, 1965	8.7	United States, Alaska, Aleutian Islands	30.3	VI	0	0
1966	October 17, 1966	8.1	Peru, Arequipa	38.0	IX	125	3,000
1967	July 22, 1967	7.3	Turkey, Sakarya Province	30.0	X	86	0
1968	May 16, 1968	8.3	Japan, Hokkaidō	26.0	VIII	52	330
1969	August 11, 1969	8.2	Soviet Union, Kuril Islands	30.0	VIII	0	0
1970	July 31, 1970	8.0	Colombia, Amazonas Department	644.8	IV	1	4
1971	July 26, 1971	8.0	Papua New Guinea, Kokopo	37.0	IX	3	5
1972	December 12, 1972	8.0	Philippines, Mindanao	60.0	VII	0	0
1973	June 17, 1973	7.8	Japan, Hokkaidō	43.3	VIII	0	27
1974	October 3, 1974	8.1	Peru, Lima	13.0	IX	78	2,400
1975	May 26, 1975	7.8	north Atlantic Ocean	33.0	VI	0	0
1976	August 17, 1976	8.0	Philippines, Moro Gulf	33.0	VIII	8,000	10,000
1977	August 19, 1977	8.3	Indonesia, Bima	25.0	VI	189	1,100
1978	June 12, 1978	7.6	Japan, Miyagi	44.0	VIII	28	1,325
1979	December 12, 1979	8.1	Colombia, Nariño offshore Ecuador, Esmeraldas offshore	24.0	IX	600	0
1980	July 17, 1980	7.7	Solomon Islands, Santa Cruz Islands	33.0	VI	0	0
1981	September 1, 1981	7.5	New Zealand, offshore	25.0	IV	0	0
1982	June 19, 1982	7.3	El Salvador, offshore	73.0	VII	43	0
1983	March 18, 1983	7.7	Papua New Guinea, New Ireland	70.0	VII	0	0
1983	May 26, 1983	7.7	Japan, off the coast of Honshu	15.1	VIII	104	324
1984	February 7, 1984	7.5	Solomon Islands, Honiara	18.1	VIII	0	0
1985	September 19, 1985	8.0	Mexico, Mexico City	27.9	IX	5,000-45,000	40,000
1986	May 7, 1986	8.0	United States, Aleutian Islands, Alaska	19.0	VII	0	0
1987	November 30, 1987	7.8	United States, Gulf of Alaska	10.0	VI	0	0
1988	March 6, 1988	7.7	United States, Gulf of Alaska	15.0	V	0	0
1989	May 23, 1989	8.0	Australia, Macquarie Island	10.0	V	0	0
1990	April 18, 1990	7.8	Indonesia, Sulawesi	25.7	VII	5	36
1991	April 22, 1991	7.7	Costa Rica, Limón	10.0	IX	127	759
1992	December 12, 1992	7.8	Indonesia, Sunda Islands	23.5	VIII	2,500	0
1993	August 8, 1993	7.8	Guam, Offshore	59.3	IX	0	71
1994	October 5, 1994	8.3	Russia, Kuril Islands	3.0	IX	12	1,742
1995	October 9, 1995	8.1	Mexico, Colima	33.0	VIII	49	100
1995	July 30, 1995	8.1	Chile, Antofagasta	40.0	VII	3	58
1996	February 17, 1996	8.2	Indonesia, Biak	11.5	VIII	166	423
1997	December 5, 1997	7.8	Russia, Kamchatka Peninsula	23.5	VIII	0	0
1998	March 25, 1998	8.1	Antarctica, Balleny Islands	10.0		0	0
1999	September 21, 1999	7.6	Taiwan, Nantou County	15.5	IX	2,444	11,305
2000	November 16, 2000	8.0	Papua New Guinea, New Ireland	13.0	VII	2	0
2001	June 23, 2001	8.4	Peru, Arequipa	33.0	VIII	145	2,713
2002	November 3, 2002	7.9	United States, Alaska	4.2	IX	0	1
2003	September 26, 2003	8.3	Japan, Hokkaidō	23.5	IX	0	849
2004	December 26, 2004	9.3	Indonesia, Sumatra	10.0	IX	227,898	125,000
2005	March 28, 2005	8.6	Indonesia, Simeulue	21.0	IX	1313	300
2006	November 15, 2006	8.3	Russia, Kuril Islands	10.0	VI	0	1
2007	September 12, 2007	8.4–8.5	Indonesia, Sumatra	34.0	VIII	23	0
2008	May 12, 2008	7.9	China, Sichuan	19.0	XI	87,587	374,177
2009	September 29, 2009	8.1	Samoa, Offshore	18.0	VII	189	7
2010	February 27, 2010	8.8	Chile, Concepción	22.9	IX	550	12,000
2011	March 11, 2011	9.0–9.1	Japan, Honshu	29.0	IX	19,747	6,000
2012	April 11, 2012	8.6	Indonesia, Indian Ocean	20.0	VII	10	12
2013	May 24, 2013	8.3	Russia, Sea of Okhotsk	598.1	VI	0	0
2014	April 1, 2014	8.2	Chile, Iquique	25.0	VIII	6	9
2015	September 16, 2015	8.3	Chile, Coquimbo	22.4	IX	21	34
2016	December 17, 2016	7.9	Papua New Guinea, New Ireland	94.5	VII	0	0
2017	September 7, 2017	8.2	Mexico, Chiapas	47.4	IX	98	250
2018	August 19, 2018	8.2	Fiji, offshore	600.0	V	0	0
2019	May 26, 2019	8.0	Peru, Loreto	122.6	VIII	2	30
2020	July 22, 2020	7.8	United States, Alaska Peninsula offshore	28.0	VII	0	0
2021	July 28, 2021	8.2	United States, Alaska Peninsula offshore	32.2	VII	0	0
2022	September 11, 2022	7.6	Papua New Guinea, Morobe	116.0	VIII	21	42
2022	September 19, 2022	7.6	Mexico, Michoacán	26.9	VIII	2	35
2023	February 6, 2023	7.8	Turkey, Southeastern Anatolia	10.0	XII	59,488–62,013	121,704
2024	January 1, 2024	7.5	Japan, Ishikawa	10.0	X	761	1,410
2025	July 30, 2025	8.8	Russia, Kamchatka Peninsula	35.0	IX	1	25

=== Strongest earthquakes by magnitude by country/territory ===
- This list is a work in progress. Information is likely to be changed.
- The list refers to current country boundaries rather than those at the date of the earthquake.
- Please note, multiple countries could have the same earthquake listed, such as the 1906 Ecuador–Colombia earthquake being listed for both Ecuador and Colombia.
- Unless otherwise noted, magnitudes are reported on the Moment magnitude scale (M_{w}).

Country/Territory	Magnitude	Date	More information
Afghanistan	7.8	November 15, 1921	
Albania	6.7	November 30, 1967	
Algeria	7.1	October 10, 1980	1980 El Asnam earthquake
American Samoa	6.4	October 11, 1944	
Andorra	6.7 M_{e}	February 2, 1428	1428 Catalonia earthquake
Angola	6.0	May 24, 1914	
Anguilla	6.3	February 16, 1906	
Antarctica	8.1	March 25, 1998	1998 Balleny Islands earthquake
Antigua and Barbuda	8.0 M_{s}	April 16, 1690	
Argentina	7.5	November 23, 1977	1977 San Juan earthquake
Armenia	6.8 M_{s}	December 7, 1988	1988 Armenian earthquake
Aruba	4.7	August 27, 2011	
Australia	8.0	May 23, 1989	
Austria	5.6–6.5	September 15, 1590	1590 Neulengbach earthquake
Azerbaijan	7.0–7.3	September 30, 1139	1139 Ganja earthquake
Bahamas	3.2	February 22, 1992	
Bangladesh	8.5–8.8	April 2, 1762	1762 Arakan earthquake
Barbados	6.5	February 18, 2014 & July 16, 2015	
Belgium	6.0–6.5 M_{s}	September 18, 1692	1692 Northwestern Europe earthquake
Belize	4.7 mb	June 28, 1985	
Benin	5.6	1788	
Bermuda	5.3	August 27, 1988	
Bhutan	7.6–8.6	May 4, 1714	1714 Bhutan earthquake
Bolivia	8.2	June 9, 1994	1994 Bolivia earthquake
Bosnia and Herzegovina	6.1	October 26, 1969	1969 Banja Luka earthquake
Botswana	6.7 M_{L}	October 11, 1952	
Brazil	7.6	November 9, 1963	
British Indian Ocean Territory	7.3	November 30, 1983	1983 Chagos Archipelago earthquake
British Virgin Islands	5.9	June 26, 1985	
Brunei	5.2 mb	February 22, 1992	
Bulgaria	7.2	March 31, 1901 & April 4, 1904	1901 Black Sea earthquake & 1904 Kresna earthquakes
Burundi	5.4	October 30, 1966	
Cameroon	5.9	September 12, 1945	
Canada	8.7–9.2	January 26, 1700	1700 Cascadia earthquake
Cape Verde	6.5	August 15, 1941	
Caribbean Netherlands	5.2	March 10, 2017	
Cayman Islands	7.7	January 28, 2020	2020 Caribbean earthquake
Central African Republic	4.9 mb	February 6, 1994	
Chad	4.4	May 29, 2025	
Chile	9.4–9.6	May 22, 1960	1960 Valdivia earthquake
China	8.6	August 15, 1950	1950 Assam–Tibet earthquake
Christmas Island	6.9	July 24, 1979	
Cocos (Keeling) Islands	7.9	June 18, 2000	
Colombia	8.5–8.8	January 31, 1906	1906 Ecuador–Colombia earthquake
Comoros	6.2	August 23, 1918	
Congo	5.2	April 26, 1998	
Costa Rica	7.7	April 22, 1991	1991 Limon earthquake
Croatia	6.7	July 2, 1898	1898 Trilj earthquake
Cuba	7.1	February 20, 1917	
Curaçao	4.4	October 31, 2024	
Cyprus	7.0–7.5	May 11, 1222	1222 Cyprus earthquake
Czech Republic	4.8 M_{L}	December 23, 1985	
Democratic Republic of the Congo	6.9	December 13, 1910	
Denmark	4.4 mb	February 19, 2010	
Djibouti	6.5	August 20, 1989	
Dominica	6.4	January 8, 1959	
Dominican Republic	7.8	August 4, 1946	1946 Dominican Republic earthquake
East Timor	7.2	September 29, 1905	
Ecuador	8.5–8.8	January 31, 1906	1906 Ecuador–Colombia earthquake
Egypt	7.3	November 22, 1995	1995 Gulf of Aqaba earthquake
El Salvador	8.0 M_{I}	December 19, 1862	
Equatorial Guinea	4.9 mb	March 28, 1999	
Eritrea	6.6	December 28, 1977	
Estonia	4.5–4.7 mb	October 25, 1976	Osmussaar earthquake
Eswatini	4.4 mb	August 4, 1987	
Ethiopia	6.5	August 25, 1906	
Falkland Islands	7.4	August 17, 1908	
Faroe Islands	3.2	February 21, 2007	
Fiji	8.2	August 19, 2018	2018 Fiji earthquakes
Finland	4.7 M_{uk}	November 4, 1898	
France	6.4–6.5 M_{uk}	January 25, 1799	1799 Vendée earthquake
French Guiana	6.9	August 4, 1885	
French Polynesia	5.6	March 6, 1965	
Gabon	6.0	September 23, 1974	
(Georgia (country)) Georgia	7.0	April 29, 1991	1991 Racha earthquake
Germany	6.4 M_{L}	February 18, 1756	1756 Düren earthquake
Ghana	6.8	July 10, 1862	
Greece	8.5+	July 21, 365	365 Crete earthquake
Greenland	7.4	November 20, 1933	1933 Baffin Bay earthquake
Grenada	7.0 M_{s}	December 3, 1831	
Guadeloupe	8.5 M_{uk}	February 8, 1843	1843 Guadeloupe earthquake
Guam	7.8	August 8, 1993	1993 Guam earthquake
Guatemala	7.7	August 6, 1942	1942 Guatemala earthquake
Guinea	6.3	December 22, 1983	1983 Guinea earthquake
Guyana	5.5	January 31, 2021	
Haiti	8.1 M_{s}	May 7, 1842	1842 Cap-Haïtien earthquake
Honduras	7.6	February 8, 2025	
Hong Kong	3.8 M_{L}	January 5, 2020	
Hungary	6.2–6.5	June 28, 1763	1763 Komárom earthquake
Iceland	7.0	January 22, 1910	
India	9.2–9.3	December 26, 2004	2004 Indian Ocean earthquake and tsunami
Indonesia	9.2–9.3	December 26, 2004	2004 Indian Ocean earthquake and tsunami
Iran	7.9 M_{s}	December 22, 856	856 Damghan earthquake
Iraq	7.0	September 22, 1666	
Ireland	4.0 M_{L}	June 6, 2012	
Israel	7.3	December 5, 1033	1033 Jordan Valley earthquake
Italy	7.4	January 11, 1693	1693 Sicily earthquake
Jamaica	7.7	January 28, 2020	2020 Caribbean earthquake
Japan	9.0–9.1	March 11, 2011	2011 Tōhoku earthquake and tsunami
Jersey	5.4	July 30, 1926	
Jordan	7.3	December 5, 1033	1033 Jordan Valley earthquake
Kazakhstan	8.0	July 11, 1889 & January 3, 1911	1889 Chilik earthquake & 1911 Kebin earthquake
Kenya	6.7	January 6, 1928	
Kiribati	5.9 mb	May 23, 1982	
Kosovo	6.1 M_{L}	February 26, 1755 & August 10, 1921	
Kuwait	4.7 mb	June 2, 1993 & November 11, 2020	
Kyrgyzstan	8.0	July 11, 1889 & January 3, 1911	1889 Chilik earthquake & 1911 Kebin earthquake
Latvia	2.5	May 13, 2005	
Laos	6.7	December 22, 1925	
Lebanon	7.5	July 9, 551	551 Beirut earthquake
Lesotho	4.5	August 18, 2016	
Liberia	4.5 mb	November 25, 1995	
Libya	6.8	April 19, 1935	
Liechtenstein	3.6	December 12, 2013	
Lithuania	2.0	May 28, 1995	
Luxembourg	2.9 M_{L}	September 3, 1986	
Madagascar	6.2	July 4, 1919	
Malawi	6.3	March 10, 1989	1989 Malawi earthquake
Malaysia	7.1	February 22, 2026	
Maldives	7.4	February 29, 1944	
Mali	4.2 mb	January 11, 1999	
Malta	5.5	April 21, 2023	
Marshall Islands	5.7	March 22, 1982	
Martinique	7.5–8.0	January 11, 1839	1839 Martinique earthquake
Mauritania	4.6 mb	September 3, 1993 & March 1, 2012	
Mauritius	6.4	June 19, 1976	
Mayotte	5.9	May 15, 2018	
Mexico	8.6	March 28, 1787	1787 New Spain earthquake
Federated States of Micronesia	7.8	August 16, 1911	
Moldova	3.9 mb	April 2, 1988	
Monaco	6.3	July 19, 1963	
Mongolia	8.3	July 23, 1905	1905 Tsetserleg–Bulnay earthquakes
Montenegro	6.9	April 15, 1979	1979 Montenegro earthquake
Morocco	6.8	November 27, 1755 & September 8, 2023	1755 Meknes earthquake & 2023 Al Haouz earthquake
Mozambique	7.0	February 22, 2006	2006 Mozambique earthquake
Myanmar	8.5–8.8	April 2, 1762	1762 Arakan earthquake
Namibia	5.4	April 4, 2021	
Nepal	8.2–8.8	June 6, 1505	1505 Lo Mustang earthquake
Netherlands	5.3	April 13, 1992	1992 Roermond earthquake
New Caledonia	7.9	August 9, 1901	
New Zealand	8.2	January 23, 1855 & May 1, 1917	1855 Wairarapa earthquake
Nicaragua	7.7	September 2, 1992	1992 Nicaragua earthquake
Niger	4.6 mb	January 18, 2017	
Nigeria	4.5 mb	March 7, 2000	
North Korea	7.7	September 29, 1973	
North Macedonia	6.7	March 8, 1931	
Northern Mariana Islands	7.7	December 28, 1940 & July 29, 2016	
Norway	6.8	August 30, 2012	
Oman	5.7	March 30, 1966	
British Raj	8.1	November 27, 1945	1945 Balochistan earthquake
Palau	6.5	May 31, 1982	
Palestine	7.3	December 5, 1033	1033 Jordan Valley earthquake
Panama	7.9–8.3 M_{s}	September 7, 1882	1882 Panama earthquake
Papua New Guinea	8.2	May 6, 1919	
Paraguay	6.5	February 28, 1989	
Peru	8.5–9.3	August 13, 1868	1868 Arica earthquake
Philippines	8.3	August 15, 1918	1918 Celebes Sea earthquake
Poland	5.6	December 3, 1786	
Portugal	8.5–9.0	November 1, 1755	1755 Lisbon earthquake
Puerto Rico	8.0	May 2, 1787	1787 Boricua earthquake
Réunion	5.3 mb	April 5, 2007	
Romania	7.9	October 26, 1802	1802 Vrancea earthquake
Russia	9.0–9.3	October 16, 1737	1737 Kamchatka earthquake
Rwanda	5.9	February 3, 2008	2008 Lake Kivu earthquake
Saint Barthélemy	5.4	November 18, 1990	
Saint Kitts and Nevis	6.5	March 16, 1985	
Saint Lucia	7.3	March 19, 1953	
Saint Martin	5.0	July 4, 2012	
Saint Pierre and Miquelon	7.2	November 18, 1929	1929 Grand Banks earthquake
Saint Vincent and the Grenadines	6.1	July 6, 1940	
Samoa	8.3–8.5	June 26, 1917	1917 Samoa earthquake
São Tomé and Príncipe	5.5	December 19, 2019	
Saudi Arabia	7.3	November 22, 1995	1995 Gulf of Aqaba earthquake
Senegal	5.5	May 21, 1986	
Serbia	6.0	May 15, 1927	
Seychelles	5.2 mb	April 28, 1995	
Slovakia	6.2–6.5	June 28, 1763	1763 Komárom earthquake
Slovenia	6.1 M_{L}	April 14, 1895	1895 Ljubljana earthquake
Solomon Islands	8.1	April 1, 2007	2007 Solomon Islands earthquake
Somalia	6.0	January 22, 1929	
South Africa	6.8	December 31, 1932	
South Georgia and the South Sandwich Islands	8.1–8.3	August 12, 2021	2021 South Sandwich Islands earthquakes
South Korea	7.5	June 26, 1681	1681 Yangyang earthquake
South Sudan	7.2	May 20, 1990	1990 South Sudan earthquakes
Spain	7.8	March 29, 1954	
Sri Lanka	5.7	August 30, 1973	
Sudan	6.0	May 12, 1938	
Sweden	5.4	October 23, 1904	
Switzerland	6.0–7.1	October 18, 1356	1356 Basel earthquake
Syria	7.6 M_{s}	May 20, 1202	1202 Syria earthquake
Taiwan	8.2	June 5, 1920	1920 Hualien earthquake
Tajikistan	7.5	July 10, 1949	1949 Khait earthquake
Tanzania	7.0	July 8, 1919	
Thailand	6.1	May 5, 2014	2014 Mae Lao earthquake
Togo	5.6	1788	
Tonga	8.3–8.5	June 26, 1917	1917 Samoa earthquake
Trinidad and Tobago	7.5 M_{fa}	January 10, 1888	
Tunisia	7.2 or less	October 9, 859	
Turkey	7.8–8.0 M_{s}	August 17, 1668	1668 North Anatolia earthquake
Turkmenistan	8.2 M_{s}	July 7, 1895	
Tuvalu	5.4	February 5, 1983	
Uganda	6.5	June 30, 1952	
Ukraine	6.7	September 11, 1927	1927 Crimean earthquakes
United Arab Emirates	5.0	March 11, 2002	
United Kingdom	6.1 M_{L}	June 7, 1931	1931 Dogger Bank earthquake
United States	9.2–9.3	March 28, 1964	1964 Alaska earthquake
U.S. Virgin Islands	7.2	November 18, 1867	1867 Virgin Islands earthquake and tsunami
Uruguay	5.5 M_{s}	June 5, 1888	1888 Río de la Plata earthquake
Uzbekistan	7.4 M_{s}	October 21, 1907	1907 Qaratog earthquake
Vanuatu	8.1	September 20, 1920	
Venezuela	7.6–7.7	April 29, 1894 & October 29, 1900	1894 Venezuelan earthquake & 1900 San Narciso earthquake
Vietnam	6.8	November 1, 1935	
Wallis and Futuna	7.6	May 23, 1956	
Yemen	6.7	December 18, 1908	
Zambia	6.5	May 1, 1919	
Zimbabwe	5.5	September 25, 1963	

== Earthquakes with the most property damage ==
This is the top ten major earthquakes by the US dollar value of property (public and private) losses directly attributable to the earthquake, when unadjusted for inflation.

Rank	Event	Location	Magnitude	Property damage
1	2011 Tōhoku earthquake and tsunami	Japan	9.0–9.1	$360 billion
2	1995 Hanshin earthquake	Japan	6.9	$200 billion
3	2023 Turkey–Syria earthquakes	Turkey (Ba'athist Syria) Syria	7.8 & 7.7	$163.3 billion
4	2008 Sichuan earthquake	China	7.9–8.3	$130 billion
5	1994 Northridge earthquake	(United States)	6.7	$40 billion
6	2004 Chūetsu earthquake	Japan	6.6	$40 billion
7	2026 Venezuela earthquakes	(Venezuela) Venezuela	7.2 & 7.5	$37 billion
8	2010 Canterbury & February 2011 Christchurch earthquakes	(New Zealand) New Zealand	7.0 & 6.1–6.2	$27.9 billion
9	2016 Kumamoto earthquakes	(Japan) Japan	7.0	$24–46 billion
10	2011 Sikkim earthquake	India	6.9	$22 billion

== Most studied earthquakes ==
The 50 most studied earthquakes according to the International Seismological Centre (ISC), based on a count of scientific papers (mostly in English) that discuss that earthquake. The "Event #" is linked to the ISC Event Bibliography for that event.

Rank	Event origin time	ISC Event #	Papers	ISC code	Event
1	2011-03-11 05:46:23	16461282	2069	TOHOKU2011	2011 Tōhoku earthquake and tsunami
2	2008-05-12 06:28:00	13228121	1706	WENCHUAN2008	2008 Sichuan earthquake
3	2004-12-26 00:58:52	7453151	967	SUMATRA2004	2004 Indian Ocean earthquake and tsunami
4	1999-09-20 17:47:16	1718616	771	CHI-CHI1999	1999 Jiji earthquake
5	1995-01-16 20:46:51	124708	558	SHYOGO1995	1995 Hanshin earthquake
6	2010-02-27 06:34:13	14340585	551	MAULE2010	2010 Chile earthquake
7	1994-01-17 12:30:54	189275	548	NORTHRIDGE1994	1994 Northridge earthquake
8	2009-04-06 01:32:42	13438018	525	LAQUILA2009	2009 L'Aquila earthquake
9	1989-10-18 00:04:14	389808	520	LOMAPRIETA1989	1989 Loma Prieta earthquake
10	2015-04-25 06:11:26	607208674	516	GORKHA2015	2015 Nepal earthquake
11	1992-06-28 11:57:35	289086	440	LANDERS1992	1992 Landers earthquake
12	1999-08-17 00:01:38	1655218	428	IZMIT1999	1999 İzmit earthquake
13	2016-04-15 16:25:06	610289055	366	KUMAMOTO2016	2016 Kumamoto earthquakes
14	2013-04-20 00:02:47	607304721	342	LUSHAN2013	2013 Lushan earthquake
15	1964-03-28 03:36:13	869809	333	ALASKA1964	1964 Alaska earthquake
16	1960-05-22 19:11:20	879136	290	VALDIVIA1960	1960 Valdivia earthquake
17	2023-02-06 01:17:34	625613033	277	TURKYIE-SYRIA2023	2023 Turkey–Syria earthquakes
18	2016-08-24 01:36:33	611462212	259	AMATRICE2016	2016 Central Italy earthquake
19	2010-09-03 16:35:46	15155483	257	DARFIELD2010	2010 Canterbury earthquake
20	2001-01-26 03:16:40	1763683	256	BHUJ2001	2001 Gujarat earthquake
21	1985-09-19 13:17:50	516095	253	MEXICOCITY1985	1985 Mexico City earthquake
22	2022-01-15 04:14:45	621831271	252	HUNGATONGAHUNGAAPAI2022	2022 Hunga Tonga–Hunga Haʻapai eruption and tsunami
23	2016-11-13 11:02:59	615035032	251	KAIKOURA2016	2016 Kaikōura earthquake
24	1971-02-09 14:00:40	787038	244	SANFERNANDO1971	1971 San Fernando earthquake
25	1976-07-27 19:42:53	711732	235	TANGSHAN1976	1976 Tangshan earthquake
26	2003-09-25 19:50:07	7134409	221	TOKACHI-OKI2003	2003 Tokachi earthquake
27	2019-07-06 03:19:55	616203758	221	RIDGECREST2019B	2019 Ridgecrest earthquakes
28	1980-11-23 18:34:52	635924	212	IRPINIA1980	1980 Irpinia earthquake
29	2004-10-23 08:55:58	7421058	205	MID-NIIGATA2004	2004 Chūetsu earthquake
30	2012-05-20 02:03:53	601025379	205	EMILIA2012A	2012 Northern Italy earthquakes
31	2011-02-21 23:51:42	16168897	204	CHRISTCHURCH2011	2011 Christchurch earthquake
32	1976-05-06 20:00:12	713583	199	FRIULI1976	1976 Friuli earthquake
33	2005-03-28 16:09:35	7486110	197	NIAS2005	2005 Nias–Simeulue earthquake
34	2004-09-28 17:15:24	7406045	197	PARKFIELD2004	2004 Parkfield earthquake
35	2023-02-06 10:24:50	625614289	195	TURKYIE-SYRIA2023A	2023 Turkey–Syria earthquakes
36	2016-10-30 06:40:19	609624987	194	NORCIA2016	2016 Central Italy earthquakes
37	1923-09-01 02:58:35	911526	193	KANTO1923	Great Kantō Earthquake
38	1999-10-16 09:46:45	1643776	184	HECTOR-MINE1999	1999 Hector Mine earthquake
39	2005-10-08 03:50:37	7703077	181	KASHMIR2005	2005 Kashmir earthquake
40	2017-08-08 13:19:49	610874246	178	JUIZHAIGOU2017	2017 Jinghe earthquake
41	2001-11-14 09:26:12	2331800	176	KUNLUN2001	2001 Kunlun earthquake
42	2015-09-16 22:54:30	611531714	175	ILLAPEL2015	2015 Illapel earthquake
43	2014-04-01 23:46:47	610102185	167	IQUIQUE2014	2014 Iquique earthquake
44	2021-05-21 18:04:13	620437814	166	MADUO2021	2021 Maduo earthquake
45	1979-10-15 23:16:57	657282	165	IMPERIAL1979	1979 Imperial Valley earthquake
46	2002-11-03 22:12:41	6123395	164	DENALI2002	2002 Denali earthquake
47	1999-11-12 16:57:19	1650092	162	DUZCE1999	1999 Düzce earthquake
48	2010-04-04 22:40:43	600257057	158	EL-MAYOR-CUCAPAH2010	2010 Baja California earthquake
49	2019-07-04 17:33:50	616217956	158	RIDGECREST2019A	2019 Ridgecrest earthquakes
50	2010-01-12 21:53:10	14226221	157	HAITI2010	2010 Haiti earthquake

Modified from figure 2, "The most studied events", at the ISC's Overview of the ISC Event Bibliography.

International Seismological Centre. Event Bibliography. Thatcham, United Kingdom. 2018.

== Lists by time period ==
=== By century ===
- Before 1900
- 1901–2000
- 2001–present

=== By decade ===
- 2001–2010
- 2011–2020
- 2021–present

=== By year ===
- 1900
- 1901
- 1902
- 1903
- 1904
- 1905
- 1906
- 1907
- 1908
- 1909
- 1910
- 1911
- 1912
- 1913
- 1914
- 1915
- 1916
- 1917
- 1918
- 1919
- 1920
- 1921
- 1922
- 1923
- 1924
- 1925
- 1926
- 1927
- 1928
- 1929
- 1930
- 1931
- 1932
- 1933
- 1934
- 1935
- 1936
- 1937
- 1938
- 1939
- 1940
- 1941
- 1942
- 1943
- 1944
- 1945
- 1946
- 1947
- 1948
- 1949
- 1950
- 1951
- 1952
- 1953
- 1954
- 1955
- 1956
- 1957
- 1958
- 1959
- 1960
- 1961
- 1962
- 1963
- 1964
- 1965
- 1966
- 1967
- 1968
- 1969
- 1970
- 1971
- 1972
- 1973
- 1974
- 1975
- 1976
- 1977
- 1978
- 1979
- 1980
- 1981
- 1982
- 1983
- 1984
- 1985
- 1986
- 1987
- 1988
- 1989
- 1990
- 1991
- 1992
- 1993
- 1994
- 1995
- 1996
- 1997
- 1998
- 1999
- 2000
- 2001
- 2002
- 2003
- 2004
- 2005
- 2006
- 2007
- 2008
- 2009
- 2010
- 2011
- 2012
- 2013
- 2014
- 2015
- 2016
- 2017
- 2018
- 2019
- 2020
- 2021
- 2022
- 2023
- 2024
- 2025
- 2026

== Lists by location ==
=== By country ===
- Afghanistan
- Albania
- Algeria
- Argentina
  - Mendoza
- Armenia
- Australia
- Azerbaijan
- Bangladesh
- Bosnia and Herzegovina
- Brazil
- Bulgaria
- Canada
- Chile
- China
  - Sichuan
  - Yunnan
- Colombia
- Costa Rica
- Croatia
- Cuba
- Cyprus
- Democratic Republic of the Congo
- Dominican Republic
- East Timor
- Ecuador
- Egypt
- El Salvador
- Eritrea
- Ethiopia
- France
- Fiji
- Georgia
- Germany
- Ghana
- Greece
- Guam
- Guatemala
- Haiti
- Iceland
- India
- Indonesia
- Iran
- Italy
  - Irpinia
- Japan
- Kosovo
- Kazakhstan
- Kyrgyzstan
- Malaysia
- Mexico
- Morocco
- Myanmar
- Nepal
- Netherlands
- New Zealand
- Nicaragua
- North Korea
- Pakistan
- Panama
- Papua New Guinea
- Peru
- Philippines
- Portugal
  - Azores
- Romania
  - Vrancea
- Russia
  - Kamchatka
- Samoa
- Saudi Arabia
- Serbia
- Slovenia
- Solomon Islands
- South Africa
- South Korea
- Spain
- Taiwan
- Tajikistan
- Thailand
- Timor Leste
- Tonga
- Turkey
- United States
  - Alaska
  - California
  - Hawaii
  - Illinois
  - Montana
  - Nevada
  - Oklahoma
  - Puerto Rico
  - South Carolina
  - Texas
  - Utah
  - Washington
- Vanuatu
- Venezuela
- Yemen

=== By region ===
- British Isles
- Caribbean
- Levant
- South Asia

== See also ==
- List of deadly earthquakes since 1900
- List of historical earthquakes
- List of megathrust earthquakes
- List of natural disasters by death toll
