= 1913 Asmara earthquake =

Earthquake in Eritrea

- Location within Eritrea
- UTC time: 1913-02-27 16:22:54
- ISC event: n/a
- USGS-ANSS: n/a
- Local date: February 27, 1913
- Local time: 19:22
- Epicenter: 15.6°N 38.9°E
- Areas affected: Eritrea
- Max. intensity: MMI VI (Strong)

The 1913 Asmara earthquake took place outside Asmara, Eritrea on 27 February. The data as to the magnitude of the earthquake is imprecise due to the frequency and magnitude of aftershocks, but a maximum felt intensity of VI (Strong) on the Mercalli intensity scale was recorded at Asmara. The "felt" area of the earthquake extended into Northern Ethiopia as well as Kassala in Sudan. The earthquake caused significant damage in Asmara (VI), Keren (IV), Massawa (V) and Adi Ugri (V).

== See also ==
- List of earthquakes in 1913
- List of earthquakes in Eritrea
