= 1986 João Câmara earthquake =

Rare earthquake in northeastern Brazil

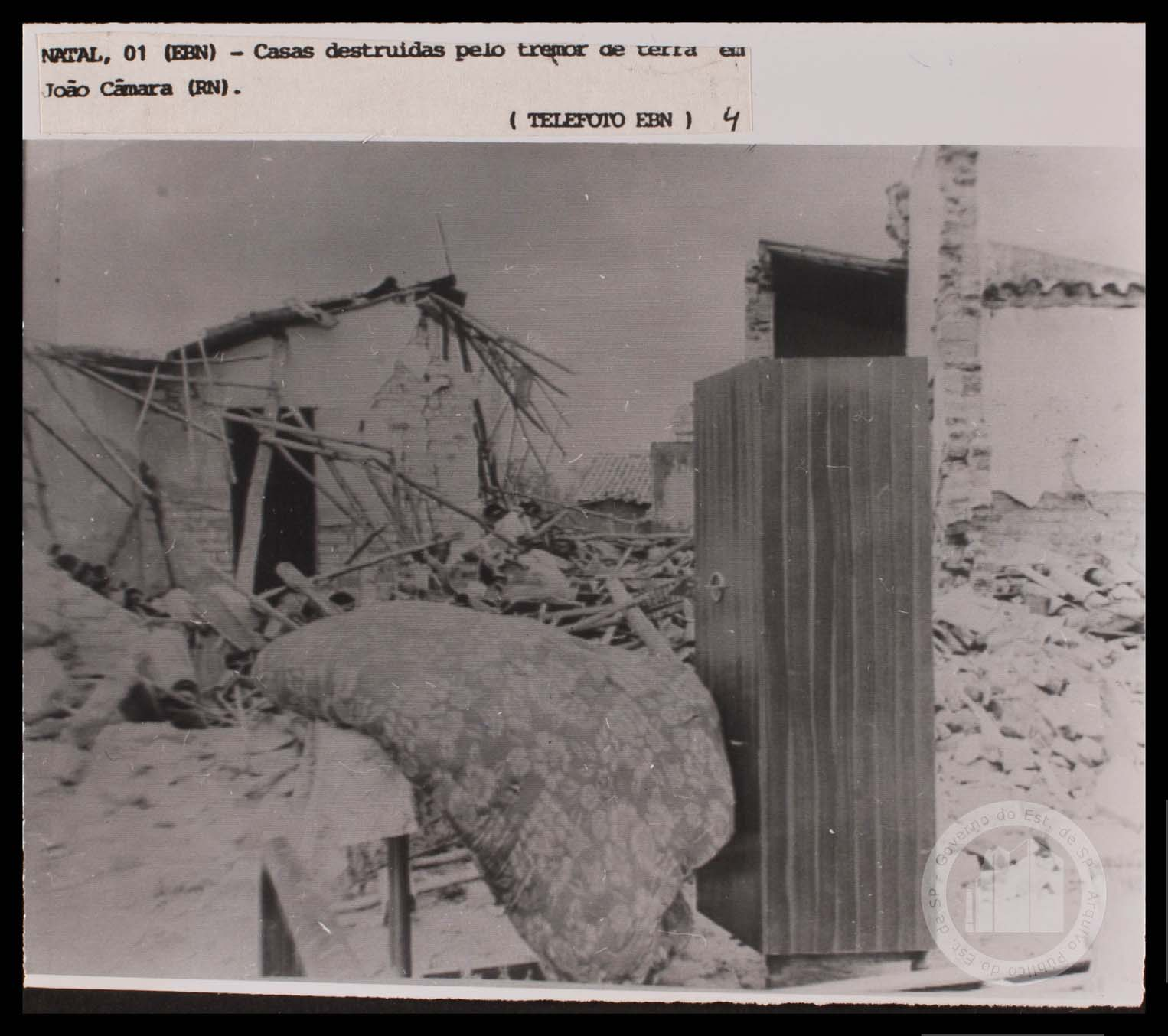
- Destroyed homes following the earthquake

- Location within Brazil
- UTC time: 1986-11-30 05:19:48
- ISC event: 482615
- USGS-ANSS: ComCat
- Local date: 30 November 1986
- Local time: 02:19:48 Brasilia Standard Time
- Magnitude: 5.1 M_{w} 4.9 mb
- Depth: 15 km (9 mi)
- Epicenter: 5.41°S 35.9°W
- Type: Strike-slip
- Areas affected: Rio Grande do Norte, Brazil
- Max. intensity: MMI VII (Very strong)

The 1986 João Câmara earthquake (Portuguese: Sismo de João Câmara de 1986) struck on 30 November 1986 at 02:19 Brasília Time with a moment magnitude of 5.1 near the town of João Câmara, in the state of Rio Grande do Norte, Brazil. The event was felt over a large area of northeastern Brazil, including the cities of Natal and Mossoró. It took place in a more seismically active part of Brazil, where deformation of land at the Brasiliano orogeny between the São Francisco and São Luís cratons formed a series of fault zones in between 1 billion to 538.8 million years ago. The 1986 João Câmara earthquake occurred on one of these fault zones while accompanied by a lengthy series of earthquakes which consisted more than 1,000 recorded events. This mainshock was preceded by a series of foreshocks that began in August and was followed by a series of aftershocks which continued until 1990. Widespread damage to buildings at João Câmara occurred and thousands of people were displaced. The earthquake is widely remembered as one of the most significant events in Brazil's history.

== Tectonic setting ==
Brazil is geologically dominated by three major sedimentary basins; the Amazon, Paraná and Parnaíba basins. These basins of Paleozoic-Mesozoic age are the drainage systems of the South American continent. The rest of the country consists of metamorphic rocks of the Brazilian Shield, a geologic province which consists of four cratons of Archean to Mesoproterozoic age. These cratons are connected by Neoproterozoic collisions which formed the Brasiliano orogeny. The Brasiliano orogeny can be found on the east and northeastern coast of Brazil. Also in this region can be found some remnant aulacogens and rifts from the South America-Africa breakup period.

In the Brasiliano orogeny can be found a group of provinces and belts which make up the Brasiliano orogeny. The one the João Câmara earthquake is involved with is the Borborema Province, a structurally complex wide exposure of Precambrian rocks that cover an area of roughly 400,000 square kilometres (150,000 sq mi) in northeastern Brazil. The Borborema Province consists of five sub-provinces which are separated by shear zones which vary in scale. Deformation in these shear zones are still continuing, therefore seismicity can take place.

== Earthquake ==
Map of the sequence. The yellow star represents the 5.1 quake, the red dashed line represents the extent of the sequence and the thin black lines represent fault lines.

The M_{w} 5.1 earthquake which occurred near João Câmara, a town with a population of 22,000, was the part of an earthquake swarm which started on 5 August 1986, when a magnitude 3.3 earthquake was strongly felt in the town of João Câmara. This, in the next days was followed by multiple 3.0+ quakes until 11 September, with the largest quake being a M_{R} 4.2. Later, the sequence was reactivated when the largest earthquake of the sequence, the João Câmara mainshock, struck with a magnitude of M_{R} 5.1. This triggered a heavy frequency of aftershocks of 3.0+ quakes throughout December and January until the end of January, with the largest aftershock being a M_{R} 4.4. The amount of aftershocks over the magnitude of 3 continued to decrease in frequency until it ended in the later months of 1988. On 10 March 1989, the sequence got reignited when a M_{m} 5.0 struck near the first mainshock, causing additional minor damage at João Câmara. Thousands of events with a magnitude of 0+ were recorded, including 15 earthquakes with a magnitude of 4.0+. The fault plane solutions for the mainshock and the other events have a mutual agreement which indicates southwest–northeast directed strike-slip faulting with a slight normal component in a linear manner along the Samambaia Fault.

Before the 1986 earthquake in the region's history, the last seismic activity had occurred in 1952 and 1983 which was also a small sequence of earthquakes. Six years earlier, a mb 5.2 earthquake had also struck nearby, in Ceará; hence why the northeast of Brazil is considered to be the most seismically active region of the country.

== Impact and response ==
Property damage from the 5.1 was widespread mostly near João Câmara; although in the same place minor damage was caused in the August–September 1986 events as well. More than 4,000 homes were destroyed or damaged; 500 of those were rebuilt using a typical design made by the Brazilian Army, which consists of timber panels with concrete infill. Multiple buildings other than homes made of brick or stone suffered extensive amounts of cracks. In some cases including the church of the city suffered collapsing of walls. A seriously damaged hospital and a few schools were completely rebuilt of reinforced concrete. Out of the brick buildings, buildings made of poor quality brick were mostly damaged. Cracks or wall collapses usually happened on buildings with poor mortars or sun-dried bricks with poor quality. Collapses of tiled roofs were also widespread. Newer buildings and buildings made of concrete received little to no damage. More than 10,000 people were displaced as a result of the earthquakes, mostly in fear of landslides.

As a response to the earthquake, four vertical component short period seismometers were deployed in the area in order to locate events in a more easier way and understand the characteristics of the earthquakes. José Sarney, the president of Brazil, as well as several other ministers, visited the area which was hit by the earthquake. Camps were also set-up to shelter displaced residents.

== See also ==
- List of earthquakes in Brazil
