= List of earthquakes in 1936 =

Earthquakes in 1936
Approximate epicenters of the earthquakes in 1936
- 4.0–5.9 magnitude
- 6.0–6.9 magnitude
- 7.0–7.9 magnitude
- 8.0+ magnitude
- Strongest: Dutch East Indies, Talaud Islands, (Magnitude 7.8) April 1
- Deadliest: China, Guangxi Province, (Magnitude 6.8) April 1 1,001 deaths
- Total fatalities: 2,128

Number by magnitude
- 9.0+: 0

This is a list of earthquakes in 1936. Only magnitude 6.0 or greater earthquakes appear on the list. Lower magnitude events are included if they have caused death, injury or damage. Events which occurred in remote areas will be excluded from the list as they wouldn't have generated significant media interest. All dates are listed according to UTC time. The Dutch East Indies and China in particular had the main bulk of the activity in this year. The Dutch East Indies saw five of the 13 magnitude 7.0+ events. China on the other hand had six earthquakes which resulted in substantial numbers of deaths during the year.

== Overall ==
=== By death toll ===
Rank	Death toll	Magnitude	Location	MMI	Depth (km)	Date
1	1,001	6.8	China, Guangxi Province	IX (Violent)	0.0	April 1
2	400	0.0	El Salvador, off the coast of	( )	0.0	December 19
3	250	7.0	Colombia, Narino Department	( )	0.0	January 9
4	115	6.0	China, Gansu Province	VIII (Severe)	35.0	August 1
= 5	101	6.8	China, Gansu Province	IX (Violent)	15.0	February 7
= 5	101	6.7	China, Sichuan Province	IX (Violent)	15.0	April 26
6	51	5.5	China, Xinjiang Province	( )	0.0	November 11
7	30	5.5	China, Yunnan Province	VII (Very strong)	0.0	August 17
8	18	0.0	Colombia, Pasto, Colombia	( )	0.0	August 14
9	17	0.0	Dutch East Indies, northern Sumatra	VIII (Severe)	0.0	September 9
10	12	6.2	Iran, South Khorasan Province	( )	35.0	June 30
11	10	7.1	Taiwan, southeast of	( )	15.0	August 22

- Note: At least 10 casualties

=== By magnitude ===
Rank	Magnitude	Death toll	Location	MMI	Depth (km)	Date
1	7.8	0	Dutch East Indies, Talaud Islands	IX (Violent)	35.0	April 1
= 2	7.5	0	Russian SFSR, off the east coast of Kamchatka	X (Extreme)	15.0	June 30
= 2	7.5	1	Chile, Antofagasta Region	( )	35.0	July 13
3	7.4	0	British Solomon Islands	( )	20.0	April 19
= 4	7.2	0	Dutch East Indies, northern Sumatra	( )	20.0	September 19
= 4	7.2	0	Japan, off the east coast of Honshu	( )	35.0	November 2
= 4	7.2	0	Russian SFSR, off the east coast of Kamchatka	X (Extreme)	20.0	November 13
= 5	7.1	0	Dutch East Indies, off the south coast of West Papua (province)	( )	15.0	February 15
= 5	7.1	10	Taiwan, southeast of	( )	15.0	August 22
= 6	7.0	250	Colombia, Narino Department	( )	0.0	January 9
= 6	7.0	9	Dutch East Indies, off the west coast of northern Sumatra	VIII (Severe)	50.0	August 23
= 6	7.0	0	Dutch East Indies, Molucca Sea	( )	15.0	October 5

- Note: At least 7.0 magnitude

== Notable events ==
=== January ===
January
- Strongest: 7.0 M_{w} Colombia
- Deadliest: 7.0 M_{w} Colombia; 250 deaths
- Total fatalities: 250

Number by magnitude
- 8.0–8.9: 0
- 7.0–7.9: 1
- 6.0–6.9: 6

Date	Country and location	M_{w}	Depth (km)	MMI	Notes	Casualties	
Date	Country and location	M_{w}	Depth (km)	MMI	Notes	Dead	Injured
2	Dutch East Indies, north of Sumba	6.3	35.0				
2	Dutch East Indies, Batu Islands	6.7	30.0		Aftershock of 1935 Sumatra earthquake.		
9	Colombia, Narino Department	7.0	0.0		250 people were killed and some property damage was reported. Depth unknown.	250	
14	Argentina, Santiago del Estero Province	6.7	605.0				
14	New Hebrides	6.6	25.0				
20	Philippines, southeast of Mindanao	6.7	35.0				
22	Dutch East Indies, southern Sumatra	6.2	80.0				

=== February ===
February
- Strongest: 7.1 M_{w} Dutch East Indies
- Deadliest: 6.8 M_{w} China; 101+ deaths
- Total fatalities: 101+

Number by magnitude
- 8.0–8.9: 0
- 7.0–7.9: 1
- 6.0–6.9: 11

Date	Country and location	M_{w}	Depth (km)	MMI	Notes	Casualties	
Date	Country and location	M_{w}	Depth (km)	MMI	Notes	Dead	Injured
7	China, Gansu Province	6.8	15.0	IX	At least 101 people were killed and another 101 were hurt. Damage was extensive in the area with 9,650 homes being destroyed.	101+	101+
8	New Guinea, Madang Province	6.2	100.0				
10	Fiji	6.6	400.0				
12	Dutch East Indies, Java Sea	6.5	600.0				
15	Dutch East Indies, West Papua (province)	7.1	15.0				
16	France, Loyalty Islands, New Caledonia	6.5	160.0				
21	Japan, Nara Prefecture, Honshu	6.0	35.0				
21	New Guinea, East Sepik Province	6.4	35.0				
22	New Zealand, Auckland Islands	6.9	15.0				
22	New Zealand, Auckland Islands	6.4	15.0		Aftershock.		
27	Dutch East Indies, Barat Daya Islands	6.6	100.0				
28	Dutch East Indies, Java Sea	6.5	35.0				

=== March ===
March
- Strongest: 6.7 M_{w} Japan
- Total fatalities: 0

Number by magnitude
- 8.0–8.9: 0
- 7.0–7.9: 0
- 6.0–6.9: 1

Date	Country and location	M_{w}	Depth (km)	MMI	Notes	Casualties	
Date	Country and location	M_{w}	Depth (km)	MMI	Notes	Dead	Injured
2	Japan, southeast of Hokkaido	6.7	25.0				

=== April ===
April
- Strongest: 7.8 M_{w} Dutch East Indies
- Deadliest: 6.8 M_{w} China; 1,001 deaths
- Total fatalities: 1,102

Number by magnitude
- 8.0–8.9: 0
- 7.0–7.9: 2
- 6.0–6.9: 9

Date	Country and location	M_{w}	Depth (km)	MMI	Notes	Casualties	
Date	Country and location	M_{w}	Depth (km)	MMI	Notes	Dead	Injured
1	Dutch East Indies, Talaud Islands	7.8	35.0	IX	3 people were injured. 169 homes were destroyed.		3
1	Dutch East Indies, Talaud Islands	6.6	35.0		Aftershock.		
1	China, Guangxi Province	6.8	0.0	IX	Main article: 1936 Lingshan earthquake	1,001+	
2	New Guinea, west of New Ireland (island)	6.4	25.0				
12	Federated States of Micronesia	6.7	15.0				
15	Dutch East Indies, south of Java	6.0	100.0				
19	British Solomon Islands	7.4	20.0				
19	India, Andaman Islands	6.5	35.0				
26	China, Sichuan Province	6.7	15.0	IX	At least 101 people were killed and many homes collapsed.	101+	
28	Dutch East Indies, Banda Sea	6.5	200.0				
30	Argentina, Cordoba Province (Argentina)	6.0	200.0				

=== May ===
May
- Strongest: 6.8 M_{w} 3 events
- Total fatalities: 0

Number by magnitude
- 8.0–8.9: 0
- 7.0–7.9: 0
- 6.0–6.9: 11

Date	Country and location	M_{w}	Depth (km)	MMI	Notes	Casualties	
Date	Country and location	M_{w}	Depth (km)	MMI	Notes	Dead	Injured
6	Peru, Ucayali Region	6.0	160.0				
8	Dutch East Indies, east of Bawean	6.5	620.0				
11	New Guinea, southeast of New Britain	6.6	25.0				
16	China, Sichuan Province	6.8	15.0				
19	Dutch East Indies, east of Bawean	6.5	610.0				
19	Dutch East Indies, north of West Timor	6.4	70.0				
20	Philippines, Tayabas Bay	6.0	160.0				
20	British Solomon Islands, western Guadalcanal	6.8	15.0				
22	Argentina, San Luis Province	6.2	15.0				
25	New Guinea, Bismarck Sea	6.4	15.0				
27	Nepal, Gandaki Province	6.8	15.0				

=== June ===
June
- Strongest: 7.5 M_{w} Russian SFSR
- Deadliest: 6.2 M_{w} Iran; 12 deaths
- Total fatalities: 12

Number by magnitude
- 8.0–8.9: 0
- 7.0–7.9: 1
- 6.0–6.9: 6

Date	Country and location	M_{w}	Depth (km)	MMI	Notes	Casualties	
Date	Country and location	M_{w}	Depth (km)	MMI	Notes	Dead	Injured
3	Japan, off the east coast of Honshu	6.0	80.0				
9	Dutch East Indies, Batu Islands	6.6	35.0				
10	New Guinea, off the east coast of mainland	6.9	150.0				
22	Bolivia, Potosi Department	6.0	100.0				
29	Afghanistan, Badakhshan Province	6.6	205.0				
30	Russian SFSR, off the east coast of Kamchatka	7.5	15.0	X			
30	Iran, South Khorasan Province	6.2	35.0		12 people were killed and some damage was reported.	12	

=== July ===
July
- Strongest: 7.5 M_{w} Chile
- Deadliest: 5.0 M_{w} Korea; 9 deaths
- Total fatalities: 10

Number by magnitude
- 8.0–8.9: 0
- 7.0–7.9: 1
- 6.0–6.9: 6
- 5.0–5.9: 2

Date	Country and location	M_{w}	Depth (km)	MMI	Notes	Casualties	
Date	Country and location	M_{w}	Depth (km)	MMI	Notes	Dead	Injured
3	Korea, South Jeolla Province	5.0	0.0		Main article: 1936 Jirisan earthquake	9	
4	Peru, Tacna Region	6.0	140.0				
4	Dutch East Indies, Malacca Strait	6.5	200.0				
5	Philippines, southeast of Mindanao	6.7	35.0				
13	Chile, Antofagasta Region	7.5	35.0		1 person died and a further 40 were hurt. Many homes were destroyed.	1	40
16	United States, Milton-Freewater, Oregon	5.8	5.0	VII			
26	Chile, off the coast of Antofagasta Region	6.6	35.0		Aftershock.		
28	New Guinea, East Sepik Province	6.4	35.0	rowspan="2"| Doublet earthquake			
28	New Guinea, East Sepik Province	6.3	15.0				

=== August ===
August
- Strongest: 7.1 M_{w} Taiwan 2 events
- Deadliest: 6.0 M_{w} China; 115 deaths
- Total fatalities: 182

Number by magnitude
- 8.0–8.9: 0
- 7.0–7.9: 3
- 6.0–6.9: 3
- 5.0–5.9: 1

Date	Country and location	M_{w}	Depth (km)	MMI	Notes	Casualties	
Date	Country and location	M_{w}	Depth (km)	MMI	Notes	Dead	Injured
1	China, Gansu Province	6.0	35.0	VIII	115 people died and 31 were injured. 4,459 homes were destroyed in the area.	115	31
13	Philippines, east of Mindanao	6.5	35.0				
14	Colombia, Pasto, Colombia	0.0	0.0		18 deaths were caused. Magnitude and depth unknown.	18	
17	China, Yunnan Province	5.5	0.0	VII	30 people were killed and many homes were destroyed.	30	
22	Taiwan, southeast of	7.1	15.0	rowspan="2"| 10 people were killed with a further 10 injured. 15 homes were destroyed. Doublet earthquake.	10	10	
22	Taiwan, southeast of	7.1	35.0				
23	Dutch East Indies, off the west coast of northern Sumatra	7.0	50.0	VIII	9 people were killed and another 20 were injured. Some damage was caused.	9	20

=== September ===
September
- Strongest: 7.2 M_{w} Dutch East Indies
- Deadliest: 0.0 M_{w} Dutch East Indies; 17 deaths
- Total fatalities: 17

Number by magnitude
- 8.0–8.9: 0
- 7.0–7.9: 1
- 6.0–6.9: 0

Date	Country and location	M_{w}	Depth (km)	MMI	Notes	Casualties	
Date	Country and location	M_{w}	Depth (km)	MMI	Notes	Dead	Injured
9	Dutch East Indies, northern Sumatra	0.0	0.0	VIII	17 people were killed and some damage was caused. Magnitude and depth unknown.	17	
19	Dutch East Indies, northern Sumatra	7.2	20.0				

=== October ===
October
- Strongest: 7.0 M_{w} Dutch East Indies
- Total fatalities: 0

Number by magnitude
- 8.0–8.9: 0
- 7.0–7.9: 1
- 6.0–6.9: 6

Date	Country and location	M_{w}	Depth (km)	MMI	Notes	Casualties	
Date	Country and location	M_{w}	Depth (km)	MMI	Notes	Dead	Injured
3	Dutch East Indies, north of the Minahasa Peninsula, Sulawesi	6.6	25.0				
4	New Zealand, Kermadec Islands	6.5	35.0				
5	Dutch East Indies, Molucca Sea	7.0	15.0				
19	Dutch East Indies, Sula Islands	6.5	15.0				
25	Japan, south of Honshu	6.2	80.0				
25	Japan, Mie Prefecture, Honshu	6.2	380.0				
29	United States, northeast of Guam	6.5	75.0				

=== November ===
November
- Strongest: 7.2 M_{w} 2 events
- Deadliest: 5.5 M_{w} China; 51 deaths
- Total fatalities: 51

Number by magnitude
- 8.0–8.9: 0
- 7.0–7.9: 2
- 6.0–6.9: 9
- 5.0–5.9: 1

Date	Country and location	M_{w}	Depth (km)	MMI	Notes	Casualties	
Date	Country and location	M_{w}	Depth (km)	MMI	Notes	Dead	Injured
2	Russian SFSR, Kuril Islands	6.7	35.0				
2	Japan, off the east coast of Honshu	7.2	35.0		1936 Miyagi earthquake.		
7	Chile, Antofagasta Region	6.0	200.0				
11	China, Xinjiang Province	5.5	0.0		At least 51 people were killed and some damage was caused.	51+	
12	Russian SFSR, Sea of Okhotsk	6.5	150.0				
13	Russian SFSR, off the east coast of Kamchatka	7.2	20.0	X	Some damage was caused.		
15	Fiji	6.5	540.0				
19	Guatemala, Santa Rosa Department, Guatemala	6.6	45.0				
22	Guatemala, off the south coast	6.3	45.0		Aftershock.		
26	Fiji	6.5	560.0				
29	Bolivia, Potosi Department	6.0	230.0				
30	Dutch East Indies, Ceram Sea	6.2	35.0				

=== December ===
December
- Strongest: 6.7 M_{w} New Zealand
- Deadliest: 0.0 M_{w} El Salvador; 400 deaths
- Total fatalities: 403

Number by magnitude
- 8.0–8.9: 0
- 7.0–7.9: 0
- 6.0–6.9: 7

Date	Country and location	M_{w}	Depth (km)	MMI	Notes	Casualties	
Date	Country and location	M_{w}	Depth (km)	MMI	Notes	Dead	Injured
1	Japan, Ryukyu Islands	6.5	270.0				
5	Chile, off the coast of Tarapaca Region	6.0	100.0				
19	El Salvador, off the coast	0.0	0.0		400 people were killed. The magnitude and depth were unknown.	400	
20	Dutch East Indies, Sunda Strait	6.3	35.0				
21	Canada, Haida Gwaii	6.0	35.0				
26	New Zealand, Kermadec Islands	6.7	35.0				
27	Japan, Izu Islands	0.0	0.0		3 people were killed and some damage was caused. The magnitude and depth were unknown.	3	
29	Guatemala, off the southwest coast	6.4	15.0				
29	New Guinea, east of New Ireland (island)	6.6	35.0				
