= List of earthquakes in Eritrea =

This is a list of earthquakes in Eritrea:

Date	Region	M	MMI	Deaths	Injuries	Comments	Sources
1733-11-29	Ethiopia–Eritrea			Some			NGDC
1861-05-07	Ethiopia-Dubbi	-		106		Two villages destroyed. Shock part of a sequence that accompanied eruption of Dubbi Volcano	NGDC
1875-11-02	Ethiopia–Eritrea	6.2					NGDC
1884-07-20	Massawa–Muncullo	6.2				Moderate damage / tsunami / many houses destroyed	NGDC
1913-02-27	Asmara		VI				NGDC
1915-09-23	Asmara	6. 8 M_{s}, 6.2 M_{w}	VI				NGDC
1921-08-14	Massawa	5.9 M_{s}	VIII	A few			NGDC
1945-03-31	Asmara	6.2 M_{w}					
Note: The inclusion criteria for adding events are based on WikiProject Earthquakes' notability guideline that was developed for stand alone articles. The principles described also apply to lists. In summary, only damaging, injurious, or deadly events should be recorded.

== See also ==
- Geology of Eritrea
