= 1990 South Sudan earthquakes =

Earthquake sequence in South Sudan

- UTC time: 1990-05-20 02:22:01; 1990-05-24 19:34:44; 1990-05-24 20:00:08; 1990-07-09 15:11:20
- ISC event: 369792; 370208; 370216; 362203
- USGS-ANSS: ComCat; ComCat; ComCat; ComCat
- Local date: 20 May 1990 to 9 July 1990
- Local time: 04:22:01; 21:34:44; 22:00:08; 17:11:20
- Magnitude: 7.2 M_{w}; 6.5 M_{w}; 7.1 M_{w}; 6.6 M_{w}
- Epicenter: 5.121°N 32.145°E
- Type: Strike-slip & Normal
- Areas affected: South Sudan
- Total damage: Yes
- Max. intensity: MMI VIII (Severe)
- Casualties: 31 dead

Between 20 May and 9 July 1990, present day South Sudan was rocked by a series of violent earthquakes. It started with the largest event (M_{w} 7.2), and continued with multiple very large aftershocks for the next couple of months. The earthquake sequence ruptured over a length of 50 km (31 mi). It contains some of the largest recorded earthquakes anywhere in Africa.

== Tectonic setting ==
The East African Rift System (EARS) is a system of rifts and associated rift lakes within the eastern portion of the African continent. It accommodates the internal breakup of Africa. It is a boundary between the Somali and African plate. The Victoria and Rovuma microplates help accommodate additional more local stresses. The eastern portion of the rift runs from the Afar rift to Tanzania, while the western portion runs from Lake Albert (Africa) in Uganda all the way down to Mozambique.

The Aswa Rift Zone (ARZ) is an important geologic structure in the area near the earthquakes. The ARZ may act as a broad zone of faulting that links together the eastern and western portions of the EARS. The mainshock occurred along a fault where the ARZ and EARS meet.

== Earthquake sequence ==
=== 20 May mainshock ===
The first and largest earthquake in the sequence struck near Juba at 02:22:01 on 20 May 1990. The event had a mb of 6.5-6.7, M_{s} of 7.1-7.4, and M_{w} of 7.2, and struck at a depth of 7–15 km (4.3–9.3 mi). (Note: mb 6.5-mb 6.7 M_{s} 7.1-7.4 M_{w} 7.2 7 km depth-15 km) Its focal mechanism shows left-lateral (sinistral) strike-slip faulting, which is consistent with the shear forces in the area of the ARZ. The earthquake ruptured over an area of 26–60 km (16–37 mi) by 40 km (25 mi). The average slip in the rupture was 0.56–1.1 m (1 ft 10 in – 3 ft 7 in) and it had a stress drop of 1.63-1.65 MPa. The earthquake had an aftershock length of 120 km (75 mi). The earthquake was preceded by a low-frequency slow slip signal immediately before the high-frequency main event, which could mean the event was an amalgamation of a slow and normal earthquake. The earthquake killed 31 people and damaged some buildings in Juba, and some in Moyo, Uganda. The Nile's banks had fissures, and a bridge near Torit was destroyed. The shock was felt for up to 800 km (500 mi). This event is believed to be the largest earthquake ever recorded in South Sudan, and is one of the largest events known in all of Africa.

=== 24 May foreshock ===
At 19:34:44 on 24 May 1990, another large earthquake struck southern South Sudan. It occurred at a depth of 10–14 km (6.2–8.7 mi) with a mb of 6.1, M_{s} of 6.5-6.8 and M_{w} of 6.5-6.6. By analyzing body waves, the earthquake was found to have slipped in a normal sense.

=== 24 May mainshock ===
At 20:00:08, only a little over 25 minutes after the foreshock, an even stronger earthquake struck the region: the second strongest of the whole sequence. This event was a mb 6.6, M_{s} 7.0, M_{w} 7.1 earthquake that occurred at a depth of 10–40 km (6.2–24.9 mi). The focal mechanism of the earthquake was normal faulting. It caused additional structural damage to buildings previously affected by the first and strongest shock, however, no casualties occurred. The worst damage was observed in uninhabited areas.

=== 9 July mainshock ===
After the sequence had largely finished, another large shock struck the area for a final time. The last big earthquake in the sequence was a mb 6.0, M_{s} 6.4-6.5 and M_{w} 6.6 event. It occurred at a depth of 10–11 km (6.2–6.8 mi). Focal mechanism solutions are split, with a roughly equal proportion of agencies and studies preferring a strike-slip event, with another equal proportion believing it to be a normal faulting event.

== Damage ==
The first mainshock killed 31 people and damaged buildings in Juba and Moyo, Uganda. Shaking was felt as far as Nakuru, Kenya. The mainshock of May 24 did further damage. Government buildings and private institutions were damaged in Terekeka, South Sudan. Older buildings in Juba reported cracked walls. Between 8,000 and 10,000 of the displaced required extra relief and shelter. 300,000 people were made homeless across the region as a result of the earthquakes.

== See also ==
- List of earthquakes in 1990
- 2006 Mozambique earthquake
