= 1936 Miyagi earthquake =

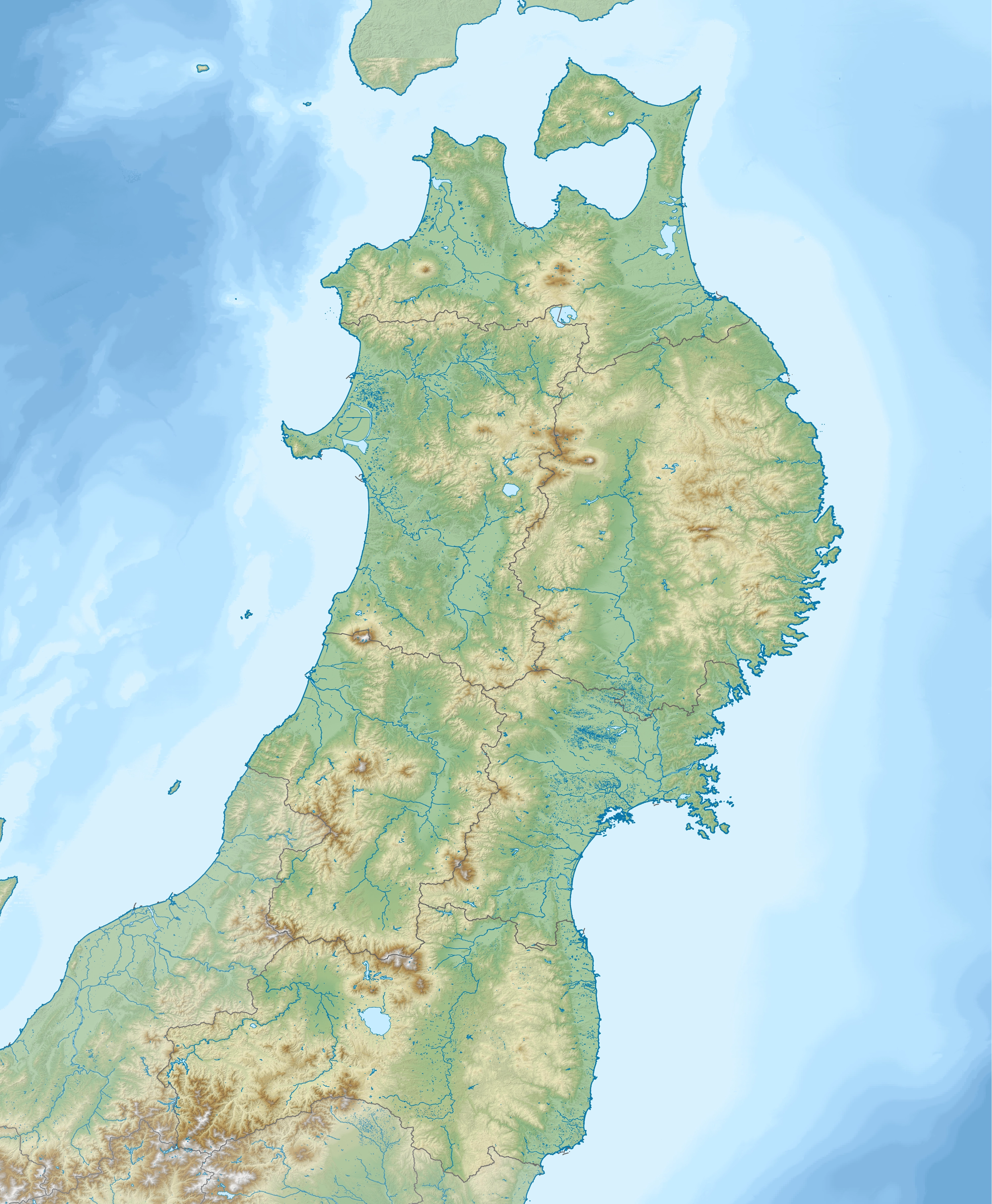
- Location within Tohoku, Japan
- UTC time: 1936-11-02 20:45:57
- ISC event: 903917
- USGS-ANSS: ComCat
- Local date: November 3, 1936
- Local time: 05:45
- Magnitude: 7.2 M_{s}
- Depth: 61 km (38 mi)
- Epicenter: 38.2°N 142.1°E
- Areas affected: Japan
- Tsunami: Yes

An earthquake occurred on November 3 at 05:45 local time with a magnitude M_{s} 7.2, or M_{JMA} 7.4. The epicenter was located off the Miyagi Prefecture, Japan. Four people were injured and buildings were damaged. In Isobe (磯部) village, nowadays part of Sōma, Fukushima, a small market building collapsed. A tsunami was recorded.

This was one of the recurring interplate earthquakes at the offshore Miyagi with a recurrence interval of about 37 years. Although not officially named by the Japanese Meteorological Agency, in Japanese, this earthquake is commonly known as 1936年宮城県沖地震 (Sen-kyūhyaku-sanjūroku-nen Miyagi-ken-oki Jishin) or 1936年金華山沖地震 (Sen-kyūhyaku-sanjūroku-nen Kinkasan-oki Jishin).

== See also ==
- List of earthquakes in 1936
- List of earthquakes in Japan
