= List of earthquakes in North Korea =

This is a list of earthquakes in North Korea. Many of these in these in the 21st century have been attributed to nuclear weapons testing.

== Earthquakes ==
Date	Region	Mag.	MMI	Deaths	Injuries	Total damage / notes	Source
1810-02-19	North Hamgyong Province	7.3 M_{w}	IX				
1905-08-25	North Hamgyong Province	6.6 mb					
1944-12-19	Liaoning	6.6 M_{w}	VII				
1952-03-19	North Hwanghae Province	6.4 M_{w}	VI			Mainschock	
1952-04-23	South Hwanghae Province	5.6 M_{w}	VI			Aftershock	
1960-10-08	North Hamgyong Province	6.8 M_{w}	II				
1973-09-29	Rason	7.7 M_{w}					
1977-01-04	North Hamgyong Province	4.1 mb					
1977-03-09	Rason	6.9 M_{w}					
1979-08-16	Rason	6.7 mb					
1980-01-07	North Pyongan Province	5.0 mb	V				
1982-02-14	South Hwanghae Province	5.2 M_{w}					
1988-10-15	North Hwanghae Province	4.8 mb					
1989-05-22	North Hwanghae Province	4.1 M_{L}					
1990-05-11	Rason	6.3 M_{w}					
1992-11-11	Pyongyang	4.3 mb					
1995-07-24	South Hwanghae Province	4.7 mb					
1995-01-24	North Hamgyong Province	4.7 mb					
1995-08-11	South Hwanghae Province	4.0 mb					
2000-09-08	Rason	4.9 mb					
2002-03-17	South Hwanghae Province	3.9 mb					
2002-12-24	North Hamgyong Province	4.5 mb					
2006-10-03	Punggye-ri	4.2 mb				Explosion	
2007-12-16	Rason	4.5 mb					
2009-05-25	Punggye-ri	4.7 mb				Explosion	
2010-02-18	Primorsky Krai	6.9 M_{w}					
2013-02-12	Punggye-ri	5.1 mb	VI			Explosion	
2013-04-05	Primorsky Krai	6.3 M_{w}	III				
2016-01-06	Punggye-ri	5.1 mb	VII			Explosion	
2016-09-09	Punggye-ri	5.3 mb	VIII			Explosion	
2017-09-03	Punggye-ri	6.3 mb	VI	12	150	Explosion	
2017-07-12	North Hamgyong Province	5.9 M_{ww}	II				
2019-06-27	Pyongyang	3.6 mb					
2019-07-15	Rason	4.2 mb					
2020-05-11	North Hwanghae Province	3.8 mb					
2021-08-16	Rason	4.3 mb					
2022-01-06	Rason	4.3 mb					
2023-09-06	North Hamgyong Province	4.9 mb					
2025-01-06	Rason	4.1 mb					
