= 1924 Pasinler earthquake =

Earthquake in Erzurum Province, Turkey

- Location within Turkey
- UTC time: 1924-09-13 14:34:15
- ISC event: 911110
- USGS-ANSS: ComCat
- Local date: 13 September 1924
- Local time: 16:34
- Magnitude: 6.8 M_{s}
- Epicenter: 40.0°N 42.0°E
- Areas affected: Turkey
- Max. intensity: MMI IX (Violent)
- Casualties: 60 deaths

The 1924 Pasinler earthquake occurred at 16:34 local time on 13 September in Pasinler, Erzurum, Eastern Anatolia region of Turkey. It had a surface-wave magnitude of 6.8 and reached a maximum felt intensity of IX (Violent) on the Mercalli intensity scale, causing 60 deaths.

== See also ==
- List of earthquakes in 1924
- List of earthquakes in Turkey
