= 1915 Asmara earthquake =

Earthquake in Eritrea

- Location within Eritrea
- UTC time: 1915-09-23 08:14:47
- ISC event: 913942
- USGS-ANSS: ComCat
- Local date: September 23, 1915
- Local time: 11:14
- Magnitude: 6.2 M_{w}^{(ISC-GEM)}
- Epicenter: 14.48°N 38.69°E
- Areas affected: Eritrea
- Max. intensity: MMI VI (Strong)

The 1915 Asmara earthquake took place outside Asmara, Eritrea on September 23 with an M_{w} of 6.2 and a maximum perceived intensity of VI (Strong) on the Mercalli intensity scale.

== Effects ==
The event caused panic among the inhabitants and minor damage. The earthquake is described by experts as being of relatively large magnitude.

== See also ==
- List of earthquakes in 1915
- List of earthquakes in Eritrea
