= List of earthquakes in Timor-Leste =

Earthquakes in Timor-Leste (East Timor) are frequent but rarely cause damage, unless they are powerful. The earthquakes occur due to a convergent boundary between the Indo-Australian Plate and the Eurasian Plate. Earthquakes near East Timor are also listed, because the powerful ones have often caused damage in the country.

== Earthquakes ==
Date	Region	Mag.	MMI	Deaths	Injuries	Comments	Ref
2021-12-29	Maluku, Indonesia	7.3 M_{w}	VII			Seven houses destroyed in East Timor.	
2021-12-16	Maluku, Indonesia	5.6 M_{w}	VI			Minor damage	
2021-12-11	Maluku, Indonesia	5.4 M_{w}	VI			Minor damage	
2015-11-04	Alor, Indonesia	6.5 M_{w}	VII			Minor damage	
2008-02-13	Timor Sea	6.1				Moderate damage	
2004-11-11	Alor, Indonesia	7.5 M_{w}	VIII	34	400	Severe damage	
2004-04-23	Timor	6.7 M_{w}	V			Minor damage in Kupang, Indonesia	
1995-05-14	Timor	6.9 M_{w}	VIII	11		Minor damage/tsunami	
1991-07-04	Alor, Indonesia	6.9 M_{w}	VII	23	181	Severe damage	
1989-07-14	Alor, Indonesia	6.7 M_{w}	VII		7	Minor damage	
1987-11-26	Alor, Indonesia	6.7 M_{w}	VII	37	108	Moderate damage	
1983-11-24	Maluku, Indonesia	7.3 M_{w}	VI			Felt as far as Australia.	
1966-06-22	Flores Sea	7.0 M_{w}	III			Intermediate depth	
Note: The inclusion criteria for adding events are based on WikiProject Earthquakes' notability guideline that was developed for stand alone articles. The principles described also apply to lists. In summary, only damaging, injurious, or deadly events should be recorded.
