= List of earthquakes in Ghana =

The following is a list of notable earthquakes or tremors that happened in Ghana. So far it has been recorded that the worst earthquake Ghana has ever experienced was in 1939, which occurred in Accra, located in the Greater Accra Region killing 17 people and damaging a lot of properties.

== Earthquake data ==
For earthquakes prior to the modern era, the magnitude and epicentre location are only approximate, and were calculated based on available reports from the time. The magnitude where given is measured using the Richter scale ($M_L$) unless stated otherwise.

Date	Time (GMT)	Epicentre	$M_L$	Depth	Notes	Sources monitoring
1862			6.5		This earthquake was felt in Togo and Benin as well. It caused much damage and killed three people.	
1906		Ho			Much damage was recorded.	
22 June 1939		Accra	6.6		This earthquake killed seventeen to twenty two people and injured one hundred and thirty three	
8 January 1997		Accra	3.8			
15 February 1997		Accra	4.1			
6 March 1997	15:16	6.2 kilometres from Gbawe	4.8	10 km		
May 2003		Accra	3.8			
January 2006		Accra	3.7			
26 September 2007	15:00	385.2 kilometres from Takoradi	5.2	33 km		
9 December 2018	7:50	Weija and Gbawe	2.6			
13 January 2019		Accra	2.6			
24 June 2020	22:53	Accra	4.0	10 km	The earthquake was felt in Gbawe, McCarthy Hill, Kaneshie, Tesano, Dansoman, Dunkanaa, Lapaz, Achimota, Santa Maria, Adenta, Weija, Madina, Kwabenya, East Legon, Nsawam, Koforidua, Swedru, Dodowa, Tema among other areas.	
12 December 2022	11:53 am	10 km from Gbawe	4.0	10 km	The phenomenon took place at 11:53 am local time (12 December 2022), occurred three times in the space of five hours. The first was experienced at 6:53 am, also in the western part of Accra, the second around 10am at same places and the third occurred 11:53am, 10 km from Gbawe.	
