= 1810 North Korea earthquake =

Earthquake in present-day North Korea

- Location within North Korea
- Local date: 19 February 1810
- Magnitude: 7.3 M_{w}
- Epicenter: 41.6°N 130.0°E
- Areas affected: Joseon (present-day North Korea)
- Max. intensity: MMI IX (Violent)
- Casualties: Unspecified number

An earthquake struck present-day North Korea during the Joseon Dynasty. The earthquake had an estimated moment magnitude of 7.3 and affected present-day North Hamgyong Province. The maximum Modified Mercalli intensity was assigned VIII to IX. Eighty-three homes collapsed and livestock were destroyed. A landslide killed at least two people while additional fatalities occurred during a stampede.

Historical documents indicate it occurred in the early morning. The towns of Myeongcheon, Gyeongseong, and Hoeryeong were affected; fortresses and homes were razed, landslides occurred and people were killed. In Buryeongbu, 38 homes were destroyed and residents also died.

The earthquake may have occurred on a section of the Yilan-Yitong Fault Zone in Shangzhi, China, through paleoseismology. The Yilan-Yitong Fault Zone is the northern branch of the larger Tanlu Fault. The Tanlu Fault is a 3,600 km (2,200 mi) long continental strike-slip fault extending from southern China through the country's northeast, into Bohai Bay and Russia. The Yilan-Yitong Fault Zone is located north of Bohai Bay. It is considered a major seismic hazard in the region as it represents an active boundary between the tectonics of north Asia. A paleoearthquake identified through trenching studied may correspond to historical records of an earthquake affecting Ning'an in 1810.
