= Geology of Eritrea =

The geology of Eritrea in east Africa broadly consists of Precambrian rocks in the west, Paleozoic glacial sedimentary rocks in the South and Cenozoic sediments and volcanics along the coastal zone adjoining the Red Sea. The Precambrian rocks been involved with the orogeny process, which is when a section of the Earth's crust is deformed to form a mountain range. Mesozoic sediments in the Danakil and Aysha horsts, which are raised blocks of the Earth's crust that have been lifted, were deformed. The older rocks include meta-sediments and older gneissic basement belonging to different Proterozoic terranes. Mesozoic sediments of marine origin occur in the coastal area along the Red Sea. A number of thin Miocene age basalt flows occur within the sediments of this zone whilst the basalts of the Aden Series date from Pliocene to Holocene times, some being extruded at the time of a major phase of uplift and rifting during the Pleistocene.

== Economic geology ==
The country produces salt, gypsum and kaolin but also has resources of asbestos, baryte, potash and talc. Metal resources include copper, gold, iron ore, lead, zinc, silver and magnesium. There have been discoveries of high-grade polymetallic volcanogenic massive sulfide ore deposits in recent years. Most mineral production in the south of the country was eliminated due to tension from ongoing conflicts with Ethiopia. About 500 kg (1,100 lb) of gold was mined annually in the late 1990s.

In the Dallol depression, large quantities of Neogene evaporites can be found, including halites, gypsum, and potassium salt.
