= 1936 Lingshan earthquake =

1936 earthquake in southern China

- Location within China
- UTC time: 1936-04-01 02:31
- ISC event: n/a
- USGS-ANSS: n/a
- Local date: April 1, 1936
- Local time: 09:31
- Magnitude: M_{s} 6.75
- Depth: 7 km (4.3 mi)
- Epicenter: 22.5°N 109.4°E
- Fault: Lingshan Fault Zone
- Areas affected: Guangxi, China
- Max. intensity: CSIS IX
- Casualties: 92 dead, 200 injured

The 1936 Lingshan earthquake struck southern China's Guangxi (formerly part of Guangdong) on 1 April at 09:31 local time. It was the largest continental earthquake in southern China since historical records began. The earthquake had an estimated surface-wave magnitude of 6.75 and was associated with activity on the Fangcheng–Lingshan Fault Zone. At least 92 people were reported dead and over 5,800 homes were destroyed. Due to another earthquake occurring in Indonesia about five minutes prior, seismic records of this event are sparse.

== Earthquake ==
Two subparallel zones of northeast-trending surface ruptures were recorded totaling 12.5 km (7.8 mi). The longest of the two runs for 9.4 km (5.8 mi) and is characterised by 0.54–2.9 m (1 ft 9 in – 9 ft 6 in) of dextral slip and vertical offsets of 0.23–1.02 m (9.1 in – 3 ft 4.2 in). The eastern rupture zone measures 3.1 km (1.9 mi) while its dextral and vertical offsets were 0.36–1.3 m (1 ft 2 in – 4 ft 3 in) and 0.15–0.57 m (5.9 in – 1 ft 10.4 in), respectively. These surface ruptures appear as the fault expression, ground cracks, scarps, colluvial wedges, landslides and liquefaction.

The event was not included in the International Seismological Centre's catalog. About five minutes prior to the Lingshan earthquake, a M_{w} 7.7 earthquake struck the Talaud Islands. Signals from the larger earthquake compromised that of the Lingshan earthquake which led to a lack of reliable seismic data. There was also no local seismic observatories in China during this period. The earthquake's magnitude and epicenter were determined using an isoseismal map which assigned a maximum intensity of IX.

== Impact ==
The earthquake killed at least 92 people, injured 200 and demolished 5,800 homes in Lingshan and Hepu counties. Shaking was felt across 500,000 km^{2} (190,000 sq mi) and in parts of Hong Kong and Haiphong in Vietnam. In Lingshan, there was at least 58 deaths and 187 injured; over 5,100 homes and schools collapsed. A further 34 died in Hepu and 679 homes were destroyed. Villages along the northwestern base of Mount Luoyangshan suffered immense damage; some villages including Liue and Gaotang were completely or half-destroyed.

== See also ==
- List of earthquakes in 1936
- List of earthquakes in China
