= List of earthquakes in Brazil =

This is a list of earthquakes in Brazil. Only large earthquakes are included, unless they cause damage and/or casualties. Intensities is measured in the Mercalli intensity scale. Depths are given in kilometers.

== List of earthquakes ==
| Date | Location | M_{w} | MMI | Fatalities | Injuries | Depth | Notes | Ref. |
|---|---|---|---|---|---|---|---|---|
| 2025-04-03 | Pará | 4.7 | V | | | 10.0 | | |
| 2025-03-01 | Mato Grosso | 4.2 | IV | | | 10.0 | | |
| 2024-06-18 | Minas Gerais | 4.3 | V | | | 11.4 | Minor damage | |
| 2023-04-05 | Acre | 5.1 | II | | | 560.1 | | |
| 2022-06-08 | Acre | 6.5 | III | | | 622.7 | Objects swinging / Shaking lasting minutes | |
| 2020-08-30 | Bahia | 4.6 | VI | | | 10.0 | Minor damage | |
| 2019-01-05 | Acre | 6.8 | III | | | 570.4 | | |
| 2017-09-18 | Paraná | 4.5 | | | | 53.0 | Minor damage | |
| 2017-01-03 | Maranhão | 4.5 | V | | | 10.0 | Minor damage | |
| 2012-05-19 | Minas Gerais | 4.1 | VI | | | 10.0 | Six homes destroyed | |
| 2010-10-08 | Goiás | 5.0 | VI | | | 10.0 | Minor damage in Porangatu | |
| 2008-04-23 | São Paulo offshore | 5.2 | VI | 1 (indirect) | Unknown | 10.0 | Largest in state since 1922 / Hospital damaged / Most felt in São Paulo City | |
| 2008-02-29 | Ceará | 4.3 | | | | 10.0 | Minor damage | |
| 2007-12-09 | Minas Gerais | 4.9 | VI | 1 | 6 | 10.0 | Great damage | |
| 2003-06-20 | Acre | 7.1 | IV | | | 558.1 | | |
| 1989-03-26 | Rio Grande do Norte | 4.4 | VII | | | 10.0 | Minor damage | |
| 1989-03-10 | Rio Grande do Norte | 5.0 | VI | | | 10.0 | Minor damage | |
| 1986-11-30 | Rio Grande do Norte | 5.1 | VII | 1 | 200 + | 5.0 | 4,348 buildings damaged, more than 10,000 displaced | |
| 1983-08-05 | Amazonas | 5.6 | VII | | | 23.0 | Minor damage in Manaus | |
| 1980-11-20 | Ceará | 5.1 | VII | | | 10.0 | 488 houses damaged | |
| 1967-02-15 | Tarauacá | 7.0 | | | | 600.4 | | |
| 1963-11-09 | Tarauacá | 7.6 | | | | 590.7 | | |
| 1955-01-31 | Mato Grosso | 6.3 | | | | 15.0 | Rare event | |
| 1922-01-27 | São Paulo | 5.1 | VI | 1 | | Unknown | Buildings damaged | |
| 1690-06 | Amazonas | ~7.0 | IX | | ~ 300 | Unknown | Largest historical earthquake known in Brazil; epicenter estimated ~45 km downstream from modern Manaus on the Amazon River / Possible river tsunami | |
Note: The inclusion criteria for adding events are based on WikiProject Earthquakes' notability guideline that was developed for stand alone articles. The principles described also apply to lists. In summary, only damaging, injurious, or deadly events should be recorded.
