= List of earthquakes in 1924 =

Earthquakes in 1924
Approximate epicenters of notable earthquakes in 1924
- 4.0–5.9 magnitude
- 6.0–6.9 magnitude
- 7.0–7.9 magnitude
- 8.0+ magnitude
- Strongest: Philippines, Davao Gulf, Mindanao April 14 (Magnitude 8.0)
- Deadliest: Dutch East Indies, central Java December 2 727 deaths
- Total fatalities: 1,152

Number by magnitude
- 9.0+: 0

This is a list of earthquakes in 1924. Only magnitude 6.0 or greater earthquakes appear on the list. Lower magnitude events are included if they have caused death, injury or damage. Events which occurred in remote areas will be excluded from the list as they wouldn't have generated significant media interest. All dates are listed according to UTC time. Although it was still a fairly active year, the death toll in 1924 was substantially lower than in 1923. Dutch East Indies bore the brunt of the deadly quakes. Turkey, Algeria and China also had events which caused many deaths. Seismic activity remained high in Japan, and the Philippines and Russia saw many earthquakes as well.

== Overall ==
=== By death toll ===
Rank	Death toll	Magnitude	Location	MMI	Depth (km)	Date
1	727	0.0	Dutch East Indies, central Java	IX (Violent)	0.0	December 2
2	101	5.6	French Algeria, Batna Province	IX (Violent)	0.0	March 16
3	100	7.0	China, southern Xinjiang Province	( )	10.0	July 3
= 4	60	6.8	Turkey, Erzurum Province	X (Extreme)	15.0	September 13
= 4	60	0.0	Dutch East Indies, central Java	( )	0.0	November 12
5	50	5.3	Turkey, Agri Province	IX (Violent)	0.0	May 13
6	40	6.9	Ecuador, Chimborazo Province	( )	0.0	March 3
7	14	6.8	Japan, Saitama Prefecture, Honshu	( )	15.0	January 14

- Note: At least 10 casualties

=== By magnitude ===
Rank	Magnitude	Death toll	Location	MMI	Depth (km)	Date
1	8.0	0	Philippines, Davao Gulf, Mindanao	IX (Violent)	15.0	April 14
2	7.5	0	Australia, Macquarie Island	( )	10.0	June 26
= 3	7.2	0	Russian SFSR, Kuril Islands	( )	139.6	June 30
= 3	7.2	0	China, southern Xinjiang Province	( )	10.0	July 11
= 3	7.2	0	Afghanistan, Badakhshan Province	( )	179.4	October 13
= 4	7.1	0	Costa Rica, Cartago Province	( )	15.0	March 4
= 4	7.1	0	Fiji	( )	535.0	May 4
= 4	7.1	0	Australia, north of Macquarie Island	( )	15.0	July 24
= 4	7.1	0	Philippines, east of Mindanao	IX (Violent)	15.0	August 30
= 5	7.0	0	Fiji, south of	( )	350.0	January 16
= 5	7.0	0	Russian SFSR, Sea of Okhotsk	( )	431.8	May 28
= 5	7.0	100	China, southern Xinjiang Province	( )	10.0	July 3
= 5	7.0	0	Japan, off the east coast of Honshu	( )	15.0	August 14
= 5	7.0	0	Russian SFSR, Kuril Islands	( )	35.0	December 27
= 5	7.0	0	Russian SFSR, Kuril Islands	( )	35.0	December 28

- Note: At least 7.0 magnitude

== Notable events ==
=== January ===
January
- Strongest: 7.0 M_{w} Fiji
- Deadliest: 6.8 M_{w} Japan; 14 deaths
- Total fatalities: 14

Number by magnitude
- 8.0–8.9: 0
- 7.0–7.9: 1
- 6.0–6.9: 4

Date	Country and location	M_{w}	Depth (km)	MMI	Notes	Casualties	
Date	Country and location	M_{w}	Depth (km)	MMI	Notes	Dead	Injured
14	Japan, Saitama Prefecture, Honshu	6.8	15.0		Possible aftershock of the 1923 Great Kantō earthquake. 14 deaths were caused as well as damage in the area.	14	
16	Fiji	7.0	350.0				
21	Russian SFSR, Sea of Okhotsk	6.8	35.0				
29	Chile, Atacama Region	6.7	45.0				
30	United States, southwest of Guam	6.2	35.0				

=== February ===
February
- Strongest: 6.6 M_{w} Dutch East Indies
- Total fatalities: 0

Number by magnitude
- 8.0–8.9: 0
- 7.0–7.9: 0
- 6.0–6.9: 2

Date	Country and location	M_{w}	Depth (km)	MMI	Notes	Casualties	
Date	Country and location	M_{w}	Depth (km)	MMI	Notes	Dead	Injured
13	Dutch East Indies, Southeast Peninsula, Sulawesi	6.6	35.0				
18	British Cyprus, southeast of	6.0	35.0				

=== March ===
March
- Strongest: 7.1 M_{w} Costa Rica
- Deadliest: 5.6 M_{w} French Algeria; 101+ deaths
- Total fatalities: 141+

Number by magnitude
- 8.0–8.9: 0
- 7.0–7.9: 1
- 6.0–6.9: 5
- 5.0–5.9: 1

Date	Country and location	M_{w}	Depth (km)	MMI	Notes	Casualties	
Date	Country and location	M_{w}	Depth (km)	MMI	Notes	Dead	Injured
3	Ecuador, Chimborazo Province	6.9	0.0		40 deaths were reported and some damage was caused. Depth unknown.	40	
4	Costa Rica, Cartago Province	7.1	15.0				
5	Dutch East Indies, Banda Sea	6.6	143.4				
11	Costa Rica, Puntarenas Province	6.4	20.0				
11	Peru, off the north coast	6.6	35.0				
15	Russian SFSR, central Sakhalin	6.8	15.0				
16	French Algeria, Batna Province	5.6	0.0	IX	At least 101 people were killed. The depth was unknown.	101+	

=== April ===
April
- Strongest: 8.0 M_{w} Philippines

Number by magnitude
- 8.0–8.9: 1
- 7.0–7.9: 0
- 6.0–6.9: 3

Date	Country and location	M_{w}	Depth (km)	MMI	Notes	Casualties	
Date	Country and location	M_{w}	Depth (km)	MMI	Notes	Dead	Injured
13	Dutch East Indies, eastern Kalimantan	6.2	35.0				
14	Philippines, Davao Gulf, Mindanao	8.0	15.0	IX			
20	Yemen, off the coast of	6.2	35.0				
21	Mexico, Michoacan	6.4	15.0				

=== May ===
May
- Strongest: 7.1 M_{w} Fiji
- Deadliest: 5.3 M_{w} Turkey; 50 deaths
- Total fatalities: 50

Number by magnitude
- 8.0–8.9: 0
- 7.0–7.9: 2
- 6.0–6.9: 3
- 5.0–5.9: 1

Date	Country and location	M_{w}	Depth (km)	MMI	Notes	Casualties	
Date	Country and location	M_{w}	Depth (km)	MMI	Notes	Dead	Injured
1	El Salvador, off the coast	6.6	20.0				
4	Fiji	7.1	535.0				
6	Philippines, west of Luzon	6.7	15.0		A tsunami caused minor damage in the area.		
13	Turkey, Agri Province	5.3	0.0	IX	50 people were killed and many homes were destroyed.	50	
17	Dutch East Indies, West Papua (province)	6.3	15.0				
28	Russian SFSR, southwest Sea of Okhotsk	7.0	431.8				

=== June ===
June
- Strongest: 7.5 M_{w} Australia
- Total fatalities: 0

Number by magnitude
- 8.0–8.9: 0
- 7.0–7.9: 2
- 6.0–6.9: 2

Date	Country and location	M_{w}	Depth (km)	MMI	Notes	Casualties	
Date	Country and location	M_{w}	Depth (km)	MMI	Notes	Dead	Injured
22	Dutch East Indies, western Java	6.0	100.0				
22	Colombia, off the west coast	6.5	60.0				
26	Australia, Macquarie Island	7.5	10.0				
30	Russian SFSR, Kuril Islands	7.2	139.6				

=== July ===
July
- Strongest: 7.2 M_{w} China
- Deadliest: 7.0 M_{w} China; 100 deaths
- Total fatalities: 100

Number by magnitude
- 8.0–8.9: 0
- 7.0–7.9: 3
- 6.0–6.9: 6

Date	Country and location	M_{w}	Depth (km)	MMI	Notes	Casualties	
Date	Country and location	M_{w}	Depth (km)	MMI	Notes	Dead	Injured
3	China, southern Xinjiang Province	7.0	10.0		100 people were killed. Landslides occurred and some homes were destroyed.	100	
6	Colombia, Choco Department	6.4	20.0				
6	Turkestan ASSR, Osh Region	6.5	25.0				
11	China, southern Xinjiang Province	7.2	10.0				
12	Turkestan ASSR, Osh Region	6.6	25.0				
22	Ecuador, Guayas Province	6.5	250.0				
22	Taiwan, east of	6.8	35.0				
24	Australia, north of Macquarie Island	7.1	15.0				
29	Dutch East Indies, South-east Peninsula, Sulawesi	6.5	35.0				

=== August ===
August
- Strongest: 7.1 M_{w} Philippines
- Total fatalities: 0

Number by magnitude
- 8.0–8.9: 0
- 7.0–7.9: 2
- 6.0–6.9: 7

Date	Country and location	M_{w}	Depth (km)	MMI	Notes	Casualties	
Date	Country and location	M_{w}	Depth (km)	MMI	Notes	Dead	Injured
6	Japan, Ibaraki Prefecture, Honshu	6.5	75.0				
10	New Zealand, Kermadec Islands	6.5	15.0				
14	Japan, off the east coast of Honshu	7.0	15.0				
14	Japan, off the east coast of Honshu	6.3	10.0		Aftershock.		
17	Japan, off the east coast of Honshu	6.2	10.0		Aftershock.		
17	Japan, off the east coast of Honshu	6.6	35.0		Aftershock.		
25	Japan, off the east coast of Honshu	6.4	25.0		Aftershock.		
28	Japan, Oita Prefecture, Kyushu	6.0	35.0				
30	Philippines, east of Mindanao	7.1	15.0	IX	Some homes were destroyed and landslides were observed.		

=== September ===
September
- Strongest: 6.8 M_{w} Turkey
- Deadliest: 6.8 M_{w} Turkey; 60 deaths
- Total fatalities: 60

Number by magnitude
- 8.0–8.9: 0
- 7.0–7.9: 0
- 6.0–6.9: 6

Date	Country and location	M_{w}	Depth (km)	MMI	Notes	Casualties	
Date	Country and location	M_{w}	Depth (km)	MMI	Notes	Dead	Injured
10	Dutch East Indies, Flores Sea	6.5	200.0				
13	Turkey, Erzurum Province	6.8	15.0	X	The 1924 Pasinler earthquake resulted in 60 deaths. 380 homes were destroyed.	60	
14	United States, Rat Islands, Alaska	6.6	25.0				
14	Philippines, northeast of Mindanao	6.4	15.0				
16	Turkestan ASSR, Districts of Republican Subordination	6.2	35.0				
18	Japan, Ibaraki Prefecture, Honshu	6.6	35.0				

=== October ===
October
- Strongest: 7.2 M_{w} Afghanistan
- Total fatalities: 0

Number by magnitude
- 8.0–8.9: 0
- 7.0–7.9: 1
- 6.0–6.9: 4

Date	Country and location	M_{w}	Depth (km)	MMI	Notes	Casualties	
Date	Country and location	M_{w}	Depth (km)	MMI	Notes	Dead	Injured
8	China, western Xizang Province	6.5	15.0				
13	Afghanistan, Badakhshan Province	7.2	179.4				
18	Colombia, off the west coast	6.6	15.0				
20	Russian SFSR, Commander Islands	6.6	25.0				
27	Philippines, Mindanao	6.2	20.0				

=== November ===
November
- Strongest: 6.7 M_{w} Japan
- Deadliest: 0.0 M_{w} Dutch East Indies; 60 deaths
- Total fatalities: 60

Number by magnitude
- 8.0–8.9: 0
- 7.0–7.9: 0
- 6.0–6.9: 1

Date	Country and location	M_{w}	Depth (km)	MMI	Notes	Casualties	
Date	Country and location	M_{w}	Depth (km)	MMI	Notes	Dead	Injured
12	Dutch East Indies, central Java	0.0	0.0		Main article: 1924 Java earthquake	60	
25	Japan, Hokkaido	6.7	300.0				

=== December ===
December
- Strongest: 7.0 M_{w} Russian SFSR 2 events
- Deadliest: 0.0 M_{w} Dutch East Indies; 727 deaths
- Total fatalities: 727

Number by magnitude
- 8.0–8.9: 0
- 7.0–7.9: 2
- 6.0–6.9: 4

Date	Country and location	M_{w}	Depth (km)	MMI	Notes	Casualties	
Date	Country and location	M_{w}	Depth (km)	MMI	Notes	Dead	Injured
2	Dutch East Indies, central Java	0.0	0.0	IX	Main article: 1924 Java earthquake	727	
5	Dutch East Indies, northern Molucca Sea	6.5	200.0				
9	New Guinea, Gulf of Papua	6.2	15.0				
14	Argentina, San Luis Province	6.3	33.0				
15	New Hebrides	6.5	210.0				
27	Russian SFSR, Kuril Islands	7.0	35.0				
28	Russian SFSR, Kuril Islands	7.0	35.0				
