= 1936 Jirisan earthquake =

Earthquake in Korea

- Location within South Korea
- UTC time: 1936-07-03 21:02:23
- ISC event: 903729
- Local date: July 4, 1936
- Local time: 04:02:23 KST
- Magnitude: M_{w} 5.3 (USGS); M_{L} 5.0 (KMA)
- Depth: 10 kilometers (6.2 mi)
- Epicenter: 35°12′N 127°36′E
- Type: Strike-slip
- Areas affected: Korea under Japanese rule
- Tsunami: No
- Landslides: No
- Casualties: 9 dead, 17 injured

The 1936 Jirisan earthquake occurred on July 4 near Jirisan in Korea. Nine people died in the earthquake while 17 others were injured.
