= List of earthquakes in 1915 =

Earthquakes in 1915
Approximate epicenters of the earthquakes in 1915
- 4.0–5.9 magnitude
- 6.0–6.9 magnitude
- 7.0–7.9 magnitude
- 8.0+ magnitude
- Strongest magnitude: Russia, Kuril Islands May 1 (Magnitude 7.8)
- Deadliest: Italy, Avezzano, January 13 (Magnitude 6.7) 29,978 deaths
- Total fatalities: 30,155+

Number by magnitude
- 9.0+: 0

This is a list of earthquakes in 1915. Only magnitude 6.0 or greater earthquakes appear on the list. Lower magnitude events are included if they have caused death, injury or damage. Events which occurred in remote areas will be excluded from the list as they wouldn't have generated significant media interest. All dates are listed according to UTC time. In January a major earthquake struck Italy causing 30,000 deaths. There were also many earthquakes in Japan and the Kuril Islands during this year.

== Overall ==
=== By death toll ===
Rank	Death toll	Magnitude	Location	MMI	Depth (km)	Date
1	29,978	6.7	Italy, Abruzzo	XI (Extreme)	15.0	January 13
2	170	6.5	Bhutan, India, Bhutan, Arunachal Pradesh border	IX (Violent)	15.0	December 3

- Note: At least 10 casualties

=== By magnitude ===
Rank	Magnitude	Death toll	Location	MMI	Depth (km)	Date
1	7.8	0	Russia, Kuril Islands	( )	30.0	May 1
2	7.4	0	El Salvador, Chalatenango Department	( )	80.0	September 7
= 3	7.3	0	Vanuatu	( )	200.0	January 5
= 3	7.3	0	Japan, southwestern Ryukyu Islands	( )	150.0	January 5
= 3	7.3	0	Japan, southwestern Ryukyu Islands	( )	20.0	February 28
= 3	7.3	0	Bolivia, Oruro Department	( )	160.0	June 6
= 3	7.3	0	Russia, off the east coast of Kamchatka	X (Extreme)	20.0	July 31
4	7.2	0	Japan, Hokkaido	( )	35.0	March 17
= 5	7.1	0	Fiji	( )	600.0	February 25
= 5	7.1	0	Russia, east of the Kuril Islands	( )	0.0	August 6
= 5	7.1	0	Mexico, border of Baja California and Sonora	( )	0.0	November 21
= 6	7.0	0	Japan, Izu Islands	( )	200.0	October 8
= 6	7.0	0	Japan, off the east coast of Honshu	( )	30.0	November 1
= 6	7.0	0	Japan, off the east coast of Honshu	( )	35.0	November 1
= 6	7.0	0	Japan, off the east coast of Honshu	( )	35.0	November 18

- Note: At least 7.0 magnitude

== Notable events ==
=== January ===
January
- Strongest magnitude: 7.3 M_{w} 2 events
- Deadliest: 6.7 M_{w} Italy; 29,978 deaths
- Total fatalities: 29,978

Number by magnitude
- 8.0–8.9: 0
- 7.0–7.9: 2
- 6.0–6.9: 1

Date	Country and location	M_{w}	Depth (km)	MMI	Notes	Casualties	
Date	Country and location	M_{w}	Depth (km)	MMI	Notes	Dead	Injured
5	New Hebrides	7.3	200.0				
5	Japan, southwest Ryukyu Islands	7.3	150.0				
13	Italy, Abruzzo	6.7	15.0	XI	The 1915 Avezzano earthquake caused major damage to the region. In total around 29,978 people were killed. Costs of damage were $60 million (1915 rate).	29,978	

=== February ===
February
- Strongest magnitude: 7.3 M_{w} Japan
- Total fatalities: 0

Number by magnitude
- 8.0–8.9: 0
- 7.0–7.9: 2
- 6.0–6.9: 0

Date	Country and location	M_{w}	Depth (km)	MMI	Notes	Casualties	
Date	Country and location	M_{w}	Depth (km)	MMI	Notes	Dead	Injured
25	Fiji	7.1	600.0				
28	Japan, southwest Ryukyu Islands	7.3	20.0				

=== March ===
March
- Strongest magnitude: 7.2 M_{w} Japan
- Total fatalities: 0

Number by magnitude
- 8.0–8.9: 0
- 7.0–7.9: 1
- 6.0–6.9: 2

Date	Country and location	M_{w}	Depth (km)	MMI	Notes	Casualties	
Date	Country and location	M_{w}	Depth (km)	MMI	Notes	Dead	Injured
8	Japan, off the east coast of Honshu	6.8	0.0		Depth unknown.		
12	Philippines, eastern Masbate Island	6.6	40.0				
17	Japan, south of Hokkaido	7.2	35.0				

=== April ===
April
- Strongest magnitude: 6.9 M_{w} Brazil
- Total fatalities: 0

Number by magnitude
- 8.0–8.9: 0
- 7.0–7.9: 0
- 6.0–6.9: 2

Date	Country and location	M_{w}	Depth (km)	MMI	Notes	Casualties	
Date	Country and location	M_{w}	Depth (km)	MMI	Notes	Dead	Injured
23	Brazil, Amazonas (Brazilian state)	6.9	650.0				
30	Mongolia, Bayankhongor Province	6.5	35.0				

=== May ===
May
- Strongest magnitude: 7.8 M_{w} Russia
- Total fatalities: 0

Number by magnitude
- 8.0–8.9: 0
- 7.0–7.9: 1
- 6.0–6.9: 2

Date	Country and location	M_{w}	Depth (km)	MMI	Notes	Casualties	
Date	Country and location	M_{w}	Depth (km)	MMI	Notes	Dead	Injured
1	Russia, Kuril Islands	7.8	30.0				
8	Mozambique Channel	6.6	0.0		Depth unknown.		
21	Anglo-Egyptian Sudan, Lakes (state)	6.6	35.0				

=== June ===
June
- Strongest magnitude: 7.3 M_{w} Bolivia
- Deadliest: 6.3 M_{w} United States; 6 deaths
- Total fatalities: 6

Number by magnitude
- 8.0–8.9: 0
- 7.0–7.9: 1
- 6.0–6.9: 4

Date	Country and location	M_{w}	Depth (km)	MMI	Notes	Casualties	
Date	Country and location	M_{w}	Depth (km)	MMI	Notes	Dead	Injured
4	Japan, off the east coast of Honshu	6.7	35.0				
6	Bolivia, Oruro Department	7.3	160.0				
23	United States, Imperial Valley, California	6.1	0.0	rowspan="2"|The 1915 Imperial Valley earthquakes are an example of a doublet earthquake. Both events were within an hour of each other. 6 people were killed and damage costs of $900,000 (1915 rate) were reported. Depth unknown.	6		
23	United States, Imperial Valley, California	6.3	0.0				
27	Russia, Kuril Islands	6.5	35.0				

=== July ===
July
- Strongest magnitude: 7.3 M_{w} Russia
- Total fatalities: 0

Number by magnitude
- 8.0–8.9: 0
- 7.0–7.9: 1
- 6.0–6.9: 1

Date	Country and location	M_{w}	Depth (km)	MMI	Notes	Casualties	
Date	Country and location	M_{w}	Depth (km)	MMI	Notes	Dead	Injured
7	Italy, Tyrrhenian Sea	6.0	300.0				
31	Russia, off the east coast of Kamchatka	7.3	20.0	X			

=== August ===
August
- Strongest magnitude: 7.1 M_{w} Russia
- Total fatalities: 0

Number by magnitude
- 8.0–8.9: 0
- 7.0–7.9: 1
- 6.0–6.9: 3

Date	Country and location	M_{w}	Depth (km)	MMI	Notes	Casualties	
Date	Country and location	M_{w}	Depth (km)	MMI	Notes	Dead	Injured
6	Russia, east of the Kuril Islands	7.1	0.0		Depth unknown.		
7	Greece, Ionian Sea	6.7	14.0	IX	Major damage was caused. Many homes were destroyed or damaged.		
12	Dutch East Indies, Sulawesi	6.6	60.0				
12	India, Nicobar Islands	6.2	35.0				

=== September ===
September
- Strongest magnitude: 7.4 M_{w} El Salvador
- Total fatalities: 0

Number by magnitude
- 8.0–8.9: 0
- 7.0–7.9: 1
- 6.0–6.9: 2

Date	Country and location	M_{w}	Depth (km)	MMI	Notes	Casualties	
Date	Country and location	M_{w}	Depth (km)	MMI	Notes	Dead	Injured
7	El Salvador, Chalatenango Department	7.4	80.0				
11	Philippines, Celebes Sea	6.6	600.0				
23	Italian Eritrea, Southern Region (Eritrea)	6.2	10.0		1915 Asmara earthquake.		

=== October ===
October
- Strongest magnitude: 7.0 M_{w} Japan
- Total fatalities: 0

Number by magnitude
- 8.0–8.9: 0
- 7.0–7.9: 1
- 6.0–6.9: 3

Date	Country and location	M_{w}	Depth (km)	MMI	Notes	Casualties	
Date	Country and location	M_{w}	Depth (km)	MMI	Notes	Dead	Injured
3	United States, north central Nevada	6.8	10.0	X	The 1915 Pleasant Valley earthquake caused some damage.		
8	Japan, Izu Islands	7.0	200.0				
11	United States, north of Puerto Rico	6.6	0.0		Depth unknown.		
12	Japan, off the east coast of Honshu	6.8	35.0				

=== November ===
November
- Strongest magnitude: 7.1 M_{w} Mexico
- Total fatalities: 0

Number by magnitude
- 8.0–8.9: 0
- 7.0–7.9: 4
- 6.0–6.9: 3

Date	Country and location	M_{w}	Depth (km)	MMI	Notes	Casualties	
Date	Country and location	M_{w}	Depth (km)	MMI	Notes	Dead	Injured
1	Japan, off the east coast of Honshu	7.0	30.0		Some damage was reported.		
1	Japan, off the east coast of Honshu	6.7	35.0		Aftershock.		
1	Japan, off the east coast of Honshu	7.0	35.0				
6	Dutch East Indies, Biak	6.0	0.0		Depth unknown.		
18	Japan, off the east coast of Honshu	7.0	35.0				
18	Philippines, off the west coast of Luzon	6.4	0.0	VIII	A few homes were damaged. Depth unknown.		
21	Mexico, border of Baja California and Sonora	7.1	0.0		Depth unknown.		

=== December ===
December
- Strongest magnitude: 6.6 M_{w} Honduras
- Deadliest: 6.5 M_{w} Bhutan, India; 170 deaths
- Total fatalities: 171+

Number by magnitude
- 8.0–8.9: 0
- 7.0–7.9: 0
- 6.0–6.9: 4

Date	Country and location	M_{w}	Depth (km)	MMI	Notes	Casualties	
Date	Country and location	M_{w}	Depth (km)	MMI	Notes	Dead	Injured
3	Bhutan, India, border of Bhutan and Arunachal Pradesh	6.5	15.0	IX	170 deaths were caused and many homes were destroyed.	170	
6	Japan, off the east coast of Honshu	6.5	35.0		Aftershock.		
17	China, Xinjiang Province	6.5	20.0				
29	Honduras, Ocotepeque Department	6.6	0.0		At least 1 person was killed and many homes were destroyed. Depth unknown.	1+	
