= 1913 Sulawesi–Mindanao earthquake =

Earthquake in Southeast Asia

- Location within Southeast Asia
- UTC time: 1913-03-14 08:45:05
- ISC event: 914043
- USGS-ANSS: ComCat
- Local date: March 14, 1913
- Local time
- Magnitude: M_{w} 7.9
- Depth: 15 km (9 mi)
- Epicenter: 5.544°N 125.891°E
- Max. intensity: MMI IX (Violent)
- Casualties: 138 fatalities

A M_{w} 7.9 earthquake struck offshore between Mindanao and Sulawesi on 14 March 1913. It had a maximum Modified Mercalli intensity of IX (Violent). The majority of the 138 fatalities from the earthquake took place on Sangihe Island, where a mudflow occurred.

== Earthquake ==
The M_{w} 7.9 mainshock was preceded by foreshocks. The mainshock had a maximum Modified Mercalli intensity (MMI) of IX (Violent) in Davao and Sarangani. MMI VIII (Severe) was observed in Talacogon; MMI VII (Very strong) was observed in Cotabato, Baganga, Butuan, Cabadbaran and Tandag.

== Damage and casualties ==
=== Indonesia ===
On Sangihe Island, where the earthquake produced about four minutes of strong shaking, people were thrown to the ground, and there were 20 deaths. Homes located on the swamp were raised from the ground and tilted on their sides or collapsed. Many buildings including schools, homes and businesses in Enemawira, Peta, Tabukan and Tamako, collapsed. Severe damage was also reported at Manganitu and Kendahe. Rockfalls were widespread along the rocky coastline while fractures appeared in the ground, some ejected water. Subsidence occurred in the Menalu area; the sea inundated parts of the plain, forcing residents to relocate. Coastal subsidence also occurred at Peta Bay, Tamako and Tabukan. At Menalu Bay, 1,000 m^{3} (35,000 cu ft) of material fell into the water from 80 m (260 ft) height. West of that, a mudflow traveled 1 km (0.62 mi) down from Endongo Hill, burying 117 villagers and 29 houses. The mudflow buried the area under 6 m (20 ft) of material; it subsequently dammed a river, causing it to overflow. In Manganitu, bridges were washed away.

On Siau Island, one person died and several were injured. Ground fractures, avalanches and rockfalls occurred but there was no coastal subsidence. During the earthquake, people were unable to stand. Many brick buildings were ruined and some huts sank to one side. Similar environmental effects and damage occurred on the Talaud Islands but there were no casualties.

=== Philippines ===
Shaking lasted half a minute on the Sarangani Islands, where many trees toppled. At Davao, strong oscillations were recorded for two to five minutes; people in the city were thrown to the ground. Huts made from palm leaves sank on their side and some stone walls collapsed, and cracks in the ground ejected sand and water. Along the Agusan River, the water moved in an east–west direction, tossing boats. The earthquake was also felt in Baganga, Talakogon, Kotabato, Butuan, Bohol, Cebu and Leyte.

== Volcanic eruption ==
The Straits Times and Malay Mail reported a volcanic eruption at Mount Awu. It occurred at the same time as the mudflow at Endongo Hill. A "tidal wave" 15 m (49 ft) high devastated the coastline. The eruption measured 2 on the volcanic explosivity index.

== See also ==
- List of earthquakes in 1913
- List of earthquakes in the Philippines
- List of earthquakes in Indonesia
