= Aswa Dislocation =

Shear zone in East Africa

Location of the Aswa Dislocation

The Aswa Dislocation, also called the Aswa mylonite belt, Aswa Lineament or Aswa Shear Zone, is a north-west trending ductile shear zone that runs to the east of Lake Victoria in East Africa.

== Extent ==
The lineament dates to the Precambrian era and thus is much older than the East African Rift System. It probably extends northwest to Darfur in Sudan, perhaps along the Abu Gabra Rift, and perhaps southeast to the Lindi fault zone on the Indian Ocean coast, passing through the Kilimanjaro and Elgon volcanic centers.

== Connection to the East African rift system ==
The fault seems to have been partly reactivated during the Neogene in the section between the Albertine and Gregory rifts, and along its southern extension towards the Indian Ocean. The reactivated section of the Aswa lineament connects the eastern and western branches of the East African rift system. It seems also to truncate the Nyanza rift, which extends ENE from Lake Victoria. The section of the Aswa Dislocation between the two rifts forms part of the boundary between the Somali plate and the African plate.
