= List of earthquakes in 1913 =

Earthquakes in 1913
Approximate epicenters of the earthquakes in 1913
- 4.0–5.9 magnitude
- 6.0–6.9 magnitude
- 7.0–7.9 magnitude
- 8.0+ magnitude
- Strongest magnitude: Philippines, south of Mindanao March 14 (Magnitude 7.8)
- Deadliest: China, Yunnan Province December 21 (Magnitude 6.7) 942 deaths
- Total fatalities: 1,445

Number by magnitude
- 9.0+: 0

This is a list of earthquakes in 1913. Only magnitude 6.0 or greater earthquakes appear on the list. Lower magnitude events are included if they have caused death, injury or damage. Events which occurred in remote areas will be excluded from the list as they wouldn't have generated significant media interest. All dates are listed according to UTC time. A fairly busy year with activity clustered around Japan, the Philippines, Peru and the southwest Pacific Islands. The deadliest quake of the year struck China with over 940 of the total deaths in December. Peru, the Philippines and Ecuador contributed to the death toll with destructive events. In March, the Philippines had the years largest event which measured 7.8.

== Overall ==
=== By death toll ===
Rank	Death toll	Magnitude	Location	MMI	Depth (km)	Date
1	942	6.7	China, Yunnan Province	IX (Violent)	15.0	December 21
2	150	6.3	Peru, Apurimac Region	X (Extreme)	10.0	November 4
3	138	7.8	Philippines, south of Mindanao	IX (Violent)	15.0	March 14
4	101	7.7	Ecuador, El Oro Province	VII (Very strong)	50.0	February 24
= 5	51	7.7	Peru, off the south coast of	X (Extreme)	25.0	August 6
= 5	51	6.0	China, Sichuan Province	VIII (Severe)	0.0	August 31
6	11	5.8	Iran, Hormozgan Province	( )	0.0	March 24

- Note: At least 10 casualties

=== By magnitude ===
Rank	Magnitude	Death toll	Location	MMI	Depth (km)	Date
1	7.8	138	Philippines, south of Mindanao	IX (Violent)	15.0	March 14
= 2	7.7	101	Ecuador, El Oro Province	VII (Very strong)	50.0	February 24
= 2	7.7	0	Tonga	( )	25.0	June 26
= 2	7.7	51	Peru, off the south coast of	X (Extreme)	25.0	August 6
3	7.6	0	New Hebrides	( )	230.0	October 14
4	7.3	0	Dutch East Indies, southern Sumatra	( )	75.0	August 13
= 5	7.2	0	Dutch East Indies, north of Minahasa Peninsula, Sulawesi	( )	0.0	January 11
= 5	7.2	0	Japan, Volcano Islands	( )	80.0	March 23
= 5	7.2	0	Philippines, east of Mindanao	( )	0.0	April 25
= 5	7.2	0	German New Guinea, East New Britain Province	( )	15.0	May 30
= 5	7.2	0	New Hebrides	( )	80.0	November 10
6	7.1	0	France, southeast of Loyalty Islands, New Caledonia	( )	150.0	November 15
= 7	7.0	0	Japan, off the east coast of Honshu	( )	0.0	February 20
= 7	7.0	0	(German Empire) Northern Mariana Islands, northeast of Rota (island)	( )	0.0	May 18
= 7	7.0	0	United States, south of the Andreanof Islands, Alaska	( )	0.0	June 22
= 7	7.0	0	Peru, off the south coast of	IX (Violent)	0.0	July 28
= 7	7.0	0	New Guinea, off the east coast of mainland	( )	0.0	October 11

- Note: At least 7.0 magnitude

== Notable events ==
=== January ===
January
- Strongest magnitude: 7.2 M_{w} Dutch East Indies
- Total fatalities: 0

Number by magnitude
- 8.0–8.9: 0
- 7.0–7.9: 1
- 6.0–6.9: 3

Date	Country and location	M_{w}	Depth (km)	MMI	Notes	Casualties	
Date	Country and location	M_{w}	Depth (km)	MMI	Notes	Dead	Injured
7	Taiwan, off the east coast	6.7	0.0		Depth unknown.		
8	Taiwan, off the east coast	6.5	0.0		Aftershock. Depth unknown.		
11	Dutch East Indies, north of the Minahasa Peninsula, Sulawesi	7.2	0.0		Depth unknown.		
19	Russia, Kuril Islands	6.9	150.0		Some damage was caused.		

=== February ===
February
- Strongest magnitude: 7.7 M_{w} Ecuador
- Deadliest: 7.7 M_{w} Ecuador; 101+ deaths
- Total fatalities: 101+

Number by magnitude
- 8.0–8.9: 0
- 7.0–7.9: 2
- 6.0–6.9: 2

Date	Country and location	M_{w}	Depth (km)	MMI	Notes	Casualties	
Date	Country and location	M_{w}	Depth (km)	MMI	Notes	Dead	Injured
14	British Solomon Islands	6.6	100.0				
20	Japan, off the east coast of Honshu	7.0	0.0		Depth unknown.		
22	New Zealand, Westport, New Zealand	6.8	33.0	VIII	A few homes were destroyed.		
24	Ecuador, El Oro Province	7.7	50.0	VII	At least 101 people were killed and many homes were destroyed.	101+	

=== March ===
March
- Strongest magnitude: 7.8 M_{w} Philippines
- Deadliest: 7.8 M_{w} Philippines; 138 deaths
- Total fatalities: 149

Number by magnitude
- 8.0–8.9: 0
- 7.0–7.9: 2
- 6.0–6.9: 4
- 5.0–5.9: 1

Date	Country and location	M_{w}	Depth (km)	MMI	Notes	Casualties	
Date	Country and location	M_{w}	Depth (km)	MMI	Notes	Dead	Injured
3	Japan, Ryukyu Islands	6.6	150.0				
6	China, Xizang Province	6.2	35.0				
6	China, Xizang Province	6.4	35.0				
14	Philippines, south of Mindanao	7.8	15.0	IX	The 1913 Sulawesi–Mindanao earthquake killed 138 people and at least 51 were injured. Many homes were destroyed. Changes to the terrain were recorded.	138	51+
23	Japan, Volcano Islands	7.1	80.0				
24	Iran, Hormozgan Province	5.8	0.0		11 people died.	11	
31	United States, Andreanof Islands, Alaska	6.7	60.0				

=== April ===
April
- Strongest magnitude: 7.2 M_{w} Philippines
- Total fatalities: 0

Number by magnitude
- 8.0–8.9: 0
- 7.0–7.9: 1
- 6.0–6.9: 2

Date	Country and location	M_{w}	Depth (km)	MMI	Notes	Casualties	
Date	Country and location	M_{w}	Depth (km)	MMI	Notes	Dead	Injured
2	Japan, east of Kyushu	6.7	35.0				
13	Japan, east of Kyushu	6.6	35.0				
25	Philippines, east of Mindanao	7.2	0.0		Depth unknown.		

=== May ===
May
- Strongest magnitude: 7.2 M_{w} German New Guinea
- Total fatalities: 0

Number by magnitude
- 8.0–8.9: 0
- 7.0–7.9: 2
- 6.0–6.9: 1

Date	Country and location	M_{w}	Depth (km)	MMI	Notes	Casualties	
Date	Country and location	M_{w}	Depth (km)	MMI	Notes	Dead	Injured
8	Tonga	6.9	200.0				
18	(German Empire) Northern Mariana Islands, northeast of Rota (island)	7.0	0.0		Depth unknown.		
30	German New Guinea, East New Britain Province	7.2	15.0				

=== June ===
June
- Strongest magnitude: 7.7 M_{w} Tonga
- Total fatalities: 0

Number by magnitude
- 8.0–8.9: 0
- 7.0–7.9: 2
- 6.0–6.9: 2

Date	Country and location	M_{w}	Depth (km)	MMI	Notes	Casualties	
Date	Country and location	M_{w}	Depth (km)	MMI	Notes	Dead	Injured
4	German New Guinea, east of Mussau Island	6.8	0.0		Depth unknown.		
14	Bulgaria, Ruse Province	6.6	15.0	XI			
22	United States, south of the Andreanof Islands	7.0	0.0		Depth unknown.		
26	Tonga	7.7	25.0				

=== July ===
July
- Strongest magnitude: 7.0 M_{w} Peru
- Total fatalities: 0

Number by magnitude
- 8.0–8.9: 0
- 7.0–7.9: 1
- 6.0–6.9: 1

Date	Country and location	M_{w}	Depth (km)	MMI	Notes	Casualties	
Date	Country and location	M_{w}	Depth (km)	MMI	Notes	Dead	Injured
25	Nicaragua, off the east coast	6.3	35.0				
28	Peru, off the south coast	7.0	0.0	IX	Some damage was caused. Depth unknown.		

=== August ===
August
- Strongest magnitude: 7.7 M_{w} Peru
- Deadliest: 2 events each caused 51+ deaths
- Total fatalities: 102+

Number by magnitude
- 8.0–8.9: 0
- 7.0–7.9: 2
- 6.0–6.9: 2

Date	Country and location	M_{w}	Depth (km)	MMI	Notes	Casualties	
Date	Country and location	M_{w}	Depth (km)	MMI	Notes	Dead	Injured
1	Russia, east of the Kuril Islands	6.9	15.0				
6	Peru, off the south coast	7.7	25.0	X	At least 51 people were killed. Many homes were damaged or destroyed. Caraveli was destroyed.	51+	
13	Dutch East Indies, southern Sumatra	7.3	75.0				
31	China, Sichuan Province	6.0	0.0	VIII	At least 51 people were killed and some homes were destroyed. The date and depth of the event were unknown.	51+	

=== September ===
September
- Strongest magnitude: 6.2 M_{w} Ethiopian Empire
- Total fatalities: 0

Number by magnitude
- 8.0–8.9: 0
- 7.0–7.9: 0
- 6.0–6.9: 1

Date	Country and location	M_{w}	Depth (km)	MMI	Notes	Casualties	
Date	Country and location	M_{w}	Depth (km)	MMI	Notes	Dead	Injured
16	Ethiopian Empire, Debub Omo Zone	6.2	35.0				

=== October ===
October
- Strongest magnitude: 7.6 M_{w} New Hebrides
- Deadliest: 6.7 M_{w} Panama; 1+ deaths
- Total fatalities: 1+

Number by magnitude
- 8.0–8.9: 0
- 7.0–7.9: 2
- 6.0–6.9: 3

Date	Country and location	M_{w}	Depth (km)	MMI	Notes	Casualties	
Date	Country and location	M_{w}	Depth (km)	MMI	Notes	Dead	Injured
2	Panama, off the south coast	6.7	0.0		At least 1 person was killed. A few homes were destroyed while many more were damaged.	1+	
11	German New Guinea, off the east coast of mainland	7.0	0.0		Depth unknown.		
11	Japan, off the east coast of Honshu	6.9	35.0				
12	Japan, off the east coast of Honshu	6.6	35.0				
14	New Hebrides	7.6	230.0				

=== November ===
November
- Strongest magnitude: 7.2 M_{w} New Hebrides
- Deadliest: 6.3 M_{w} Peru; 150 deaths
- Total fatalities: 150

Number by magnitude
- 8.0–8.9: 0
- 7.0–7.9: 2
- 6.0–6.9: 1

Date	Country and location	M_{w}	Depth (km)	MMI	Notes	Casualties	
Date	Country and location	M_{w}	Depth (km)	MMI	Notes	Dead	Injured
4	Peru, Apurimac Region	6.3	10.0	X	150 people died and many homes were destroyed.	150	
10	New Hebrides	7.2	80.0				
15	France, southeast of the Loyalty Islands, New Caledonia	7.1	150.0				

=== December ===
December
- Strongest magnitude: 6.7 M_{w} China
- Deadliest: 6.7 M_{w} China; 942 deaths
- Total fatalities: 942

Number by magnitude
- 8.0–8.9: 0
- 7.0–7.9: 0
- 6.0–6.9: 1

Date	Country and location	M_{w}	Depth (km)	MMI	Notes	Casualties	
Date	Country and location	M_{w}	Depth (km)	MMI	Notes	Dead	Injured
21	China, Yunnan Province	6.7	15.0	IX	The 1913 Eshan earthquake killed 942 people and left 112 others injured. Extensive damage with many homes being destroyed.	942	112
