= 2017 Valparaíso earthquake =

Earthquake in Chile

2017 Chile earthquake
- USGS ShakeMap of the earthquake
- UTC time: 2017-04-24 21:38:30
- ISC event: 610548803
- USGS-ANSS: ComCat
- Local date: April 24, 2017
- Local time: 18:38 CLST (UTC-3)
- Duration: 47 seconds approximately.
- Magnitude: 6.9 M_{w}
- Depth: 28 km (USGS)
- Epicenter: 33.038°S 72.062°W
- Type: Thrust
- Areas affected: Central Chile
- Max. intensity: MMI VII (Very strong)
- Tsunami: Yes
- Foreshocks: Yes; 138 in less than 2 days.
- Aftershocks: 13 of 5.0 M_{w} to 5.9 and 1 of 6.0 M_{w}, over 1000 in total.
- Casualties: None

The Valparaíso earthquake of April 2017 was a strong earthquake that shook the cities of Valparaíso and Santiago on Monday, April 24, 2017, at 18:38 local time (21:38 UTC). Its epicenter was located off the coast of the Valparaíso Region and had a magnitude of 6.9 M_{w}. On the scale of Mercalli, the earthquake reached an intensity of VII (Very Strong).

Before this seismic event there was an unusual increase in seismic activity (seismic swarm) that began on Saturday, April 22 and before the event of magnitude 6.9 more than 180 foreshocks had been recorded, the strongest being that of magnitude 6.0 that occurred in the dawn of the April 22, 2017.

Subsequent to this event, more than 1000 aftershocks have been recorded, including several earthquakes of magnitude greater than 5.0 and two earthquakes of magnitude 5.8 and 6.0 on Moment magnitude scale that occurred on Friday, April 28, 2017, at 12:30 and 13:05 local time respectively.

== Modified Mercalli intensities for some localities ==
The earthquake was widely felt throughout the central zone of Chile and in at least two provinces of Argentina.

Intensities of the earthquake on the scale of Mercalli in Chile according to ONEMI.

Locality	Region	USGS	ONEMI	Population
Andacollo	Coquimbo		IV	11k
Canela	Coquimbo		V	9k
Combarbalá	Coquimbo		V	13k
Coquimbo City	Coquimbo Region		V	228k
Illapel	Coquimbo		V	31k
La Serena City	Coquimbo		V	221k
Los Vilos	Coquimbo		V	21k
Monte Patria	Coquimbo		V	31k
Ovalle	Coquimbo		V	111k
Paiguano	Coquimbo		III	4k
Punitaqui	Coquimbo		V	11k
Río Hurtado	Coquimbo		IV	4k
Algarrobo	Valparaíso		VII	14k
Puchuncaví	Valparaíso		VII	19k
Quillota City	Valparaíso	VI	VI	91k
Greater Valparaíso	Valparaíso	VI	VII	951k
La Ligua	Valparaíso	VI		35k
El Tabo	Valparaíso	VI		13k
Colina	Metropolitan Region		VI	146k
Melipilla	Metropolitan Region		VI	124k
Puente Alto	Metropolitan Region		VI	568k
San Bernardo	Metropolitan Region		V	301k
City of Santiago	Metropolitan Region	V	VI	6.310k (+6M)
Talagante	Metropolitan Region		VI	74k
Litueche	O'Higgins		IV	6k
Navidad	O'Higgins		VII	7k
Paredones	O'Higgins		IV	6k
Pichilemu	O'Higgins		IV	16k
Rancagua	O'Higgins	IV	VI	242k
San Fernando	O'Higgins	IV	VI	74k
Santa Cruz	O'Higgins		IV	38k
Cauquenes	Maule		V	40k
Constitución	Maule		IV	46k
Curicó	Maule		IV	149k
Linares	Maule		III	94k
Sagrada Familia	Maule		IV	19k
Cabrero	Bio-Bio		III	29k
Greater Concepción	Bio-Bio	III	IV	985k

Intensities of the earthquake on the scale of Mercalli in Argentina according to INPRES.

Locality	Province	USGS	INPRES	Population
City of San Juan	San Juan Province	IV	IV	447k
City of Mendoza	Mendoza Province	III	IV	1.055k (+1M)

== Foreshock ==
The first foreshock quake was recorded at 19:46 (local time) and 22:49 (UTC) on April 22, and had a magnitude of 4.8 M_{w}, with epicenter 32 km west of Valparaíso and 28.1 km deep.

Precursor earthquakes magnitude greater than 5.0
Date	Time local	Location	Coordinates	Depth	Magnitude	MMI	Agency.
April 22, 2017	23:36:07	30 km W of Valparaíso	33.02S, 71.95W	20 km	6.0 M_{w}	VI	EMSC.
April 22, 2017	23:43:18	30 km W of Valparaíso	33.01S, 71.95W	20 km	5.0 M_{w}	IV	EMSC.
April 23, 2017	16:40:10	45 km W of Valparaíso	33.044S, 72.148W	16 km	5.6 M_{w}	IV	NEIC.

== Aftershock ==
After the earthquake more than 1000 aftershocks were registered, the largest one had a magnitude of 6.0 M_{w}, with an epicenter 14 kilometers south of Valparaíso and 25.9 kilometers deep.

Aftershock of magnitude greater than 5.0
Date	Time local	Location	Coordinates	Depth	Magnitude	MMI	Agency.
April 24, 2017	18:45:58	121 km NW of Valparaíso	32.416S, 72.662W	25,9 km	5.5 M_{w}	?	GUC.
April 24, 2017	18:46:04	42 km W of Valparaíso	32.972S, 72.072W	16,4 km	5.2 m_{b}	VI	NEIC.
April 24, 2017	18:46:24	35 km WNW of Valparaíso	32.931S, 71.984W	16,4 km	5.4 m_{b}	VII	NEIC.
April 24, 2017	18:48:31	39 km WSW of Valparaíso	33.135S, 72.038W	17,1 km	5.0 m_{b}	VI	NEIC.
April 24, 2017	22:43:03	46 km W of Valparaíso	33.161S, 72.093W	23,9 km	5.5 M_{w}	IV	GUC.
April 27, 2017	02:09:22	39 km SW of Valparaiso	33.265S, 71.956W	22,5 km	5.1 M_{w}	VI	NEIC.
April 28, 2017	12:30:06	37 km WSW of Valparaiso	33.219S, 71.969W	22 km	5.9 M_{w}	VII	NEIC.
April 28, 2017	12:33:28	47 km SW of Valparaiso	33.30S, 72.02W	20 km	5.1 m_{b}	V	EMSC.
April 28, 2017	12:49:41	47 km WSW of Valparaiso	33.240S, 72.080W	10 km	5.1 M_{w}	V	NEIC.
April 28, 2017	12:58:33	44 km SW of Valparaiso	33.24S, 72.04W	15 km	5.4 M_{w}	IV	EMSC.
April 28, 2017	13:05:57	14 km S of Valparaíso	33.166S, 71.662W	25,9 km	6.0 M_{w}	VI	GUC.
April 28, 2017	14:41:49	40 km SW of Valparaiso	33.279S, 71.958W	18 km	5.3 M_{w}	VII	NEIC.
April 28, 2017	22:46:02	36 km WSW of Valparaiso	33.216S, 71.962W	18,8 km	5.1 M_{w}	V	NEIC.
May 13, 2017	13:54:47	30 km W of Valparaiso	32.95S, 71.93W	30 km	5.3 m_{b}	VII	EMSC.

== Tectonic summary ==
The April 24, 2017, M6.9 earthquake west of Valparaiso, Chile, occurred as the result of thrust faulting on or near the subduction zone interface between the Nazca and Pacific plates. At the latitude of this event, the Nazca plate is moving towards the east-northeast at a velocity of 74 mm/year with respect to South America, and begins its subduction beneath the continent at the Peru–Chile Trench, 80 km to the west of the April 24 earthquake. The size, location, depth and mechanism of this event are all consistent with its occurrence on the megathrust interface in this region.

While commonly plotted as points on maps, earthquakes of this size are more appropriately described as slip over a larger fault area. Events of the size of the April 24, 2017, earthquake are typically about 40x20 km in size (length x width).

Chile has a long history of massive earthquakes, including the 2010 M 8.8 Maule earthquake in central Chile, which ruptured a ~400 km long section of the plate boundary immediately south of this 2017 event. The April 24, 2017, earthquake lies close to where the Juan Fernández Ridge enters the subduction zone, in a section of the plate boundary that ruptured in a M 8.0 earthquake in March 1985, and previously in the 1906 M 8.2 Valparaiso earthquake (reported by some to be as large as M 8.6). To the north of the Juan Fernandez Ridge, the subduction zone last ruptured in the M 8.3 Illapel earthquake in September 2015. This subduction zone also hosted the largest earthquake on record, the 1960 M 9.5 earthquake in southern Chile. Over the century prior to the April 24, 2017, earthquake, the region within 400 km of this event has hosted 19 M 7+ earthquakes. Prior to the April 24 M 6.9 event, the region immediately surrounding this earthquake hosted 9 other events of M 4.5 or larger over the preceding 2 days, including a M 5.9 earthquake on April 23, 2017. The 6.9 shock was also preceded by 4 seconds by a M~4 foreshock. Within an hour of the M 6.9 earthquake, 4 aftershocks of M 4.7-5.4 had been located.

== Magnitude ==
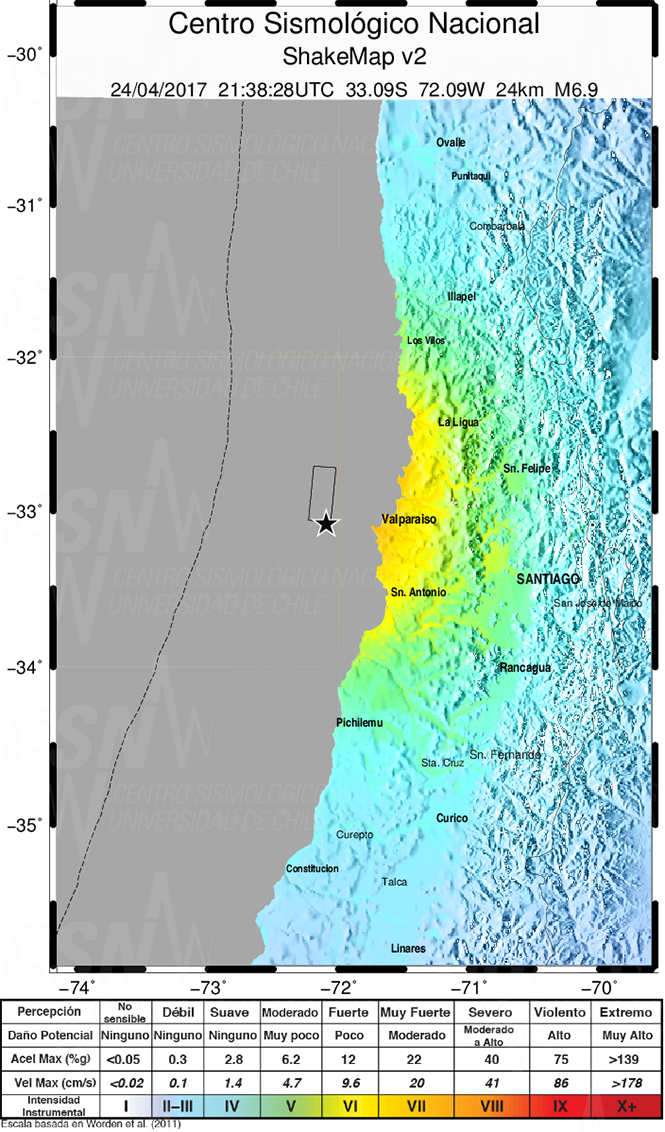
Rupture of the earthquake off the coast of Valparaíso.

This list includes information about the earthquake, which were measured by different seismological institutions worldwide.

Date	Time local	Time UTC	Region	Coordinates	Depth	Magnitude	Agency.
April 24, 2017	18:38:28	21:38:28	offshore Valparaiso, Chile	33.089S, 72.116W	24,1 km	6.9 M_{w}	GUC.
April 24, 2017	18:38:27	21:38:27	offshore Valparaiso, Chile	33.03S, 71.85W	10 km	6.9 M_{w}	EMSC.
April 24, 2017	18:38:30	21:38:30	offshore Valparaiso, Chile	33.038S, 72.062W	28 km	6.9 M_{w}	NEIC.
April 24, 2017	18:38:21	21:38:21	off the coast of Valparaiso, Chile	33.072S, 72.298W	14 km	6.6	INPRES.
April 24, 2017	18:38:29	21:38:29	near the coast of Valparaiso, Chile	33.02S, 71.86W	20 km	6.8 M_{w}	GFZ.
April 24, 2017	18:38:25	21:38:25	offshore Valparaiso, Chile	32.98S, 71.92W	10 km	6.7 M_{w}	INGV.
April 24, 2017	18:38:26	21:38:26	near the coast of Valparaiso, Chile	32.95S, 71.80W	20 km	6.9 M_{w}	USP.
April 24, 2017	18:38:26	21:38:26	offshore Valparaiso, Chile	33.073S, 72.051W	25 km	6.9 M_{w}	AUST.
April 24, 2017	18:38:25	21:38:25	off the coast of Valparaiso, Chile	33.056S, 72.042W	19 km	6.9 M_{w}	IPGP.

== Tsunami ==
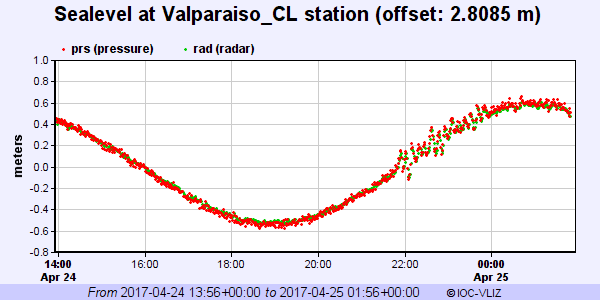
Tsunami recorded by the buoys on the coast of Valparaíso.

The National Office of Emergency of the Interior Ministry declared a tsunami warning for the coasts of the Valparaíso and O'Higgins regions. A few minutes later, the National Tsunami Service of Chile (SNAM, by its initials in Spanish), dependent on the Hydrographic and Oceanographic Service of the Chilean Navy (SHOA, by its initials in Spanish), ruled out the probability of a tsunami off the coast of Chile. However, if the tsunami was generated, according to the Pacific Tsunami Warning Center (PTWC) the maximum heights were; 16 cm in the city of Valparaíso and 10 cm in the commune of Quintero.

== See also ==
- List of earthquakes in 2017
- List of earthquakes in Chile
