= 1819 Copiapó earthquake =

Earthquake in Northern Chile

- Location within Chile
- Local date: 11 April 1819
- Local time: 15:00
- Magnitude: 8.5 M_{w}
- Epicenter: 27.0°S 71.5°W
- Areas affected: Copiapó Province, Chile
- Tsunami: Yes
- Casualties: Unknown

During April 1819, the area around Copiapó in northern Chile was struck by a sequence of earthquakes over a period of several days. The largest of these earthquakes occurred on 11 April at about 15:00 local time, with an estimated magnitude of M_{w} 8.5. The other two events, on 3 April between 08:00 and 09:00 local time and on 4 April at 16:00 local time, are interpreted as foreshocks to the mainshock on 11 April. The mainshock triggered a tsunami that affected 800 km of coastline and was also recorded at Hawaii. The city of Copiapó was devastated.

== Tectonic setting ==
Northern Chile lies above the destructive plate boundary where the Nazca plate is being subducted beneath the South American plate along the line of Peru–Chile Trench at about 8 cm per year. This part of the boundary is associated with many large megathrust earthquakes, including those in 1420 and 1922.

== Earthquake sequence ==
The magnitudes of the two foreshocks is not known, while the mainshock's magnitude has been estimated at M_{w} 8.5. The earthquake sequence is thought to have ruptured the same part of the plate boundary as the 1922 Vallenar earthquake.

== Tsunami ==
The tsunami triggered by the 11 April mainshock affected at least 800 km of the Chilean coastline, with a maximum run-up height of 4 m and a maximum inundation of 600 m. Places affected included Huasco, Caldera, and Concepción. Caldera suffered significant damage and at Concepción the schooner La Fortuna broke free from its moorings. The tsunami was also recorded in the Hawaiian Islands at Honolulu, Hilo, Kahului and Molokai. It may also have been observed at Mangareva in French Polynesia.

== Impact ==
The earthquake sequence caused major damage in both Copiapó and Vallenar. The 3 April foreshock led to widespread damage in Copiapó. The 4 April foreshock caused the collapse of several buildings in the city including a church, killing "many people". The effects of the mainshock on 11 April and its associated tsunami, combined with those of the foreshocks was the complete destruction of Copiapó and Caldera.

== See also ==
- List of historical earthquakes
- List of earthquakes in Chile
