= Valdivia earthquake =

Valdivia earthquake

- 1575 Valdivia earthquake
- 1737 Valdivia earthquake
- 1837 Valdivia earthquake
- 1960 Valdivia earthquake
