= List of earthquakes in Chile =

Chile lies in a region which is adjacent to the fast-moving Nazca plate, and has high tectonic activity. The records for earlier centuries are apparently incomplete.

Of the world's 46 known earthquakes with M ≥ 8.5 since the year 1500, one-third occurred in Chile and are shown in the map to the side. Some virtually have the same epicenters like the 1604 and 1868 (in Arica), the 1730 and 1822 (in Valparaíso), the 1751 and 1835 (in Concepción), and the 1575 and 1837 (in Valdivia).

The strongest known recorded in modern times was also in Chile, the 1960 Valdivia earthquake.

== Earthquakes ==
Date (UTC)	Time (UTC)	Reference	Epicenter	Depth (km)	Magnitude	Máx. Intensity (MMI)	Casualties	Notes
1420–08–31	c. 06:00:00	Offshore Caldera, Atacama Region	27.000°S 71.000°W	?	8.8–9.4 M_{w,} 9.4 M_{S}	?	?	Destructive tsunami in Chile, Hawaii & Japan. Further information: 1420 Caldera Earthquake
1570–02–08	c.12:00:00	Concepción, Spanish Empire (Biobío Region)	36.800°S 73.000°W	?	8.3 M_{S}	XI	c. 2000 dead	Destructive tsunami. Further information: 1570 Concepción Earthquake
1575–03–17		Santiago, Spanish Empire (Metropolitan Region)	33.400°S 70.600°W	?	7.3 M_{S}			
1575–12–16	c.17:30:00	Valdivia, Spanish Empire Los Ríos Region	39.800°S 73.200°W	?	9.0 M_{w,}8.5 M_{S}	?	?	Destructive tsunami. Further information: 1575 Valdivia Earthquake
1604–11–24	18:30:00	Offshore Arica, Spanish Empire	18.500°S 70.400°W	30.0	8.7–9.0 M_{w,} 8.5 M_{S}	XI	100+ dead	Destructive tsunami Further information: 1604 Arica Earthquake
1615–09–16	?	Offshore Arica, Spanish Empire	18.500°S 70.350°W	?	7.5 M_{S}	?	3 injured	Small - Moderate tsunami. Further information: 1615 Arica Earthquake
1647–05–13	?	Santiago, Spanish Empire	35.000°S 72.000°W	?	8.5 M_{S}	XI	1,000+ dead	Further information: 1647 Santiago Earthquake
1657–03–15	23:00:00	Concepción, Spanish Empire	36.830°S 73.030°W	?	8.3 M_{w}, 8.0 M_{S}	XI	40 dead	Further information: 1657 Concepción Earthquake Destructive tsunami
1681–03–10	?	Offshore Arica, Spanish Empire	18.500°S 70.350°W	?	7.3 M_{S}			
1687–07–12			32.750°S 70.730°W		7.3 M_{S}			
1730-07-08	08:45:00	Valparaíso, Spanish Empire	33.050°S 71.630°W	?	9.1–9.3 M_{w,} 8.7 M_{S}	XI–XII?	3,000 dead?	Further information: 1730 Valparaíso Earthquake Destructive tsunami.
1737-12-24		Valdivia	39.800°S 73.200°W		7.7 M_{S}			Tsunami
1751-05-25		Concepción	36.830°S 73.030°W		8.5 M_{S}		~65 dead	Moderate tsunami
1796-03-30			27.350°S 70.350°W		7.7 M_{S}			
1819-04-11		Copiapó	27.350°S 70.350°W		8.2–8.5 M_{w}			Destructive tsunami
1822-11-19	?	Valparaíso, Valparaíso Region	33.050°S 71.630°W	?	8.5 M_{S}	XI	70–300 dead, 200 injured	Further information: 1822 Valparaíso Earthquake Moderate tsunami
1829-09-26			33.050°S 71.630°W		7.0 M_{S}			
1831-10-08			18.500°S 71.000°W		7.8 M_{S}			
1833-09-18			18.500°S 70.400°W	60	7.7 M_{S}			
1835-02-20	14:30:00	Concepción, Biobío Region	36.830°S 73.030°W	?	~8.5 M_{w}	XI?	50+ dead	Further information: 1835 Concepción Earthquake Destructive tsunami. Devastating damage in Concepción. Known as the "Charles Darwin Earthquake", because the naturalist was visiting the area, observing the earthquake effects in Valdivia and the subsequent tsunami in Concepción-Talcahuano.
1837-11-07	10:00:00	Valdivia, Los Ríos Region	39.800°S 73.200°W	?	8.8–9.5 M_{w}	?	14 dead	Further information: 1837 Valdivia Earthquake Moderate tsunami.
1847-10-08			31.610°S 71.180°W		7.3 M_{S}			
1849-12-17			29.950°S 71.370°W		7.5 M_{S}			Moderate tsunami
1850-12-06			33.810°S 70.220°W		7.3 M_{S}			
1851-04-02			33.320°S 71.420°W		7.1 M_{S}			
1859-10-05			27.350°S 70.350°W		7.6 M_{S}			Moderate tsunami
1868-08-13	20:45:00	Offshore Arica, Department of Moquegua, Peru (now Arica y Parinacota Region, Chile)	18.500°S 70.350°W	?	8.8–9.1 M_{w}	XI	25,000+ dead	Further information: 1868 Arica Earthquake Destructive tsunami.
1869-08-24			19.600°S 70.230°W		7.5 M_{S}			Moderate tsunami
1871-10-05			20.200°S 70.170°W		7.3 M_{S}			Tsunami
1877-05-10	01:16:00	Offshore Iquique, Department of Tarapacá, Peru (now Tarapacá Region, Chile)	19.600°S 70.230°W	?	8.7–8.9 M_{w}	XI	2,385 dead	Further information: 1877 Iquique Earthquake Destructive tsunami
1878-01-23			20.000°S 70.300°W	40	7.9 M_{S}			
1879-02-02			53.000°S 70.670°W		7.3 M_{S}			
1880-08-15			31.620°S 71.180°W		7.7 M_{S}			
1906-08-17	00:40:04	Valparaíso, Valparaíso Region	32.400°S 71.400°W	25.0–35.0	8.2 M_{W}	XI	3,882 dead	Further information: 1906 Valparaíso Earthquake
1909-06-08	05:46:37	Chañaral, Atacama Region	26.154°S 70.502°W	35.0	7.5 M_{w}	?	?	?
1910-10-04			22.000°S 69.000°W		7.3 M_{S}			
1911-09-15			20.000°S 72.000°W		7.3 M_{S}			
1914-01-30	03:36:06	Offshore Constitución, Maule Region	34.763°S 73.309°W	15.0	7.7 M_{w}	V?	–	–
1917-02-14			30.000°S 73.000°W		7.0 M_{S}			
1918-05-20			28.500°S 71.500°W		7.9 M_{S}			
1918-12-04	11:47:51	Chañaral, Atacama Region	26.462°S 70.650°W	40.0	8.0 M_{w}	VII?	8 dead	1918 Copiapó Earthquake. Moderate tsunami
1919-03-01			41.000°S 73.500°W	40	7.2 M_{S}			
1919-03-02			41.000°S 73.500°W	40	7.3 M_{S}			
1920-12-10			39.000°S 73.000°W		7.4 M_{S}			
1922-11-07			28.000°S 72.000°W		7.0 M_{S}			
1922-11-10	04:32:51	Near Vallenar, Atacama Region	28.293°S 69.852°W	70.0	8.5 M_{w}	XI	1,000 dead	Further information: 1922 Vallenar Earthquake Moderate tsunami
1923-05-04			28.750°S 71.750°W	60	7.0 M_{S}			
1925-05-15			26.000°S 71.500°W	50	7.1 M_{S}			
1926-04-28			24.000°S 69.000°W	180	7.0 M_{S}			
1927-11-21	23:12:33	Puerto Cisnes, Aysén Region	44.861°S 72.686°W	15.0	7.0 M_{w}	IX–X	?	Intense earthquake caused several landslides and a moderate tsunami, impacting the surrounding epicenter area, specially the Moradela Channel.
1928-11-20			22.500°S 70.500°W	25	7.1 M_{S}			
1928-12-01	04:06:17	Offshore Curepto, Maule Region	35.084°S 72.267°W	35.0	7.7 M_{w}	IX	279 dead	Further information: 1928 Talca Earthquake Tsunami
1929-10-19			23.000°S 69.000°W	100	7.5 M_{S}			
1931-03-18			32.500°S 72.000°W		7.1 M_{S}			
1933-02-23			20.000°S 71.000°W	40	7.6 M_{S}			
1936-03-01			40.000°S 72.500°W	120	7.1 M_{S}			
1936-07-13			24.500°S 70.000°W	60	7.3 M_{S}			
1939-01-24	03:32:14	Chillán, Ñuble Province (Nowadays Ñuble Region)	36.296°S 72.213°W	60.0	7.9 M_{w,} 8.3 M_{S}	X	28,000 dead, 40,000 injured	Further information: 1939 Chillán Earthquake Deadliest earthquake in Chile's history.
1939-04-18			27.000°S 70.500°W	100	7.4 M_{S}			
1940-10-11			41.500°S 74.500°W		7.0 M_{S}			
1942-07-08			24.000°S 70.000°W	140	7.0 M_{S}			
1943-03-14			20.000°S 69.500°W	150	7.2 M_{S}			
1943-04-06	16:07:18	Ovalle, Coquimbo Region	31.262°S 71.368°W	35.0	8.1 M_{w}	VIII–IX	11 dead, 49 injured	Further information: 1943 Ovalle Earthquake Minor tsunami.
1943-12-01			21.000°S 69.000°W	100	7.0 M_{S}			
1945-07-13			33.250°S 70.500°W	100	7.1 M_{S}			
1946-08-02	19:18:52	Chañaral, Atacama Region	26.449°S 70.568°W	39.2	6.9 M_{w}	VIII–IX	8 dead, 35 injured	1946 Copiapó Earthquake.
1949-04-19			38.000°S 73.500°W	70	7.3 M_{S}			
1949-04-25			19.750°S 69.000°W	110	7.3 M_{S}			
1949-05-29			22.000°S 69.000°W	100	7.0 M_{S}			
1949-12-17	06:53:32	Tierra del Fuego, Magallanes Region	53.972°S 69.562°W	10.0	7.7 M_{w}	VIII	–	Further information: 1949 Tierra del Fuego Earthquakes
1949-12-17	15:07:57	Tierra del Fuego, Magallanes Region	53.996°S 70.057°W	10.0	7.6 M_{w}	VIII	–	Further information: 1949 Tierra del Fuego Earthquakes
1950-01-29			53.500°S 71.500°W		7.0 M_{S}			
1950-12-09	21:38:51	Calama, Antofagasta Region	23.977°S 67.912°W	113.9	8.2 M_{w}	VII	1 dead, several injured	Further information: 1950 Calama Earthquake
1953-05-06	17:16:48	Treguaco, Ñuble Region	36.500°S 72.600°W	64.0	7.6 M_{S}	X	12 dead, 40 injured	Further information: 1953 Itata Earthquake
1953-12-06			22.100°S 68.700°W	128	7.4 M_{S}			
1954-02-08			29.000°S 70.500°W		7.7 M_{S}			
1955-04-19			30.000°S 72.000°W		7.1 M_{S}			Tsunami
1956-01-08			19.000°S 70.000°W	11	7.1 M_{S}			
1956-12-17			25.500°S 68.500°W		7.0 M_{S}			
1957-07-29			23.500°S 71.500°W		7.0 M_{S}			
1958-09-04	21:51:00	Cajón del Maipo, Metropolitan Region	?	10.0?	6.9 M_{?}	IX-X	4 dead, 35 injured	1958 Las Melosas Earthquakes. A sequence of 3 earthquakes with epicenters near Las Melosas locality, which violently struck the mountain area of Cajón del Maipo, including towns like El Volcán, Queltehues, San Gabriel and San José de Maipo
1958-09-04	21:52:00	Cajón del Maipo, Metropolitan Region	?	10.0?	6.7 M_{?}	IX-X	4 dead, 35 injured	1958 Las Melosas Earthquakes. A sequence of 3 earthquakes with epicenters near Las Melosas locality, which violently struck the mountain area of Cajón del Maipo, including towns like El Volcán, Queltehues, San Gabriel and San José de Maipo
1958-09-04	21:56:00	Cajón del Maipo, Metropolitan Region	?	10.0?	6.8 M_{?}	IX-X	4 dead, 35 injured	1958 Las Melosas Earthquakes. A sequence of 3 earthquakes with epicenters near Las Melosas locality, which violently struck the mountain area of Cajón del Maipo, including towns like El Volcán, Queltehues, San Gabriel and San José de Maipo
1959-06-13			20.420°S 69.000°W	83	7.5 M_{S}			
1960-05-21	10:02:57	Cañete, Biobío Region	37.824°S 73.353°W	25.0	8.1–8.3 M_{w}	X	125 dead	1960 Concepción Earthquakes A series of strong earthquakes in Biobío and Aracucanía. They formed part of the foreshock sequence for the 1960 Valdivia earthquake.
1960-05-22	10:30:44	Nahuelbuta National Park	37.775°S 73.017°W	25.0	7.1 M_{w}	X	125 dead	1960 Concepción Earthquakes A series of strong earthquakes in Biobío and Aracucanía. They formed part of the foreshock sequence for the 1960 Valdivia earthquake.
1960-05-22	18:56:02	Traiguén, Araucanía Region	38.061°S 73.039°W	25.0	7.8 M_{w}	X	125 dead	1960 Concepción Earthquakes A series of strong earthquakes in Biobío and Aracucanía. They formed part of the foreshock sequence for the 1960 Valdivia earthquake.
1960-05-22	19:11:20	Valdivia	39.500°S 74.500°W	25.0	9.4–9.6 M_{w}	XII	1,000–6,000 dead	1960 Valdivia Earthquake Strongest earthquake in recorded history. Destructive tsunami in Chile, Hawai'i, Japan .
1960-06-19			38.000°S 73.500°W		7.3 M_{S}			
1960-11-01			38.500°S 75.100°W	55	7.4 M_{S}			
1961-07-13			41.700°S 75.200°W	40	7.0 M_{S}			
1962-02-14			37.800°S 72.500°W	45	7.3 M_{S}			
1962-08-03			23.300°S 68.100°W	107	7.1 M_{S}			
1965-02-23	22:11:47	Offshore Taltal, Antofagasta Region	25.633°S 70.679°W	35.0	7.0 M_{w}	VII	1 dead	
1965-03-28	16:33:16	La Ligua, Valparaíso Region	32.522°S 71.233°W	70.0	7.4–7.6 M_{w}	IX	400–500 dead, c. 300 injured	Further information: 1965 La Ligua Earthquake
1966-12-28	08:18:07	Taltal, Antofagasta Region	25.510°S 70.740°W	25.0	7.7 M_{w}	VIII	6 dead, 30 injured	A 5.8 meter high tsunami was registered.
1967-03-13			21.800°S 70.000°W	33	7.5 M_{S}			
1967-12-21	02:25:26	Tocopilla, Antofagasta Region	21.865°S 69.939°W	45.0	7.3 MW	VIII	10 dead, 40 injured	1967 Tocopilla Earthquake.
1971-06-17			25.402°S 69.058°W	76	7.0 M_{S}			
1971-07-09	03:03:20	La Ligua, Valparaíso Region	32.601°S 71.076°W	60.3	7.8 M_{w}	IX	83 dead, 447 injured	Further information: 1971 Aconcagua Earthquake Minor tsunami.
1974-08-18			38.453°S 73.431°W	36	7.1 M_{S}			
1975-05-10	14:27:38	Cordillera de Nahuelbuta (Contulmo, Biobío Region)	38.183°S 73.232°W	6.0	7.7 M_{w,} 7.7 M_{S}	IX?	–	1975 Angol Earthquake.
1976-11-30	00:40:57	Pica, Tarapacá Region	20.520°S 68.919°W	82.0	7.5 M_{w}, 6.5 M_{b}	VIII	1 dead, 13 injured	1976 Pica Earthquake.
1979-08-03			26.518°S 70.664°W	49	7.0 M_{S}			
1981-10-16	03:25:42	Offshore Valparaíso, Valparaíso Region	33.134°S 73.074°W	33.0	7.2 M_{w}	V–VI	–	
1983-10-04	18:52:13	Diego de Almagro, Atacama Region	26.535°S 70.563°W	14.8	7.4 M_{w,}	VII–VIII	5 dead, 24 injured	Considerable structural damage In Copiapó and Chañaral. Minor tsunami near the coast of Valparaíso Region.
1985-03-03	22:47:07	Algarrobo, Valparaíso Region	33.135°S 71.871°W	33.0	8.0 M_{w}	IX	177–200 dead, 2,483–2,575 injured	Further information: 1985 Algarrobo earthquake
1985-04-09	01:56:59	Rapel Lake, O'Higgins Region	34.131°S 71.618°W	37.8	7.2 M_{w}	VII	2 dead, several injured	Further information: 1985 Rapel Lake Earthquake
1987-03-05	09:17:05	Near the coast of Antofagasta Region	24.388°S 70.161°W	62.3	7.6 M_{w}	VII	1 dead	General damage in Antofagasta. Local tsunami generated with maximum wave heights 22 cm. at Caldera, 20 cm. at Coquimbo, 14 cm. at Valparaiso and 18 cm. at Arica
1987-08-08	15:48:56	Near the coast of Tarapacá Region	19.022°S 69.991°W	69.7	7.2 M_{w}	VII	3–5 dead, 44–112 injured	More than 1,000 houses destroyed in Arica. Several landslides occurred along the Chile-Peru border.
1995-07-30	05:11:23	Antofagasta, Antofagasta Region	23.340°S 70.294°W	45.6	8.0 M_{w}	VIII	3 dead, 58 injured	Further information: 1995 Antofagasta Earthquake
1997-10-15	01:03:33	Punitaqui, Coquimbo Region	30.933°S 71.220°W	58.0	7.1 M_{w}	VIII	8 dead, 300+ injured	Further information: 1997 Punitaqui Earthquake
1998-01-30	12:16:08	Near coast of Antofagasta Region	23.913°S 70.207°W	42.0	7.1 M_{w}	VII	1 dead	One person suffered a heart attack at Antofagasta. Minor damage to older buildings
2001-07-24	05:00:09	Chusmiza, Tarapacá Region	19.448°S 69.255°W	3.0	6.4 M_{w}	VII	1 dead	One person killed at Jaina. Two injured at Chiapa and one injured at Chusmiza.
2005-06-13	22:44:33	Inland Tarapacá Region	19.987°S 69.197°W	115.6	7.8 M_{w}	VII	11 dead, 200 injured	Further information: 2005 Tarapacá Earthquake
2007-04-21	17:53:46	Aysén Fjord, Aysén Region	45.243°S 72.648°W	36.7	6.2 M_{w}	VII	10 dead	Further information: 2007 Aysén Fjord Earthquakes
2007-11-14	15:40:50	Tocopilla, Antofagasta Region	22.247°S 69.890°W	40.0	7.7 M_{w}	VIII	2 dead, 65 injured	Further information: 2007 Tocopilla Earthquake
2010-02-27	06:34:11	Offshore Maule Region	36.122°S 72.898°W	22.9	8.8 M_{w}	IX	525 dead, 24 missing, ~12,000 injured	Further information: 2010 Maule Earthquake Destructive tsunami. Largest and most important quake in the country since the 1960 Valdivia Earthquake.
2010-03-11	14:39:43	Pichilemu, O'Higgins Region	34.290°S 71.891°W	11.0	6.9 M_{ww}	VIII	1 dead	Further information: 2010 Pichilemu Earthquakes
2010-03-11	14:55:27	Pichilemu, O'Higgins Region	34.326°S 71.799°W	18.0	7.0 M_{ww}	VIII	1 dead	Further information: 2010 Pichilemu Earthquakes
2011-01-02	20:20:17	Tirúa-Carahue, Biobío-Araucanía border region	38.355°S 73.326°W	24.0	7.2 M_{ww}	VII	—	Aftershock of the 2010 Maule Earthquake.
2012-03-25	22:37:06	Constitución, Maule Region	35.200°S 72.217°W	40.7	7.1 M_{ww}	VIII	1 dead	Further information: 2012 Constitución Earthquake
2012-04-17	03:50:15	Zapallar, Valparaíso Region	32.625°S 71.365°W	29.0	6.7 M_{ww}	VII	2 dead	One person killed at Papudo and one person died of a heart attack in Quillota.
2013-01-30	20:15:43	Vallenar, Atacama Region	28.094°S 70.653°W	45.0	6.8 M_{ww}	VII	1 dead	Further information: 2013 Vallenar Earthquake
2014-03-16	21:16:29	Offshore Iquique, Tarapacá Region	19.981°S 70.702°W	20.0	6.7 M_{ww}	VII	11 dead, 209 injured	Further information: 2014 Iquique Earthquakes
2014-04-01	23:46:47	Offshore Iquique, Tarapacá Region	19.610°S 70.769°W	25.0	8.2 M_{ww}	VIII	11 dead, 209 injured	Further information: 2014 Iquique Earthquakes
2014-04-01	23:49:25	Offshore Iquique, Tarapacá Region	20.090°S 70.390°W	25.0	7.5 M_{w}	VIII	11 dead, 209 injured	Further information: 2014 Iquique Earthquakes
2014-04-03	02:43:13	Offshore Iquique, Tarapacá Region	20.571°S 70.493°W	22.4	7.7 M_{ww}	IX	11 dead, 209 injured	Further information: 2014 Iquique Earthquakes
2014-08-23	22:32:23	Puchuncaví, Valparaíso Region	32.695°S 71.442°W	32.0	6.4 M_{ww}	VII	2 injured	
2015-09-16	22:54:32	Offshore Illapel, Coquimbo Region	31.573°S 71.674°W	22.4	8.3 M_{ww}	IX	15 dead, 34 injured, 6 missing	Further information: 2015 Illapel Earthquake
2015-09-16	23:18:41	Illapel, Coquimbo Region	31.562°S 71.426°W	28.4	7.0 M_{ww}	VII	—	Aftershock of the 2015 Illapel Earthquake occurred almost 24 minutes later.
2016-12-25	14:22:27	Offshore Quellón, Los Lagos Region	43.406°S 73.941°W	38.0	7.6 M_{ww}	VIII	—	Further information: 2016 Chiloé Earthquake
2017-04-24	21:38:30	Offshore Valparaíso, Valparaíso Region	33.038°S 72.062°W	28.0	6.9 M_{w}	VII	—	Further information: 2017 Valparaíso Earthquake
2019-01-20	01:32:52	Coquimbo, Coquimbo Region	30.040°S 71.382°W	63.0	6.7 M_{ww}	VIII	2 dead	Further information: 2019 Coquimbo Earthquake
2019-09-26	16:36:18	Southern Argentina–Chile border region	40.815°S 71.999°W	129.0	6.1 M_{ww}	IV	1 dead	A diver died due to a decompression problem in Puerto Montt, Los Lagos.
2019-09-29	15:57:53	Offshore Constitución, Maule Region	35.476°S 73.163°W	11.0	6.7 M_{ww}	VI	1 dead	A woman died in Concepción, Biobío due to a heart attack.
2020-06-03	07:35:36	San Pedro de Atacama, Antofagasta Region	23.274°S 68.468°W	112.0	6.8 M_{ww}	VI	—	
2020-09-01	04:09:28	Offshore Carrizal Bajo, Atacama Region	27.969°S 71.306°W	21.0	6.8 M_{ww}	VII	—	2020 Huasco Earthquakes. Minor damage in Huasco, Carrizal Bajo and Vallenar. Some landslides in different points of Atacama Region.
2020-09-01	04:30:02	Offshore Carrizal Bajo, Atacama Region	28.032°S 71.266°W	16.2	6.3 M_{ww}	VI	—	2020 Huasco Earthquakes. Minor damage in Huasco, Carrizal Bajo and Vallenar. Some landslides in different points of Atacama Region.
2020-09-01	21:09:17	Offshore Carrizal Bajo, Atacama Region	27.916°S 71.370°W	16.0	6.5 M_{ww}	VI	—	2020 Huasco Earthquakes. Minor damage in Huasco, Carrizal Bajo and Vallenar. Some landslides in different points of Atacama Region.
2021-01-23	23:36:51	South Shetland Islands, Antarctica	61.810°S 55.503°W	15.0	6.9 M_{ww}	V	—	Small tsunami waves were observed with a maximum height of 4 cm. A building was damaged at a Chilean scientific base in Antarctica.
2022-07-28	04:15:03	Offshore Tocopilla, Antofagasta Region	21.931°S 70.339°W	54.0	6.1 M_{ww}	VII	—	
2022-11-13	02:24:57	Offshore Lebu, Biobío Region	37.465°S 73.676°W	18.0	6.2 M_{ww}	VII	—	
2023-10-31	12:33:43	Offshore Atacama Region	28.743°S 71.557°	34.0	6.6 M_{ww}	VII	—	
2024-07-19	01:50:48	San Pedro de Atacama, Antofagasta Region	23.079°S 67.840°W	127.3	7.4 M_{ww}	VI–VII	1 dead	1 person died due to a health problem in Calama. Some rockfalls were reported on Route 24, which connects Tocopilla with Calama. Power outages were reported in San Pedro de Atacama.
2024-12-13	23:38:18	Molina, Maule Region	35.330°S 70.726°W	109.0	6.4 M_{ww}	VI–VII	—	Minor to moderate damage to structures and water pipes in Providencia and Huechuraba in the Metropolitan Region.
2025-05-02	12:58:26	Drake Passage	56.782°S 68.209°W	10.0	7.4 M_{ww}	V	—	
2025-06-06	17:15:06	45 km SW of Diego de Almagro, Atacama Region	26.639°S 70.404°W	75.0	6.4 M_{ww}	VII	2 injured	2 people injured and moderate damage to structures in Copiapó. Water mains ruptured, power outages and rockslides at different points in Atacama Region
2025-07-31	21:34:30	28 km NE of Machalí,O'Higgins Region	34.028°S 70.398°W	8.1	4.2 M_{w}	VI	6 dead, 9 injured	Further information: 2025 El Teniente mining accident
2025-08-22	02:16:18	Drake Passage	60.319°S 61.922°W	10.0	7.5 M_{ww}	V	—	At 02:48 (UTC), SHOA issued a tsunami advisory for the Chilean Antarctic Territory. However, by 04:30, the tsunami threat for all the coast of Chile was canceled.
2025-10-10	20:29:20	Drake Passage	60.196°S 61.799°W	8.8	7.6 M_{ww}	IV	—	SHOA issued a tsunami threat to the coasts of the Chilean Antarctic territory, and at the same time, SENAPRED declared a tsunami red alert for Cabo de Hornos in Magallanes Region. Both of them were canceled some time later.
May 25, 2026	21:52:20	34 km ENE of Calama, Antofagasta	22.367°S 68.601°W	109.0	6.9 M_{ww}	VII		

== See also ==
- Geology of Chile
