= 1995 Antofagasta earthquake =

July 1995 earthquake in Chile

- Location within Chile
- UTC time: 1995-07-30 05:11:23
- ISC event: 96080
- USGS-ANSS: ComCat
- Local date: July 30, 1995
- Local time: 01:11
- Magnitude: 8.0 M_{w}
- Depth: 46 km (29 mi)
- Epicenter: 23.35°S 70.32°W
- Areas affected: Chile
- Total damage: $1.791 million
- Max. intensity: MMI VII (Very strong)
- Peak acceleration: 0.29 g
- Tsunami: 2–3 m (6 ft 7 in – 9 ft 10 in)
- Casualties: 3 dead 58–59 injured 575–630 homeless

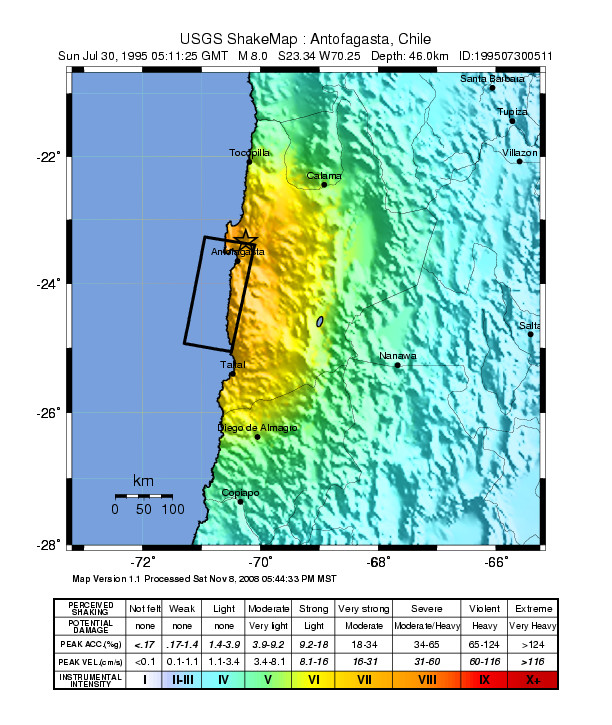
Seismic map of the earthquake. The epicenter is marked with a star.

The 1995 Antofagasta earthquake occurred on July 30 at 05:11 UTC (01:11 local time) with a moment magnitude of 8.0 and a maximum Mercalli intensity of VII (Very strong). The Antofagasta Region in Chile was affected by a moderate tsunami, with three people killed, 58 or 59 injured, and around 600 homeless. Total damage from the earthquake and tsunami amounted to $1.791 million.

== Tectonic setting ==
Chile lies along the oblique convergent boundary between the oceanic Nazca plate and the continental South American plate. Crustal deformation is primarily accommodated by two main types of faulting: strike slip and reverse faulting subduction zone earthquakes. Reverse faulting deformation is taken up by the Peru-Chile Trench, on which this earthquake occurred. Slip rate on the fault is 68–80 mm (2.7–3.1 in)/yr, and as a result the subduction zone is responsible for many megathrust earthquakes in the region. Some of the largest recorded earthquakes ever recorded occurred in the area, such as the 1960 Valdivia earthquake, the 1730 Valparaíso earthquake, and the 1420 Caldera earthquake. Strike slip faulting is taken up the by the Liquiñe-Ofqui Fault. It is responsible for a M_{w} 7.7 earthquake as part of the aftershock sequence of the 1960 Valdivia earthquake, and potentially was involved with the main rupture as well.

== Earthquake ==
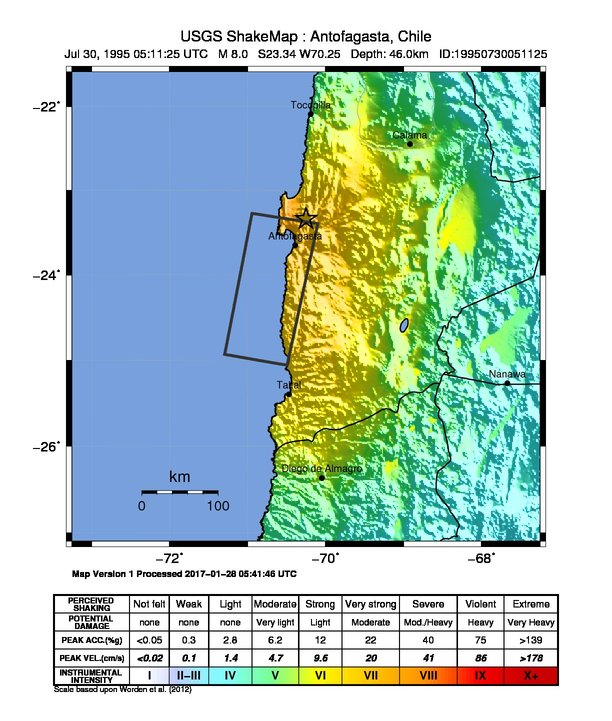
ShakeMap provided by the United States Geological Survey

At 1:11 local time on July 30, 1995, a large earthquake struck northern Chile. The M_{w} 8.0 earthquake struck at a depth of 46 km (29 mi) with an epicenter near Antofagasta. The focal mechanism of this earthquake indicates thrust faulting along the subduction zone, which is consistent with other large earthquakes along the plate boundary in this region. The maximum slip was 5.4 m (18 ft) along a 180 km × 70 km (112 mi × 43 mi) zone of rupture. Foreshock activity was minimal, but large aftershocks lasted a while after the mainshock, with the largest being a shallower M_{w} 6.4 event with a Modified Mercalli Intensity of VII three days later. The event occurred at the edge of a known seismic gap that produced the 1877 Iquique earthquake, and research suggests that this earthquake may have put more stress on the region as well. The event is not thought to have ruptured the shallow plate interface in the region, leaving it susceptible to future large megathrust earthquakes such as the 1877 event.

== Tsunami ==
The tsunami observed was smaller than expected, however this may be explained by the depth of the event. Maximum run-up height was measured at 2.8 m (9 ft 2 in) at Antofagasta. Tide gauges at Antofagasta, Caldera, and Iqiuque recorded wave heights of 1.5 m (4 ft 11 in), 0.6 m (2 ft 0 in), 0.3 m (1 ft 0 in) respectively. 10 hours after initial rupture, tsunami waves reached French Polynesia where anomalously large run-ups of 2.5 m (8 ft 2 in) and crest-to-trough wave heights of 3 m (9.8 ft) were recorded. Tahiti itself recorded a small tsunami of 20 cm (7.9 in), while Hilo, Hawaii registered heights of 80 cm (31 in).

== See also ==
- List of earthquakes in 1995
- List of earthquakes in Chile
- List of earthquakes in Peru
