= 1657 Concepción earthquake =

1657 earthquake in Chile

- Location within Chile
- Local date: 15 March 1657
- Local time: 20:00 (Note: Time of the earthquake has been questioned by authors. The only time it was made reference was by Fernand Montessus de Ballore.)
- Magnitude: ≤8.0 M_{s} 8.3 M_{w}
- Epicenter: 36.83°S 73.03°W
- Areas affected: Chile
- Max. intensity: MMI XI (Extreme)
- Tsunami: yes
- Casualties: 40 dead

The 1657 Concepción earthquake occurred on March 15 at 20:00 local time off the coast of Concepción, Biobío Region in the Spanish Empire (present-day central Chile). The earthquake caused severe damage along the coast, and generated a large tsunami in the Bay of Concepción. At least 40 people were killed, the majority due to drowning from the tsunami. The town of Concepción was the hardest hit, with the earthquake and tsunami totally destroying it.

== Tectonic setting ==
Earthquakes are frequent in Chile; lying in the so-called Ring of Fire, where many of the world's active volcanoes and seismic activities are concentrated at. Off the coast of Chile, the Nazca Plate subducts beneath the South American Plate along the Peru–Chile Megathrust; a convergent plate boundary. Active subduction produces large earthquakes including the 1960 Valdivia earthquake which had a magnitude of 9.5–9.6 on the moment magnitude scale. These earthquakes are associated with thrust faulting on the interface of the plate boundary megathrust. Thrusting during large earthquakes causes significant uplift of the seafloor, causing tsunamis. On some occasions, earthquakes occur within the downgoing tectonic plate instead.

== Impact ==
In Concepción, a loud rumbling sound was heard by its inhabitants. The intense ground motions made it difficult for many people to stand on their feet. The shaking continued for as long as four minutes. Although strong, the shaking was described as weaker compared to previous earthquakes in the region. Nevertheless, most structures in the city were obliterated. Most of the city was destroyed in the first moments of the earthquake. Churches, military facilities, and homes crumbled. The only intact structures were a cathedral and several homes near a hill. Residents reported a fireball in the sky during the earthquake. Diego de Rosales, a Spanish author, said the Penco river began to flood its banks.

The earthquake resulted in severe damage extending all the way to Chillán, located further inland to the east. There, the earthquake destroyed a church. Some damage was also reported in Santiago, Quillota and Arauco. A cathedral in Santiago which was rebuilt hastily after the 1647 earthquake collapsed. It was rebuilt a second time but was destroyed in 1730 during another earthquake.

=== Tsunami ===
At the time of the earthquake, the coast experienced a high tide which may have worsened the effects of the tsunami. The first of three large tsunami waves struck approximately one hour after the quake. Two additional waves struck later, causing further damage and destroying the remaining intact buildings in Concepción. The largest wave had a maximum run-up of 8 meters. The first wave carried a merchant ship inland and beached it onto the roof of a convent. A second wave, described as the largest, swept the ship and dumped it into a lagoon. The tsunami flooded the city at a minimum height of 4 meters and higher. A recent defense installation was inundated. In the city plaza, the waves did not cause severe damage but managed to flood a chapel and several stores at its northern edge.

== Earthquake characteristics ==
The earthquake occurred as a result of shallow thrust faulting on the subduction zone megathrust along the west coast of Chile. Excitation of a tsunami suggests an epicenter located offshore. Documentation of serious destruction in Concepción also suggest the earthquake rupture occurred near the town. The extensive area of damage and felt reports were similar to that of the 1835 Concepción earthquake. The rupture area was similar in size and location as the M_{w} 8.8 Maule earthquake in 2010, but located south of the 1647 Santiago earthquake. A surface-wave magnitude of 8.0 or less was estimated.

== See also ==
- List of earthquakes in Chile
- List of historical earthquakes
- List of historical tsunamis

== Notes ==
Citations
