= 1737 Valdivia earthquake =

South-Central Chilean earthquake

- Location within Chile
- Local date: December 24, 1737
- Magnitude: 7.5 M_{w}
- Epicenter: 39.813889°S 73.245833°W
- Areas affected: Chile
- Tsunami: no

The 1737 Valdivia earthquake struck south-central Chile on December 24 with an estimated moment magnitude of 7.5. Together with earthquakes in 1575 and 1837 the earthquake is among the historical predecessors to the great 1960 earthquake. While the overlap in affected areas is significant relative to the 1837 earthquake, the 1737 earthquake may have occurred slightly more to the north.

The earthquake was felt in Concepción but most damage occurred in the towns of Valdivia and Castro, Chiloé Archipelago. In both of these locations churches were destroyed by the earthquake. In addition the Valdivian Fort System and the Royal Storehouse of Valdivia took heavy damage. Landslides occurred next to Villarrica, Calafquén, and Riñihue lakes. Over all this indicates the rupture zone was about 640 km long, with most damage being concentrated in the middle section (Valdivia).

There is no evidence the earthquake would have produced a tsunami.

== See also ==
- 1730 Valparaíso earthquake
- 1741 wreckage of HMS Wager
- 1751 Concepción earthquake
- Huilliche uprising of 1712
- Mapuche uprising of 1723
- Mapuche uprising of 1766
