= 2013 Vallenar earthquake =

Coordinates: 28.080°S 70.621°W

- Location within Chile Location within South America
- UTC time: 2013-01-30 20:15:43
- ISC event: 602363406
- USGS-ANSS: ComCat
- Local date: January 30, 2013
- Local time: 17:15:43 (UTC-3)
- Magnitude: 6.8 M_{ww}
- Depth: 45 km (28 mi)
- Type: Reverse
- Areas affected: Chile
- Max. intensity: MMI VI (Strong)
- Casualties: 1 dead

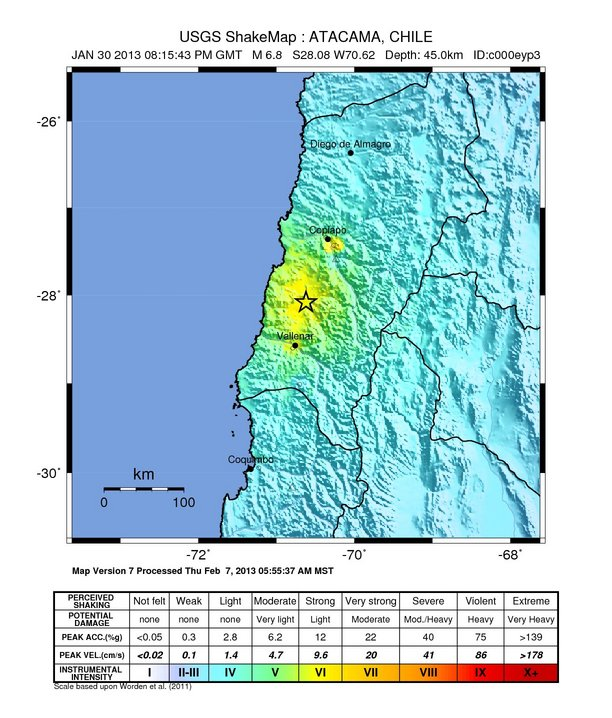
2013 Vallenar earthquake intensity map

The 2013 Vallenar earthquake (Spanish: Terremoto de Vallenar de 2013) was an earthquake that occurred near Vallenar, Chile on January 30, 2013, 20:15 (UTC). Depth was 45.0 km (28.0 mi), moment magnitude was 6.8. One person died of a heart attack.

== See also ==
- List of earthquakes in 2013
- List of earthquakes in Chile
- 1922 Vallenar earthquake
