= 1570 Concepción earthquake =

Earthquake in Chile

- Location within Chile
- UTC time: 1570-02-08 13:00
- Local date: February 8, 1570
- Local time: 9:00 am
- Magnitude: 8.3 M_{s}
- Epicenter: 36°45′S 73°00′W
- Max. intensity: MMI XI (Extreme)
- Tsunami: Yes
- Aftershocks: Persisted for five months after the mainshock.
- Casualties: Est. over 2000

The 1570 Concepción earthquake occurred at 9:00, on February 8, 1570. The earthquake caused significant damage to the city of Concepción, Chile. A tsunami followed the earthquake afterwards, however the majority of the townsfolk of Concepción were able to escape inland from the tsunami. An estimated 2,000 people died in the event. Aftershocks were felt from the earthquake until 5 months afterwards.

The earthquake's magnitude was 8.3 M_{s}, located at 36°48′S 73°00′W.

== See also ==
- List of earthquakes in Chile
