= 1751 Concepción earthquake =

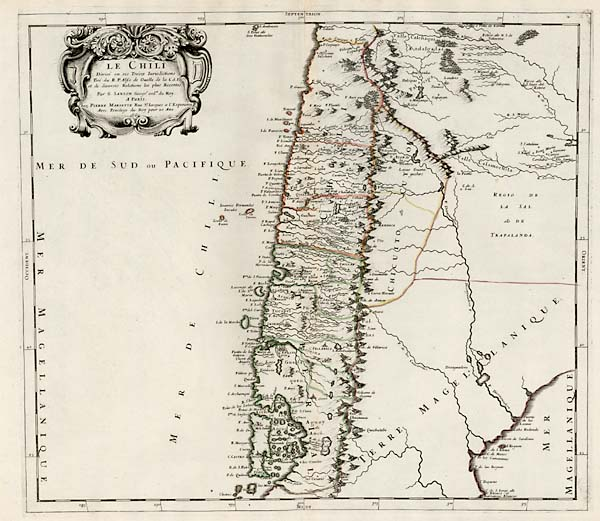
- Local date: 25 May 1751
- Local time: 01:00
- Magnitude: 8.5
- Epicenter: 36.8°S 73°W
- Areas affected: Kingdom of Chile
- Casualties: ~65 killed

The 1751 Concepción earthquake was one of the strongest and most destructive recorded quakes in Chilean history. It struck the Central Valley of the country, destroying the cities of Concepción, Chillán, Cauquenes, Curicó and Talca, probably on May 24, 1751, although there is currently a debate among scholars as to the exact date of the earthquake (see also "Other dates").

== Background ==
The city of Concepción had already been hit by several earthquakes. On this occasion the city was still in the process of recovering from the earthquake and tsunami that completely destroyed the city in 1730. Hours before the earthquake, on the night of May 23, there were several tremors. This had caused some Concepción residents, accustomed to earthquakes, to prepare for the worst.

== Development ==
The disaster was composed of two parts: the earthquake itself, and a series of tsunamis some 10 to 40 minutes later.

=== Earthquake ===
The earthquake began around one o'clock in the morning. According to one chronicle of a resident of Valparaíso and another of a resident of Concepción, the quake lasted about six minutes, although in Valparaíso there was no major damage recorded. During the earthquake and the subsequent tsunami, all of the buildings in the city of Concepción were destroyed. The records indicate that the earthquake was so intense that "the residents could not remain standing."

The earthquake was felt in the rest of the Chilean Central Valley, but with less intensity. One of the most affected cities near Concepción was Chillán, where the entire city was destroyed and the river changed its course, ending up nearly 15 blocks from its original location. In Santiago, the tower of the cathedral was destroyed by the tremor, although no other major damage was reported in the rest of the city.

== Tsunami ==
Between 1:05 and 1:45, the sea receded more than 1 km, and then three to five tsunami waves struck land. The height and force of each wave increased, and the last was the most disastrous. Swells were observed as far away as the port of El Callao in Peru. The tsunami also destroyed the new settlement at the Juan Fernández Islands, where 35 people died, including the first governor, Navarro Santaella, and his wife.

== Consequences ==
The major consequence of the earthquake was the relocation of the city (14 years after the quake) from its original location, in part as a response by the residents to the successive destructions by the tsunamis of 1730 and 1751. The chosen location (after a long controversy between the civil authorities and the church, headed by Bishop José de Toro y Zambrano Romo) was the Valle de la Mocha, where Concepción presently lies. Despite this, the demonym "penquista" (referring to the original location of the city, at Penco) was kept, and is still used today.

== Aftershocks ==
The earthquake had enough aftershocks that they prevented any immediate attempts at rebuilding, including the emergency shelters. One of the strongest occurred on June 26, 1751. Approximately half a month later, the aftershocks ceased.

== Other dates ==
Although the majority of sources and accounts make reference to the early morning of May 25, 1751, as the date of the earthquake, other records indicate that it was on the night of May 24. And although the majority of historians say that the foreshocks of the earthquake occurred on the night of May 23, there exist records that indicate that they happened during the 23rd and 24th, with the earthquake happening on the 25th.

== See also ==
- List of earthquakes in Chile
- List of historical earthquakes
