= Centro Sismológico Nacional =

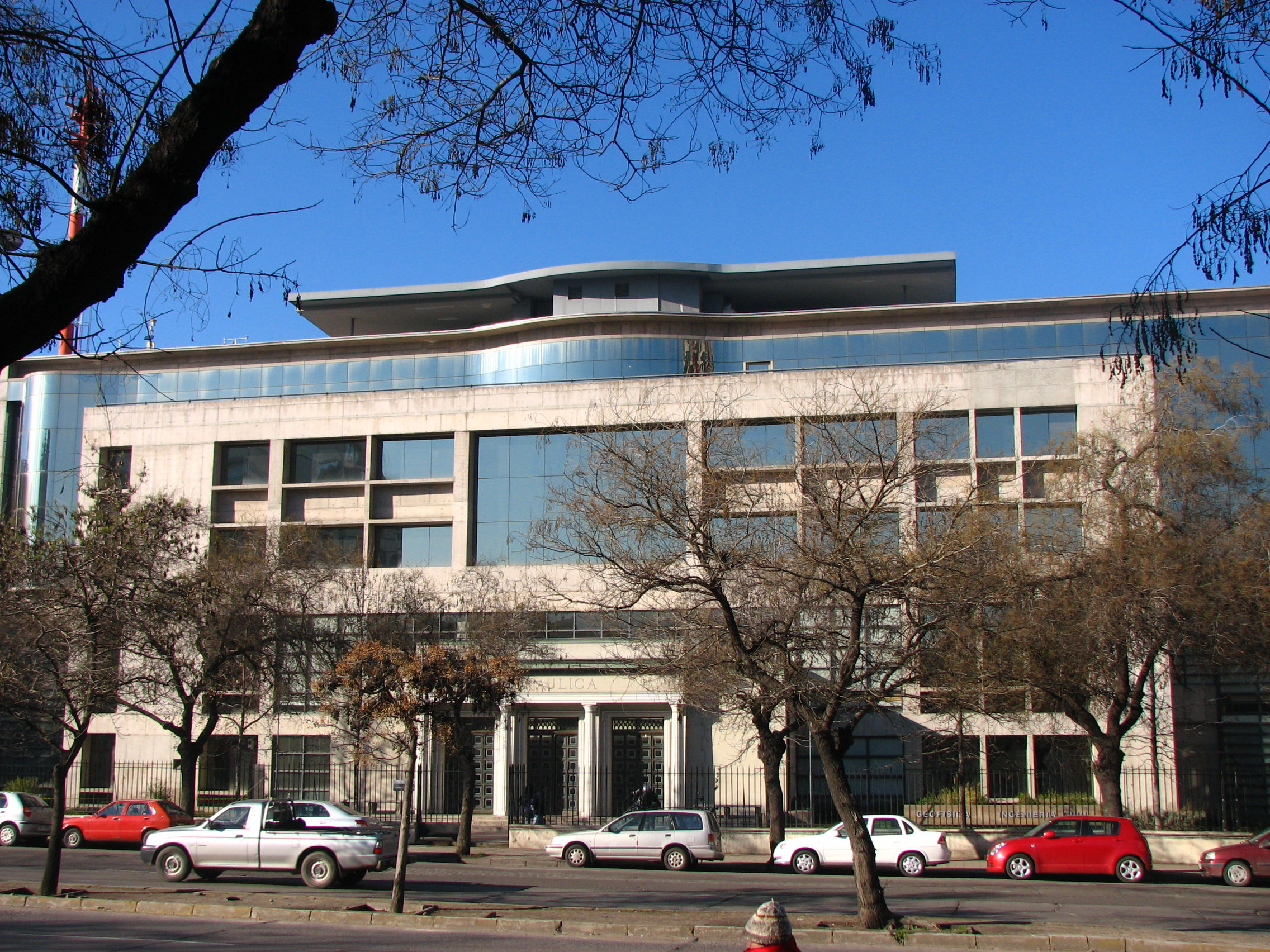
Department of Geophysics, Faculty of Physical and Mathematical Sciences, University of Chile, home to the CSN.

The National Seismological Center of the University of Chile (Spanish: Centro Sismológico Nacional de la Universidad de Chile (CSN)) is part of the Department of Physical and Mathematical Sciences at the University of Chile. The center collects information about seismic activity in Chile and delivers it to the National Office of Emergency at the Ministry of the Interior (ONEMI) and the Hydrographic and Oceanographic Service of the Chilean Navy (SHOA). The current director of the CSN is Sergio Barrientos Parra. The National Seismological Center is housed by the Department of Geophysics (DGF).

== History ==
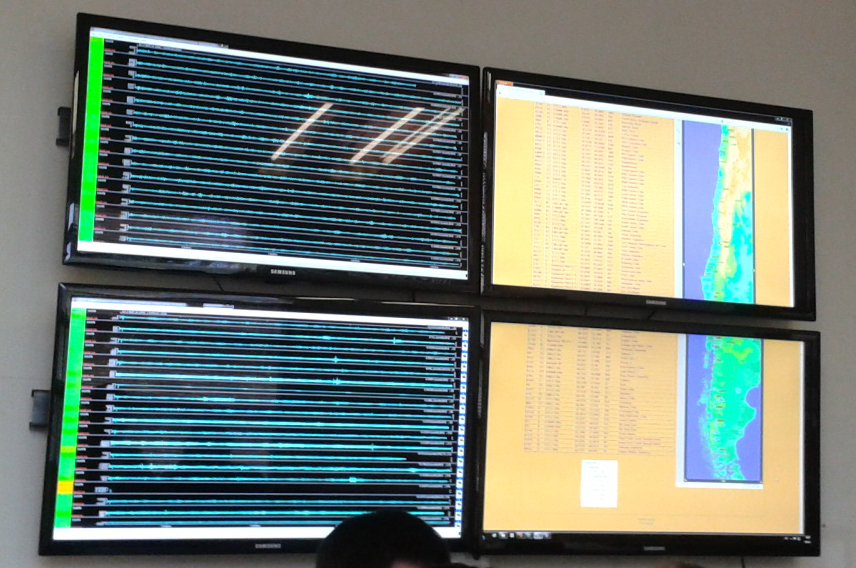
Real-time monitoring of seismic events in 2012.

El Centro Sismológico Nacional (originally the Chilean Seismological Service) was created in response to the 1906 Valparaíso Earthquake. The devastating impact of the earthquake highlighted the urgent need for a national seismological service. The administration of Pedro Montt, then president of Chile, founded it under the name Chilean Seismological Service on May 1, 1908. The service was the idea of Valentín Letelier, a former director of the University of Chile. The first director of the CSN, Fernand de Montessus de Ballore, was a former commander of the French army and an amateur geologist and seismologist.

In 1869, the first seismological station run by the CSS was built on the Santa Lucía Hill in Santiago. This location was selected due to the solid Trachytic bedrock, which lent greater stability to the foundations than surrounding clay deposits. It was designed as the central hub of a national network, with additional stations installed in the surrounding areas of Tacna, Copiapó, Osorno, and Punta Arenas. A total of 29 stations were added in 1909. The system also collected testimonies from observers, including telegraphers, lighthouse guardians, railway workers, and volunteers.

In 1927, the service was placed under the Department of Geophysics (DOG) by the University of Chile. In 2013, its name was officially changed to Centro Sismológico Nacional (CSN).

After an earthquake on April 21, 2007 in the Aysén Region, the national authorities were in dire need of an emergency plan in case of earthquakes and tsunamis. Thus, the Government agreed to an improvement plan with the Faculty of Physical and Mathematical Sciences of the University of Chile, which houses the DOG, and by extension, the Chilean Seismological Service. The plan addressed both technical and scientific needs, emphasizing capabilities in the design, implementation and operation of a seismological network for the permanent monitoring of seismic activity. On February 27, 2010, a magnitude 8.8 earthquake shook the southern and central part of the country. This earthquake helped to accelerate the project, up to that point had not shown great progress. On December 28, 2012, a Collaboration Agreement was signed between the Faculty of Physical and Mathematical Sciences (FCFM) of the University of Chile and the National Emergency Office (Onemi) of the Ministry of Interior and Public Security, which came into effect on March 20, 2013. This agreement allowed the initiation of CSN activities.

Beginning in 2013, the Centro Sismológico Nacional (CSN) of the University of Chile was mandated by the Chilean government to implement a network of 65 permanent, real-time, broadband and strong-motion stations and 130 Global Navigation Satellite Systems (GNSS) monuments and receivers. These integrated sensor systems were designed to provide accurate, automatic earthquake locations and magnitudes necessary for tsunami warning and impact assessment. In near-real-time applications, the GPS stations are critical for determination of fault finiteness of M ~ 7 or larger earthquakes. Operations of these systems also provide new insights into long-term deformation and associated spatiotemporal variations in seismicity, which are necessary in long-term earthquake hazard assessment and mitigation. In addition to the real-time system described above, 297 strong-motion offline instruments complement the network for engineering purposes. Broadband data in real time are publicly available through the Incorporated Research Institutions for Seismology Data Management Center (IRIS-DMC) under networks C and C1. Strong-motion data for recorded accelerations larger than are available through the CSN webpage.

Currently, the CSN is working to improve the quantity, quality, and accessibility of national seismic information through the establishment of a seismic observation network that allows the best characterization of events of significant magnitude (earthquakes affecting the population). This includes a network of sensors distributed throughout the country and a data processing center, as well as communication procedures and protocols 24 hours a day, seven days a week, with entities that need to have the information promptly.

== Mission ==
The CSN is the official technical body in charge of monitoring seismic activity throughout the country. The mission of the CSN is to deliver quality seismological data and information promptly to the National Emergency Office of the Ministry of Interior and Public Security (ONEMI), the Hydrographic and Oceanographic Service of the Navy (HAOSN), and other government authorities. The CSN also makes its data freely available to the scientific community. The organization maintains and operates 12 seismometer monitoring stations along the San Ramón Fault, an active thrust fault which is the main seismic hazard in the Santiago metropolitan area. Station 13 became operational in August 2017.
