= Francisca Cooper Integral Evacuation and School Safety Plan =

Emergency management system in Chile

The Francisca Cooper Integral Evacuation and School Safety Plan (Spanish: Plan Integral de Evacuación y Seguridad Escolar Francisca Cooper), mostly known as Operación Deyse (English: Deyse Operation, Deyse being the acronym for de evacuación y seguridad escolar, in English of evacuation and school safety), is an emergency management system implemented in Chile for educational establishments. It was created in 1966 by the National Emergencies Office of the Interior Ministry of Chile, ONEMI.

In 2005, the ONEMI and the Ministry of Education decided to change the name of the security plan to "Francisca Cooper Plan", after a Chilean woman that died after the 2004 Indian Ocean tsunami, however, the plan is still called "Deyse".
