= 1922 Shimabara earthquake =

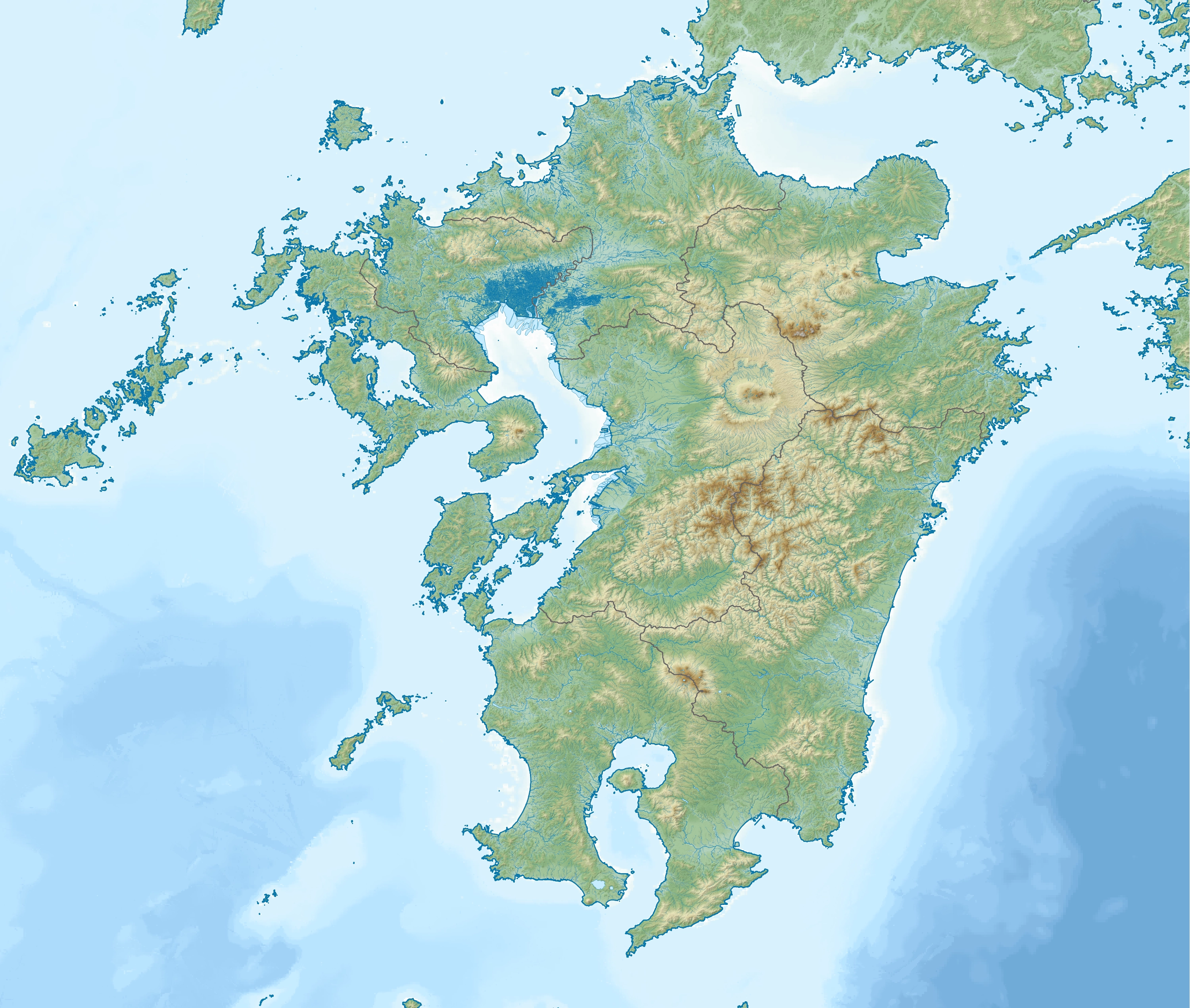
- Location within Kyushu Location within Nagasaki Prefecture
- UTC time: 1922-12-07 16:50:17
- ISC event
- 912099
- 912102
- USGS-ANSS
- ComCat
- ComCat
- Local date: December 8, 1922
- Magnitude: M6.9
- Epicenter: 32.7°N 130.1°E
- Type: Doublet earthquake
- Casualties: 27 dead

The 1922 Shimabara earthquake (Japanese: 島原地震) occurred in Kyushu, Japan on December 8, 1922. The mainshock (M6.9) was followed by a large aftershock (M6.5) 9 hours later.

== Overview ==
At 1:50 a.m. on December 8, 1922 (local time), an M6.9 earthquake occurred in Tachibana Bay, Nagasaki Prefecture, Japan. About 9 hours later, at 11:02 a.m., the largest aftershock of M6.5 occurred in almost the same location as the first earthquake.

Type of event	Date and time (JST)	Epicenter	Depth	Magnitude
Main shock	1922/12/08 01:50	32°41.6′N 130°02.2′E	19 km	M6.9
Largest aftershock	1922/12/08 11:02	32°45.1′N 130°07.5′E	0 km	M6.5

== Impact and damage ==
The damage was severe in southern Nagasaki Prefecture (Shimabara Peninsula) and western Kumamoto Prefecture. In Nagasaki Prefecture, 26 people died of which 3 were due to the largest aftershock. The earthquake caused cracks in the ground and landslides. More than 2,000 houses were damaged.

== See also ==
- List of earthquakes in 1922
