= List of earthquakes in 1922 =

Earthquakes in 1922
Approximate epicenters of the earthquakes in 1922
- 4.0–5.9 magnitude
- 6.0–6.9 magnitude
- 7.0–7.9 magnitude
- 8.0+ magnitude
- Strongest: Chile, Atacama Region November 11 (Magnitude 8.5)
- Deadliest: Chile, Atacama Region, November 11 (Magnitude 8.5) 700 deaths
- Total fatalities: 710

Number by magnitude
- 9.0+: 0
- 8.0–8.9: 1
- 7.0–7.9: 11
- 6.0–6.9: 45
- 5.0–5.9: 0

This is a list of earthquakes in 1922. Only magnitude 6.0 or greater earthquakes appear on the list. Lower magnitude events are included if they have caused death, injury or damage. Events which occurred in remote areas will be excluded from the list as they wouldn't have generated significant media interest. All dates are listed according to UTC time. The dominant event of the year both in terms of magnitude and death toll was in Chile. In November a magnitude 8.5 earthquake struck the Atacama Region. This was one of the largest events of the 20th century. In spite of the magnitude only 700 deaths were caused. Peru, Russia and Taiwan had several magnitude 7.0+ events.

== Overall ==
=== By death toll ===
Rank	Death toll	Magnitude	Location	MMI	Depth (km)	Date
1	700	8.5	Chile, Atacama Region	XI (Extreme)	70.0	November 11

- Note: At least 10 casualties

=== By magnitude ===
Rank	Magnitude	Death toll	Location	MMI	Depth (km)	Date
1	8.5	700	Chile, Atacama Region	XI (Extreme)	70.0	November 11
2	7.9	0	Peru, Loreto Region	( )	475.0	January 17
3	7.6	0	Peru, Arequipa Region	VII (Very strong)	160.0	October 11
= 4	7.3	0	United States, off the coast of northern California	( )	15.0	January 31
= 4	7.3	0	Russian SFSR, Kuril Islands	( )	35.0	October 24
= 4	7.3	0	Afghanistan, Badakhshan Province	( )	239.9	December 6
= 5	7.1	0	Russian SFSR, Kamchatka Krai	( )	241.4	March 4
= 5	7.1	0	Bolivia, Potosi Department	( )	136.4	March 28
= 5	7.1	5	Taiwan, east of	( )	20.0	September 1
= 6	7.0	0	Dutch East Indies, west of Sumba	( )	35.0	May 9
= 6	7.0	0	Taiwan, Hsinchu County	( )	15.0	October 14
= 6	7.0	0	Chile, off the coast of Atacama Region	( )	25.0	November 7

- Note: At least 7.0 magnitude

== Notable events ==
=== January ===
January
- Strongest: 7.9 M_{w} Peru
- Total fatalities: 0

Number by magnitude
- 8.0–8.9: 0
- 7.0–7.9: 2
- 6.0–6.9: 4

Date	Country and location	M_{w}	Depth (km)	MMI	Notes	Casualties	
Date	Country and location	M_{w}	Depth (km)	MMI	Notes	Dead	Injured
1	Fiji	6.7	15.0				
6	Peru, off the southern coast of	6.8	15.0	V			
17	Peru, Loreto Region	7.9	475.0	IV			
19	New Guinea, Western Province (Papua New Guinea)	6.9	15.0	VIII	Some homes were destroyed.		
22	Japan, off the east coast of Honshu	6.5	35.0				
31	Malaya, Peninsula	5.4			Rare and widely felt earthquake from Singapore in the south to Taiping in the north. Minor damage at Muar. Magnitude estimated from felt intensities.		
31	United States, off the coast of northern California	7.4	15.0	V	Some damage was reported.		

=== February ===
February
- Strongest: 6.4 M_{w} Nicaragua
- Deadliest: 6.3 M_{w} Philippines; 5 deaths
- Total fatalities: 5

Number by magnitude
- 8.0–8.9: 0
- 7.0–7.9: 0
- 6.0–6.9: 2

Date	Country and location	M_{w}	Depth (km)	MMI	Notes	Casualties	
Date	Country and location	M_{w}	Depth (km)	MMI	Notes	Dead	Injured
16	Nicaragua, off the west coast of	6.4	25.0	V	Major damage was reported.		
27	Philippines, east of Cebu	6.3	0.0		5 people were killed and some damage was caused.	5	

=== March ===
March
- Strongest: 7.1 M_{w} 2 events
- Total fatalities: 0

Number by magnitude
- 8.0–8.9: 0
- 7.0–7.9: 2
- 6.0–6.9: 3

Date	Country and location	M_{w}	Depth (km)	MMI	Notes	Casualties	
Date	Country and location	M_{w}	Depth (km)	MMI	Notes	Dead	Injured
1	Philippines, south of Negros (island)	6.0	0.0	VIII	Some homes were damaged.		
4	Russian SFSR, Kamchatka Krai	7.1	241.4				
10	United States, southern California	6.5	10.0	IX			
10	Fiji, south of	6.6	570.0				
28	Bolivia, Potosi Department	7.1	136.4				

=== April ===
April
- Strongest: 6.9 M_{w} Dutch East Indies
- Total fatalities: 0

Number by magnitude
- 8.0–8.9: 0
- 7.0–7.9: 0
- 6.0–6.9: 5

Date	Country and location	M_{w}	Depth (km)	MMI	Notes	Casualties	
Date	Country and location	M_{w}	Depth (km)	MMI	Notes	Dead	Injured
2	United States, south of Unimak Island	6.5	35.0	I			
5	Dutch East Indies, off the north coast of Papua (province)	6.9	25.0	VI			
8	Norway, west of Jan Mayen Island	6.4	15.0				
25	Russian SFSR, east of the Kuril Islands	6.6	15.0				
26	Japan, Uraga Channel, Honshu	6.8	35.0				

=== May ===
May
- Strongest: 7.0 M_{w} Dutch East Indies
- Total fatalities: 0

Number by magnitude
- 8.0–8.9: 0
- 7.0–7.9: 1
- 6.0–6.9: 5

Date	Country and location	M_{w}	Depth (km)	MMI	Notes	Casualties	
Date	Country and location	M_{w}	Depth (km)	MMI	Notes	Dead	Injured
2	British Burma, Shan State	6.7	35.0	VII			
4	Russian SFSR, Kuril Islands	6.6	15.0				
9	Dutch East Indies, Sumba	7.0	35.0	VI			
11	east of the Windward Islands	6.0	35.0				
12	France, southeast of the Loyalty Islands	6.7	25.0				
15	Japan, southeast of Hokkaido	6.5	30.0	IV			

=== June ===
June
- Strongest: 7.0 M_{w} Mexico
- Total fatalities: 0

Number by magnitude
- 8.0–8.9: 0
- 7.0–7.9: 1
- 6.0–6.9: 2

Date	Country and location	M_{w}	Depth (km)	MMI	Notes	Casualties	
Date	Country and location	M_{w}	Depth (km)	MMI	Notes	Dead	Injured
2	Philippines, east of Mindanao	6.5	15.0	V			
12	Mexico, southern Gulf of California	7.0	10.0	V			

=== July ===
July
- Strongest: 6.8 M_{w} United States
- Total fatalities: 0

Number by magnitude
- 8.0–8.9: 0
- 7.0–7.9: 0
- 6.0–6.9: 4

Date	Country and location	M_{w}	Depth (km)	MMI	Notes	Casualties	
Date	Country and location	M_{w}	Depth (km)	MMI	Notes	Dead	Injured
2	United States, Alaska Peninsula	6.8	35.0	I			
5	Japan, off the east coast of Honshu	6.5	35.0				
10	Bolivia, Chuquisaca Department	6.6	667.1				
11	Japan, Volcano Islands	6.6	35.0				

=== August ===
August
- Strongest: 6.8 M_{w} Philippines
- Total fatalities: 0

Number by magnitude
- 8.0–8.9: 0
- 7.0–7.9: 0
- 6.0–6.9: 6

Date	Country and location	M_{w}	Depth (km)	MMI	Notes	Casualties	
Date	Country and location	M_{w}	Depth (km)	MMI	Notes	Dead	Injured
11	Greece, east of Crete	6.4	20.0	V			
13	Greece, Dodecanese Islands	6.7	15.0	VI			
14	Russian SFSR, Amur Oblast	6.6	15.0				
16	Russian SFSR, off the east coast of Kamchatka	6.7	45.0	VI			
25	Mongolia, Uvs Province	6.7	10.0	VII			
29	Philippines, Mindoro	6.8	15.0	VII			

=== September ===
September
- Strongest: 7.7 M_{w} Taiwan
- Deadliest: 7.7 M_{w} Taiwan; 5 deaths
- Total fatalities: 5

Number by magnitude
- 8.0–8.9: 0
- 7.0–7.9: 2
- 6.0–6.9: 1

Date	Country and location	M_{w}	Depth (km)	MMI	Notes	Casualties	
Date	Country and location	M_{w}	Depth (km)	MMI	Notes	Dead	Injured
1	Taiwan, east of	7.7	20.0	VII	5 people were killed and another 7 were injured. 139 homes were destroyed.	5	7
4	Brazil, Acre (state)	6.7	635.8				
14	Taiwan, east of	7.0	25.0	VI			

=== October ===
October
- Strongest: 7.6 M_{w} Peru
- Total fatalities: 0

Number by magnitude
- 8.0–8.9: 0
- 7.0–7.9: 3
- 6.0–6.9: 3

Date	Country and location	M_{w}	Depth (km)	MMI	Notes	Casualties	
Date	Country and location	M_{w}	Depth (km)	MMI	Notes	Dead	Injured
11	Peru, Arequipa Region	7.6	160.0	VII	Many homes were damaged or destroyed in the area.		
14	Taiwan, Hsinchu County	7.0	15.0	VII			
16	China, southern Xinjiang Province	6.6	10.0	VII			
17	India, Andaman Sea	6.4	20.0				
24	Russian SFSR, Kuril Islands	7.3	35.0		Some damage was reported.		
27	Taiwan, Hualien County	6.7	15.0	VII			

=== November ===
November
- Strongest: 8.5 M_{w} Chile
- Deadliest: 8.5 M_{w} Chile; 700 deaths
- Total fatalities: 700

Number by magnitude
- 8.0–8.9: 1
- 7.0–7.9: 1
- 6.0–6.9: 2

Date	Country and location	M_{w}	Depth (km)	MMI	Notes	Casualties	
Date	Country and location	M_{w}	Depth (km)	MMI	Notes	Dead	Injured
7	Chile, Atacama Region	7.0	25.0	VI			
11	Chile, Atacama Region	8.5	70.0	XI	Due to the 1922 Vallenar earthquake 700 people lost their lives. Most (500) were from the earthquake but a fair proportion (200) were due to a tsunami. Many homes were destroyed.	700	
11	Chile, Atacama Region	6.7	35.0	VII	Aftershock.		
17	Chile, off the coast of Coquimbo Region	6.8	15.0	V	Aftershock.		

=== December ===
December
- Strongest: 7.3 M_{w} Afghanistan
- Total fatalities: 0

Number by magnitude
- 8.0–8.9: 0
- 7.0–7.9: 1
- 6.0–6.9: 7

Date	Country and location	M_{w}	Depth (km)	MMI	Notes	Casualties	
Date	Country and location	M_{w}	Depth (km)	MMI	Notes	Dead	Injured
6	Afghanistan, Badakhshan Province	7.3	239.9				
7	Japan, off the west coast of Kyushu	6.7	15.0	VI	1922 Shimabara earthquake		
8	Japan, off the west coast of Kyushu	6.5	5.0		Aftershock.		
8	Japan, off the east coast of Honshu	6.7	15.0	VI			
17	Afghanistan, Badakhshan Province	6.2	210.0				
18	United States, north of Puerto Rico	6.2	35.0				
25	New Zealand, Canterbury region, South Island	6.3	0.0	VII	Unknown depth.		
31	Russian SFSR, Kuril Islands	6.9	35.0				
