= Flinn-Engdahl regionalization =

The Flinn-Engdahl regions (or F-E regions) comprise a set of contiguous seismic zones which cover the Earth's surface. In seismology, they are the standard for localizing earthquakes. The scheme was proposed in 1965 by Edward A. Flinn and E. R. Engdahl. The first official definition was published in 1974 and later revised in 1995. Since that time, region outlines and numbers have remained unchanged, but region names have changed to reflect official place name changes, e.g. the Queen Charlotte Islands have been known as Haida Gwaii since 2010.

Because each F-E region is composed of 1x1 degree blocks with integer latitudes and longitudes, the borders of the F-E regions may differ from political boundaries. For instance, the F-E region 545 ("Northern Italy") also includes parts of France, Switzerland, Austria and Slovenia. After the 1995 revision there are 754 F-E regions, sequentially numbered from 1 to 757 with three gaps (172, 299 and 550) at dissolved regions. The seismic regions are grouped into 50 larger geographic regions.

Flinn-Engdahl regions of Presgrave, Aichele, Wiens & Flinn (1996) in pink, with region numbers in red, shown against coastlines in blue and administrative boundaries in black and grey.

Flinn-Engdahl regions in geoJSON format.

== List of seismic regions ==
Number	Region	Notes
=== Alaska – Aleutian arc ===
1	Central Alaska	
2	Southern Alaska	
3	Bering Sea	
4	Komandorsky Islands Region	
5	Near Islands, Aleutian Islands	
6	Rat Islands, Aleutian Islands	
7	Andreanof Islands, Aleutian Islands	
8	Pribilof Islands, Alaska Region	
9	Fox Islands, Aleutian Islands	
10	Unimak Island Region, Alaska	
11	Bristol Bay	
12	Alaska Peninsula	
13	Kodiak Island Region, Alaska	
14	Kenai Peninsula, Alaska	
15	Gulf of Alaska	
16	South of Aleutian Islands	
17	South of Alaska	
=== Southeastern Alaska to Washington ===
18	Southern Yukon Territory, Canada	
19	Southeastern Alaska	
20	Off Coast of Southeastern Alaska	
21	West of Vancouver Island	
22	Haida Gwaii Region	islands renamed in 2010
23	British Columbia, Canada	
24	Alberta, Canada	
25	Vancouver Island, Canada Region	
26	Off Coast of Washington	
27	Near Coast of Washington	
28	Washington–Oregon Border Region	
29	Washington	
=== Oregon, California and Nevada ===
30	Off Coast of Oregon	
31	Near Coast of Oregon	
32	Oregon	
33	Western Idaho	
34	Off Coast of Northern California	
35	Near Coast of Northern California	
36	Northern California	
37	Nevada	
38	Off Coast of California	
39	Central California	
40	California–Nevada Border Region	
41	Southern Nevada	
42	Western Arizona	
43	Southern California	
44	California–Arizona Border Region	
45	California–Baja California Border Region	
46	Western Arizona–Sonora Border Region	
=== Baja California and Gulf of California ===
47	Off Western Coast of Baja California	
48	Baja California, Mexico	
49	Gulf of California	
50	Sonora, Mexico	
51	Off Coast of Central Mexico	
52	Near Coast of Central Mexico	
=== Mexico – Guatemala area ===
53	Revillagigedo Islands Region	
54	Off Coast of Jalisco, Mexico	
55	Near Coast of Jalisco, Mexico	
56	Near Coast of Michoacan, Mexico	
57	Michoacan, Mexico	
58	Near Coast of Guerrero, Mexico	
59	Guerrero, Mexico	
60	Oaxaca, Mexico	
61	Chiapas, Mexico	
62	Mexico–Guatemala Border Region	
63	Off Coast of Mexico	in 1995 divided into regions 63 and 730
64	Off Coast of Michoacan, Mexico	
65	Off Coast of Guerrero, Mexico	
66	Near Coast of Oaxaca, Mexico	
67	Off Coast of Oaxaca, Mexico	
68	Off Coast of Chiapas, Mexico	
69	Near Coast of Chiapas, Mexico	
70	Guatemala	
71	Near Coast of Guatemala	
730	Northern East Pacific Rise	created in 1995 from a part of region 63
=== Central America ===
72	Honduras	
73	El Salvador	
74	Near Coast of Nicaragua	
75	Nicaragua	
76	Off Coast of Central America	
77	Off Coast of Costa Rica	
78	Costa Rica	
79	North of Panama	
80	Panama–Costa Rica Border Region	
81	Panama	
82	Panama–Colombia Border Region	
83	South of Panama	
=== Caribbean loop ===
84	Yucatán Peninsula, Mexico	
85	Cuba Region	
86	Jamaica Region	
87	Haiti Region	
88	Dominican Republic Region	
89	Mona Passage	
90	Puerto Rico Region	
91	Virgin Islands	
92	Leeward Islands	
93	Belize	
94	Caribbean Sea	in 1995 divided into regions 94 and 731
95	Windward Islands	
96	Near North Coast of Colombia	
97	Near Coast of Venezuela	
98	Trinidad	
99	Northern Colombia	
100	Lake Maracaibo, Venezuela	
101	Venezuela	
731	North of Honduras	created in 1995 from a part of region 94
=== Andean South America ===
102	Near West Coast of Colombia	
103	Colombia	
104	Off Coast of Ecuador	
105	Near Coast of Ecuador	
106	Colombia–Ecuador Border Region	
107	Ecuador	
108	Off Coast of Northern Peru	
109	Near Coast of Northern Peru	
110	Peru–Ecuador Border Region	
111	Northern Peru	
112	Peru–Brazil Border Region	
113	Western Brazil	
114	Off Coast of Peru	
115	Near Coast of Peru	
116	Central Peru	
117	Southern Peru	
118	Peru–Bolivia Border Region	
119	Northern Bolivia	
120	Central Bolivia	
121	Off Coast of Northern Chile	
122	Near Coast of Northern Chile	
123	Northern Chile	
124	Chile–Bolivia Border Region	
125	Southern Bolivia	
126	Paraguay	
127	Chile–Argentina Border Region	
128	Jujuy Province, Argentina	
129	Salta Province, Argentina	
130	Catamarca Province, Argentina	
131	Tucuman Province, Argentina	
132	Santiago Del Estero Province, Argentina	
133	Northeastern Argentina	
134	Off Coast of Central Chile	
135	Near Coast of Central Chile	
136	Central Chile	
137	San Juan Province, Argentina	
138	La Rioja Province, Argentina	
139	Mendoza Province, Argentina	
140	San Luis Province, Argentina	
141	Cordoba Province, Argentina	
142	Uruguay	
=== Extreme South America ===
143	Off Coast of Southern Chile	
144	Southern Chile	
145	Southern Chile–Argentina Border Region	
146	Southern Argentina	
=== Southern Antilles ===
147	Tierra Del Fuego	
148	Falkland Islands Region	
149	Drake Passage	
150	Scotia Sea	
151	South Georgia Island Region	
152	South Georgia Rise	
153	South Sandwich Islands Region	
154	South Shetland Islands	
155	Antarctic Peninsula	
156	Southwestern Atlantic Ocean	in 1995 divided into regions 156 and 732
157	Weddell Sea	
732	East of South Sandwich Islands	created in 1995 from a part of region 156
=== New Zealand region ===
158	Off West Coast of North Island, New Zealand	
159	North Island, New Zealand	
160	Off East Coast of North Island, New Zealand	
161	Off West Coast of South Island, New Zealand	
162	South Island, New Zealand	
163	Cook Strait, New Zealand	
164	Off East Coast of South Island, New Zealand	
165	North of Macquarie Island	
166	Auckland Islands, New Zealand Region	
167	Macquarie Island Region	
168	South of New Zealand	
=== Kermadec – Tonga – Samoa Basin area ===
169	Samoa Islands Region	
170	Samoa Islands	
171	South of Fiji Islands	merged with region 172 in 1995
172	West of Tonga Islands	abandoned in 1995
173	Tonga Islands	
174	Tonga Islands Region	
175	South of Tonga Islands	
176	North of New Zealand	
177	Kermadec Islands Region	
178	Kermadec Islands, New Zealand	
179	South of Kermadec Islands	
=== Fiji Islands area ===
180	North of Fiji Islands	
181	Fiji Islands Region	
182	Fiji Islands	
=== Vanuatu Islands ===
183	Santa Cruz Islands Region	
184	Santa Cruz Islands	
185	Vanuatu Islands Region	
186	Vanuatu Islands	
187	New Caledonia	
188	Loyalty Islands	
189	Southeast of Loyalty Islands	
=== Bismarck and Solomon Islands ===
190	New Ireland Region, Papua New Guinea	
191	North of Solomon Islands	
192	New Britain Region, Papua New Guinea	
193	Solomon Islands	
194	D'Entrecasteaux Islands Region	
195	South of Solomon Islands	
=== New Guinea ===
196	West Papua Region, Indonesia	province renamed in 1999
197	Near North Coast of West Papua	province renamed in 1999
198	Ninigo Islands Region, Papua New Guinea	
199	Admiralty Islands Region, Papua New Guinea	
200	Near North Coast of New Guinea, Papua New Guinea	
201	West Papua, Indonesia	province renamed in 1999
202	New Guinea, Papua New Guinea	
203	Bismarck Sea	
204	Aru Islands Region, Indonesia	
205	Near South Coast of West Papua	province renamed in 1999
206	Near South Coast of New Guinea, Papua New Guinea	
207	Eastern New Guinea Region, Papua New Guinea	
208	Arafura Sea	
=== Caroline Islands area ===
209	Western Caroline Islands, Micronesia	
210	South of Mariana Islands	
=== Guam to Japan ===
211	Southeast of Honshu, Japan	
212	Bonin Islands, Japan Region	
213	Volcano Islands, Japan Region	
214	West of Mariana Islands	
215	Mariana Islands Region	
216	Mariana Islands	
=== Japan – Kuril Islands – Kamchatka Peninsula ===
217	Kamchatka Peninsula, Russia	
218	Near East Coast of Kamchatka	
219	Off East Coast of Kamchatka	
220	Northwest of Kuril Islands	
221	Kuril Islands	
222	East of Kuril Islands	
223	Eastern Sea of Japan	
224	Hokkaido, Japan Region	
225	Off Coast of Hokkaido, Japan	
226	Near West Coast of Honshu, Japan	
227	Eastern Honshu, Japan	
228	Near East Coast of Honshu, Japan	
229	Off East Coast of Honshu, Japan	
230	Near South Coast of Honshu, Japan	
=== Southwestern Japan and Ryukyu Islands ===
231	South Korea	
232	Western Honshu, Japan	
233	Near South Coast of Western Honshu	
234	Northwest of Ryukyu Islands	
235	Kyushu, Japan	
236	Shikoku, Japan	
237	Southeast of Shikoku, Japan	
238	Ryukyu Islands, Japan	
239	Southeast of Ryukyu Islands	
240	West of Bonin Islands	
241	Philippine Sea	
=== Taiwan area ===
242	Near Coast of southeastern China	
243	Taiwan Region	
244	Taiwan	
245	Northeast of Taiwan	
246	Southwestern Ryukyu Islands, Japan	
247	Southeast of Taiwan	
=== Philippine Islands ===
248	Philippine Islands Region	
249	Luzon, Philippines	
250	Mindoro, Philippines	
251	Samar, Philippines	
252	Palawan, Philippines	
253	Sulu Sea	
254	Panay, Philippines	
255	Cebu, Philippines	
256	Leyte, Philippines	
257	Negros, Philippines	
258	Sulu Archipelago, Philippines	
259	Mindanao, Philippines	
260	East of Philippine Islands	
=== Borneo – Sulawesi ===
261	Borneo	
262	Celebes Sea	
263	Talaud Islands, Indonesia	
264	North of Halmahera, Indonesia	
265	Minahassa Peninsula, Sulawesi	
266	Northern Molucca Sea	
267	Halmahera, Indonesia	
268	Sulawesi, Indonesia	
269	Southern Molucca Sea	
270	Ceram Sea	
271	Buru, Indonesia	
272	Seram, Indonesia	
=== Sunda arc ===
273	Southwest of Sumatra, Indonesia	
274	Southern Sumatra, Indonesia	
275	Java Sea	
276	Sunda Strait, Indonesia	
277	Java, Indonesia	
278	Bali Sea	
279	Flores Sea	
280	Banda Sea	
281	Tanimbar Islands Region, Indonesia	
282	South of Java, Indonesia	
283	Bali Region, Indonesia	
284	South of Bali, Indonesia	
285	Sumbawa Region, Indonesia	
286	Flores Region, Indonesia	
287	Sumba Region, Indonesia	
288	Savu Sea	
289	Timor Region	
290	Timor Sea	
291	South of Sumbawa, Indonesia	
292	South of Sumba, Indonesia	
293	South of Timor, Indonesia	
=== Myanmar and Southeast Asia ===
294	Myanmar–India Border Region	
295	Myanmar–Bangladesh Border Region	
296	Myanmar	
297	Myanmar–China Border Region	
298	Near South Coast of Myanmar	
299	Southeast Asia	abandoned in 1995
300	Hainan Island, China	
301	South China Sea	
733	Thailand	created in 1995 from a part of region 299
734	Laos	created in 1995 from a part of region 299
735	Cambodia	created in 1995 from a part of region 299
736	Vietnam	created in 1995 from a part of region 299
737	Gulf of Tonkin	created in 1995 from a part of region 299
=== India – Xizang – Sichuan – Yunnan ===
302	Eastern Kashmir	
303	Kashmir–India Border Region	
304	Kashmir–Xizang Border Region	
305	Western Xizang–India Border Region	
306	Xizang	
307	Sichuan, China	
308	Northern India	
309	Nepal-India Border Region	
310	Nepal	
311	Sikkim, India	
312	Bhutan	
313	Eastern Xizang–India Border Region	
314	Southern India	
315	India–Bangladesh Border Region	
316	Bangladesh	
317	Northeastern India	
318	Yunnan, China	
319	Bay of Bengal	
=== Southern Xinjiang to Gansu ===
320	Kyrgyzstan–Xinjiang Border Region	
321	Southern Xinjiang, China	
322	Gansu, China	
323	Western Nei Mongol, China	
324	Kashmir–Xinjiang Border Region	
325	Qinghai, China	
=== Lake Issyk-Kul to Lake Baykal ===
326	Southwestern Siberia, Russia	
327	Lake Baikal Region, Russia	
328	East of Lake Baikal, Russia	
329	Eastern Kazakhstan	
330	Lake Issyk-Kul region	
331	Kazakhstan–Xinjiang Border Region	
332	Northern Xinjiang, China	
333	Russia–Mongolia Border Region	
334	Mongolia	
=== Western Asia ===
335	Ural Mountains Region, Russia	
336	Western Kazakhstan	
337	Eastern Caucasus	
338	Caspian Sea	
339	Northwestern Uzbekistan	
340	Turkmenistan	
341	Turkmenistan–Iran Border Region	
342	Turkmenistan–Afghanistan Border Region	
343	Türkiye –Iran Border Region	
344	Armenia–Azerbaijan–Iran Border Region	
345	Northwestern Iran	
346	Iran–Iraq Border Region	
347	Western Iran	
348	Northern and Central Iran	
349	Northwestern Afghanistan	
350	Southwestern Afghanistan	
351	Eastern Arabian Peninsula	
352	Persian Gulf	
353	Southern Iran	
354	Southwestern Pakistan	
355	Gulf of Oman	
356	Off Coast of Pakistan	
=== Middle East – Crimea – Eastern Balkans ===
357	Ukraine–Moldova–Southwestern Russia Region	
358	Romania	
359	Bulgaria	
360	Black Sea	
361	Crimea Region, Ukraine	
362	Western Caucasus	
363	Greece–Bulgaria Border Region	
364	Greece	
365	Aegean Sea	
366	Türkiye	
367	Georgia–Armenia–Türkiye Border Region	
368	Southern Greece	
369	Dodecanese Islands, Greece	
370	Crete, Greece	
371	Eastern Mediterranean Sea	
372	Cyprus Region	
373	Dead Sea Region	
374	Jordan–Syria Region	
375	Iraq	
=== Western Mediterranean area ===
376	Portugal	
377	Spain	
378	Pyrenees	
379	Near South Coast of France	
380	Corsica, France	
381	Central Italy	
382	Adriatic Sea	
383	Northwestern Balkan Region	
384	West of Gibraltar	
385	Strait of Gibraltar	
386	Balearic Islands, Spain	
387	Western Mediterranean Sea	
388	Sardinia, Italy	
389	Tyrrhenian Sea	
390	Southern Italy	
391	Albania	
392	Greece–Albania Border Region	
393	Madeira Islands, Portugal Region	
394	Canary Islands, Spain Region	
395	Morocco	
396	Northern Algeria	
397	Tunisia	
398	Sicily, Italy	
399	Ionian Sea	
400	Central Mediterranean Sea	
401	Near Coast of Libya	
=== Atlantic Ocean ===
402	North Atlantic Ocean	in 1995 divided into regions 402, 738 and 739
403	Northern Mid-Atlantic Ridge	
404	Azores Islands Region	
405	Azores Islands, Portugal	
406	Central Mid-Atlantic Ridge	
407	North of Ascension Island	
408	Ascension Island Region	
409	South Atlantic Ocean	
410	Southern Mid-Atlantic Ridge	
411	Tristan Da Cunha Region	
412	Bouvet Island Region	
413	Southwest of Africa	
414	Southeastern Atlantic Ocean	
738	Reykjanes Ridge	created in 1995 from a part of region 402
739	Azores-Cape St. Vincent Ridge	created in 1995 from a part of region 402
=== Indian Ocean ===
415	Eastern Gulf of Aden	
416	Socotra Region	
417	Arabian Sea	in 1995 divided into regions 417 and 740
418	Lakshadweep Region, India	
419	Northeastern Somalia	
420	North Indian Ocean	
421	Carlsberg Ridge	
422	Maldive Islands Region	
423	Laccadive Sea	
424	Sri Lanka	
425	South Indian Ocean	in 1995 divided into regions 425, 741 and 742
426	Chagos Archipelago Region	
427	Mauritius-Réunion Region	
428	Southwest Indian Ridge	
429	Mid-Indian Ridge	
430	South of Africa	
431	Prince Edward Islands Region	
432	Crozet Islands Region	
433	Kerguelen Islands Region	
434	Broken Ridge	
435	Southeast Indian Ridge	in 1995 enlarged by a part of region 437
436	Southern Kerguelen Plateau	
437	South of Australia	in 1995 divided into part of region 435 and region 437
740	Owen Fracture Zone Region	created in 1995 from a part of region 417
741	Indian Ocean Triple junction	created in 1995 from a part of region 425
742	Western Indian-Antarctic Ridge	created in 1995 from a part of region 425
=== Eastern North America ===
438	Saskatchewan, Canada	
439	Manitoba, Canada	
440	Hudson Bay	
441	Ontario, Canada	
442	Hudson Strait Region, Canada	
443	Northern Québec, Canada	
444	Davis Strait	
445	Labrador, Canada	
446	Labrador Sea	
447	Southern Québec, Canada	
448	Gaspe Peninsula, Canada	
449	Eastern Québec, Canada	
450	Anticosti Island, Canada	
451	New Brunswick, Canada	
452	Nova Scotia, Canada	
453	Prince Edward Island, Canada	
454	Gulf of St. Lawrence	
455	Newfoundland, Canada	
456	Montana	
457	Eastern Idaho	
458	Hebgen Lake Region	
459	Yellowstone Region, Wyoming	
460	Wyoming	
461	North Dakota	
462	South Dakota	
463	Nebraska	
464	Minnesota	
465	Iowa	
466	Wisconsin	
467	Illinois	
468	Michigan	
469	Indiana	
470	Southern Ontario, Canada	
471	Ohio	
472	New York	
473	Pennsylvania	
474	Vermont–New Hampshire Region	
475	Maine	
476	Southern New England	
477	Gulf of Maine	
478	Utah	
479	Colorado	
480	Kansas	
481	Iowa–Missouri Border Region	
482	Missouri–Kansas Border Region	
483	Missouri	
484	Missouri–Arkansas Border Region	
485	Eastern Missouri	
486	New Madrid, Missouri Region	
487	Cape Girardeau, Missouri Region	
488	Southern Illinois	
489	Southern Indiana	
490	Kentucky	
491	West Virginia	
492	Virginia	
493	Chesapeake Bay Region	
494	New Jersey	
495	Eastern Arizona	
496	New Mexico	
497	Texas Panhandle Region	
498	Western Texas	
499	Oklahoma	
500	Central Texas	
501	Arkansas–Oklahoma Border Region	
502	Arkansas	
503	Louisiana–Texas Border Region	
504	Louisiana	
505	Mississippi	
506	Tennessee	
507	Alabama	
508	Western Florida	
509	Georgia, USA	
510	Florida-Georgia Border Region	
511	South Carolina	
512	North Carolina	
513	Off East Coast of United States	
514	Florida Peninsula	
515	Bahama Islands	
516	Eastern Arizona-Sonora Border Region	
517	New Mexico-Chihuahua Border Region	
518	Texas-Mexico Border Region	
519	Southern Texas	
520	Near Coast of Texas	
521	Chihuahua, Mexico	
522	Northern Mexico	
523	Central Mexico	
524	Jalisco, Mexico	
525	Veracruz, Mexico	
526	Gulf of Mexico	
527	Bay of Campeche	
=== Eastern South America ===
528	Brazil	
529	Guyana	
530	Suriname	
531	French Guiana	
=== Northwestern Europe ===
532	Ireland	
533	United Kingdom	
534	North Sea	
535	Southern Norway	
536	Sweden	
537	Baltic Sea	
538	France	
539	Bay of Biscay	
540	The Netherlands	
541	Belgium	
542	Denmark	
543	Germany	
544	Switzerland	
545	Northern Italy	
546	Austria	
547	Czechia and Slovakia	
548	Poland	
549	Hungary	
=== Africa ===
550	Northwest Africa	abandoned in 1995
551	Southern Algeria	
552	Libya	
553	Egypt	
554	Red Sea	
555	Western Arabian Peninsula	
556	Chad Region	
557	Sudan	
558	Ethiopia	
559	Western Gulf of Aden	
560	Northwestern Somalia	
561	Off South Coast of Northwest Africa	
562	Cameroon	
563	Equatorial Guinea	
564	Central African Republic	
565	Gabon	
566	Republic of Congo	
567	Democratic Republic of Congo	
568	Uganda	
569	Lake Victoria Region	
570	Kenya	
571	Southern Somalia	
572	Lake Tanganjika Region	
573	Tanzania	
574	Northwest of Madagascar	
575	Angola	
576	Zambia	
577	Malawi	
578	Namibia	
579	Botswana	
580	Zimbabwe	
581	Mozambique	
582	Mozambique Channel	
583	Madagascar	
584	South Africa	
585	Lesotho	
586	Swaziland	
587	Off Coast of South Africa	
743	Western Sahara	created in 1995 from a part of region 550
744	Mauritania	created in 1995 from a part of region 550
745	Mali	created in 1995 from a part of region 550
746	Senegal-Gambia Region	created in 1995 from a part of region 550
747	Guinea Region	created in 1995 from a part of region 550
748	Sierra Leone	created in 1995 from a part of region 550
749	Liberia Region	created in 1995 from a part of region 550
750	Côte d'Ivoire	created in 1995 from a part of region 550
751	Burkina Faso	created in 1995 from a part of region 550
752	Ghana	created in 1995 from a part of region 550
753	Benin-Togo Region	created in 1995 from a part of region 550
754	Niger	created in 1995 from a part of region 550
755	Nigeria	created in 1995 from a part of region 550
=== Australia ===
588	Northwest of Australia	
589	West of Australia	
590	Western Australia	
591	Northern Territory, Australia	
592	South Australia	
593	Gulf of Carpentaria	
594	Queensland, Australia	
595	Coral Sea	
596	Northwest of New Caledonia	
597	Southwest of New Caledonia	
598	Southwest of Australia	
599	Off South Coast of Australia	
600	Near Coast of South Australia	
601	New South Wales, Australia	
602	Victoria, Australia	
603	Near Southeastern Coast of Australia	
604	Near East Coast of Australia	
605	East of Australia	
606	Norfolk Island Region	
607	Northwest of New Zealand	
608	Bass Strait	
609	Tasmania Region, Australia Region	
610	Southeast of Australia	
=== Pacific Basin ===
611	North Pacific Ocean	
612	Hawaiian Islands Region	
613	Hawaii	
614	Eastern Caroline Islands, Micronesia	
615	Marshall Islands Region	
616	Enewetak Atoll Region, Marshall Islands	
617	Bikini Atoll Region, Marshall Islands	
618	Gilbert Islands, Kiribati Region	
619	Johnston Island Region	
620	Line Islands Region, Kiribati	
621	Palmyra Island Region, Kiribati	
622	Kiritimati Region, Kiribati	
623	Tuvalu Region	
624	Phoenix Islands, Kiribati Region	
625	Tokelau Islands Region	
626	Northern Cook Islands	
627	Cook Islands Region	
628	Society Islands Region	
629	Tubuai Islands Region	
630	Marquesas Islands Region	
631	Tuamotu Archipelago Region	
632	South Pacific Ocean	
=== Arctic zone ===
633	Lomonosov Ridge	
634	Arctic Ocean	
635	Near North Coast of Greenland	
636	Eastern Greenland	
637	Iceland Region	
638	Iceland	
639	Jan Mayen Island Region	
640	Greenland Sea	
641	North of Svalbard	
642	Norwegian Sea	
643	Svalbard Region	
644	North of Franz Josef Land	
645	Franz Josef Land, Russia	
646	Northern Norway	
647	Barents Sea	
648	Novaya Zemlya, Russia	
649	Kara Sea	
650	Near Coast of Western Siberia, Russia	
651	North of Severnaya Zemlya	
652	Severnaya Zemlya, Russia	
653	Near Coast of Central Siberia, Russia	
654	East of Severnaya Zemlya, Russia	
655	Laptev Sea	
=== Eastern Asia ===
656	Southeastern Siberia, Russia	
657	Eastern Russia-Northeastern China Border Region	
658	Northeastern China	
659	North Korea	
660	Sea of Japan	
661	Primor'ye, Russia	
662	Sakhalin, Russia	
663	Sea of Okhotsk	
664	Southeastern China	
665	Yellow Sea	
666	Off East Coast of Eastern China	
=== Northeastern Asia, Northern Alaska to Greenland ===
667	North of New Siberian Islands	
668	New Siberian Islands, Russia	
669	East Siberian Sea	
670	Near North Coast of Eastern Siberia	
671	Eastern Siberia, Russia	
672	Chukchi Sea	
673	Bering Strait	
674	St. Lawrence Island, Alaska Region	
675	Beaufort Sea	
676	Northern Alaska	
677	Northern Yukon Territory, Canada	
678	Queen Elizabeth Islands, Canada	
679	Northwest Territories -- Nunavut, Canada	Nunavut was founded in 1999
680	Western Greenland	
681	Baffin Bay	
682	Baffin Island Region, Canada	
=== Southeastern and Antarctic Pacific Ocean ===
683	Southeast Central Pacific Ocean	
684	Southern East Pacific Rise	
685	Easter Island Region	
686	West Chile Rise	
687	Juan Fernandez Islands Region	
688	East of North Island, New Zealand	
689	Chatham Islands, New Zealand Region	
690	South of Chatham Islands	
691	Pacific-Antarctic Ridge	
692	Southern Pacific Ocean	in 1995 divided into regions 692 and 756
756	Southeast of Easter Island	created in 1995 from a part of region 692
=== Galápagos Islands area ===
693	East Central Pacific Ocean	in 1995 divided into regions 693 and 757
694	Central East Pacific Rise	
695	West of Galápagos Islands	
696	Galápagos Islands Region	
697	Galápagos Islands, Ecuador	
698	Southwest of Galápagos Islands	
699	Southeast of Galápagos Islands	
757	Galápagos Triple Junction Region	created in 1995 from a part of region 693
=== Macquarie loop ===
700	South of Tasmania	
701	West of Macquarie Island	
702	Balleny Islands Region	
=== Andaman Islands to Sumatra ===
703	Andaman Islands, India Region	
704	Nicobar Islands, India Region	
705	Off West Coast of Northern Sumatra	
706	Northern Sumatra, Indonesia	
707	Malay Peninsula	
708	Gulf of Thailand	
=== Baluchistan ===
709	Southeastern Afghanistan	
710	Pakistan	
711	Southwestern Kashmir	
712	India-Pakistan Border Region	
=== Hindu Kush and Pamir area ===
713	Central Kazakhstan	
714	Southeastern Uzbekistan	
715	Tajikistan	
716	Kyrgyzstan	
717	Afghanistan-Tajikistan Border Region	
718	Hindu Kush Region, Afghanistan	
719	Tajikistan-Xinjiang Border Region	
720	Northwestern Kashmir	
=== Northern Eurasia ===
721	Finland	
722	Norway-Russia Border Region	
723	Finland-Russia Border Region	
724	Baltic-Belarus-Northwestern Russia Region	
725	Northwestern Siberia, Russia	
726	Northcentral Siberia, Russia	
=== Antarctica ===
727	Victoria Land, Antarctica	
728	Ross Sea	
729	Antarctica	
