= 1837 Valdivia earthquake =

Earthquake and tsunami in Chile

- Location within Chile
- Local date: November 7, 1837
- Magnitude: 8.8–9.5 M_{w} (Note: ...likely tsunami heights in 1837 falls between the highest levels reached by the 2010 tsunami and the lowest in 1960 along the same stretch of the Japanese coast (Fig.4a). According to the robust relationship inferred between the magnitudes of Chilean earthquakes and the amplitudes of their tsunamis in Japan (Carvajalet al., 2017), a range of ~1–2 m suggests that the magnitude of the 1837 earthquake was likely between Mw 8.8 and 9.5. This rough estimation also agrees with the tsunami magnitude of 9 1/4 assigned to the 1837 event by Abe (1979).)
- Epicenter: 39.813889°S 73.245833°W
- Areas affected: Chile
- Tsunami: yes
- Casualties: 14

The 1837 Valdivia earthquake struck south-central Chile on November 7. Together with earthquakes in 1575 and 1737 the earthquake is among the historical predecessors to the great 1960 earthquake. The rupture zone was roughly from Valdivia to the south. It was felt in the cities of Concepción, Valdivia and Ancud. The earthquake was also felt by the crew of whaling ships in Guafo Island and Chonos Archipelago. Various landslides were triggered in Chiloé and people are reported to have been thrown to the ground in Valdivia. In contrast in Concepción the shakings were moderate. As reported in various coastal localities the ground rose as a result of the earthquake. Decades later while surveying southern Chile's coasts Francisco Vidal Gormaz was told of islands that had been submerged and some that had emerged as a consequence of the earthquake. The earthquake caused a tsunami that struck Hawaii, what is now French Polynesia, and Japan. At Hilo, Hawaii, the tsunami destroyed 66 houses and caused the deaths of 14 inhabitants.

In Japan the tsunami flooded rice fields, destroyed salmon traps and broke into salt evaporation ponds causing significant economic losses.

== See also ==
- 1835 Concepción earthquake
- Tenpō famine
