= National Service for Disaster Prevention and Response =

Chilean public service responsible for disaster risk management

Servicio Nacional de Prevención y Respuesta ante Desastres
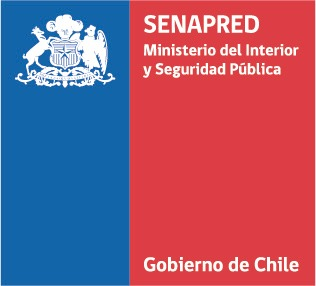

Public agency overview
- Jurisdiction: National
- Website: senapred.cl

The National Service for Disaster Prevention and Response (Spanish: Servicio Nacional de Prevención y Respuesta ante Desastres), often abbreviated as SENAPRED, is a Chilean public service responsible for advising, coordinating, organizing, planning, and supervising activities related to Disaster Risk Management in Chile. It was created by Law No. 21,364 in 2021 to replace the former National Emergency Office of the Ministry of the Interior (ONEMI), within the context of the reform of Chile's emergency management system.

== History ==
Following the earthquake on February 27, 2010, there emerged a clear necessity to reform Chile's emergency infrastructure. This infrastructure had remained unchanged since 1974, during the onset of the military dictatorship. This marked the beginning of a process of reforms in the sector, which culminated in the enactment of Law No. 21,364, published on August 7, 2021, replacing the former ONEMI with the National Service for Disaster Prevention and Response.

Its first intervention of national relevance was the emergency management response to the forest fires in Chile in 2023.

== Organization ==
The SENAPRED is a territorially decentralized public service with legal personality and its own assets. It is organized based on a national direction and regional directions in each of Chile's regions. It is subject to the supervision of the President of the Republic of Chile through the Ministry of the Interior and Public Security.

Its national director is Mauricio Tapia.

== See also ==
- Emergency Alert System
