= ONEMI =

National emergency management agency of Chile

Coordinates: 33°28′7″S 70°39′50″W

National Office of Emergency of the Interior Ministry
- Oficina Nacional de Emergencia del Ministerio del Interior
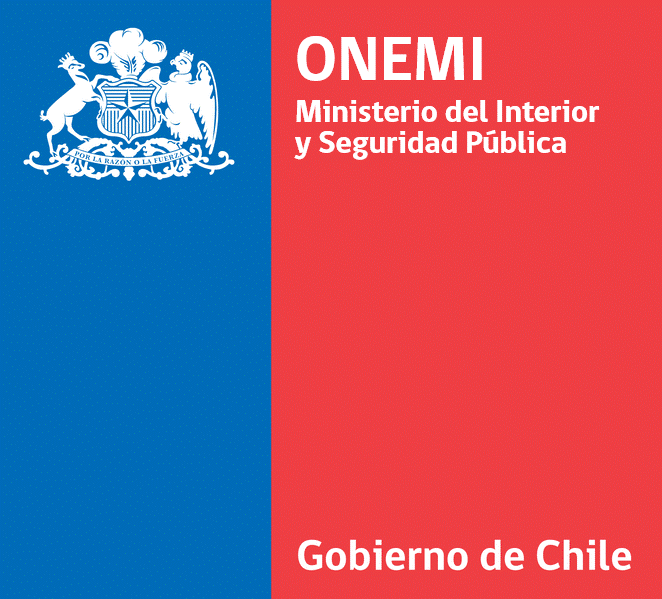

Agency overview
- Formed: 1974
- Type: Emergency management
- Jurisdiction: Government of Chile
- Headquarters: Beauchef 1671; Santiago
- Annual budget: US$21,030,236; CLP$16,660,147,000
- Ministers responsible: Ricardo Toro Tassara, Director; Cristóbal Mena, Assistant Director
- Parent agency: Ministry of the Interior and Public Security
- Website: Official website (in Spanish)

ONEMI or National Office of Emergency of the Interior Ministry (Spanish: Oficina Nacional de Emergencia del Ministerio del Interior) was a Chilean government agency dedicated to the prevention, organization, coordination and information relative to natural disasters. After the 1960 Valdivia earthquake a committee was formed to solve problems caused by the earthquake. However, this committee was not dissolved afterwards and in 1974, it acquired by law independent status as governmental office.

Other state funded agencies and services that cooperate with ONEMI are CONAF in terms related to forests and wildlife and OVDAS in monitoring volcanoes.

On 1 January 2023, it legally ceased to exist and was replaced by the current National Service for Disaster Prevention and Response (Senapred), as specified in Law No. 21,364.

== 2010 Chile earthquake and trial ==
ONEMI has faced severe criticism after the 2010 Chile earthquake, the largest earthquake in Chile since the 1960 Valdivia earthquake. Criticism include the lack of coordination with other authorities and the SHOA (Hydrographic and Oceanographic Service of the Chilean Navy). ONEMI, SHOA and the government have been accused of the initial neglect of the tsunami warning sent by the Pacific Tsunami Warning Center, which resulted in the deaths of hundreds of civilians. Currently several of the members from the SHOA and ONEMI are facing trial in the Chilean justice.

== See also ==
- Ministry of the Interior and Public Security (Chile)
- Francisca Cooper Integral Evacuation and School Safety Plan
