= 1922 Vallenar earthquake =

Earthquake in Chile

- Location within South America
- UTC time: 1922-11-11 04:32:51
- ISC event: 912062
- USGS-ANSS: ComCat
- Local date: 10 November 1922
- Local time: 23:53
- Magnitude: 8.3–8.6 M_{w}, 8.7 M_{t}
- Depth: 35.0 km (22 mi)
- Epicenter: 28.988°S 70.704°W
- Areas affected: Chile, Argentina
- Max. intensity: MMI XI (Extreme)
- Tsunami: Yes
- Casualties: 1,000 fatalities

The 1922 Vallenar earthquake occurred with a moment magnitude of 8.3-8.6 and a tsunami magnitude of 8.7 in the Atacama Region of Chile, near the border with Argentina on 10 November 1922 at 23:53 local time (11 November, 1922 at 04:32:51 UTC). It triggered a destructive tsunami that caused significant damage to the coast of Chile and was observed as far away as Australia.

== Tectonic setting ==
The earthquake took place along the tectonic plate boundaries between the Nazca plate and South American plate, at a location where their plate boundaries converge at a rate of seventy millimeters a year.

Chile is located on a convergent tectonic plate boundary that has generated megathrust earthquakes since the Paleozoic era (500 million years ago). Historically, the coast of Chile has seen many large megathrust earthquakes along this tectonic plate boundary, including the 1960 Valdivia earthquake (the strongest earthquake ever measured) and, more recently, the 2010 Chile earthquake, a magnitude 8.8 quake that occurred off of the coast of central Chile.

== Damage and deaths ==
The earthquake caused extensive damage in a zone extending approximately from Copiapó to Coquimbo. Newspapers estimated more than 1,000 dead as a result of the quake, at least 500 of them in Vallenar. The tsunami killed several hundred people in coastal cities, especially in Coquimbo.

Total damage was estimated to be in the range of $5–25 million U.S. (1922 dollars).

== Characteristics ==
=== Earthquake ===
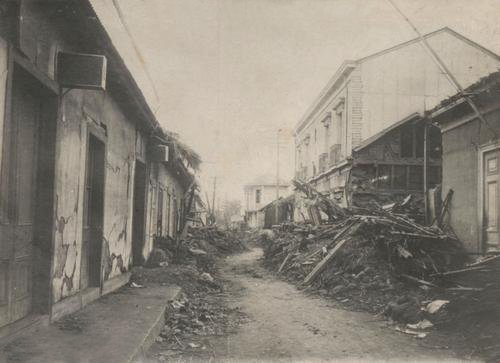
Damage in the Atacama Region

The earthquake was preceded by strong foreshocks on 3 November, 1922 and 7 November, 1922. The main shock lasted between thirty seconds and eight minutes according to various reports. A maximum Mercalli-Sieberg intensity of XI was assigned in Vallenar, Chile, while the surrounding region was assigned X. Shaking intensity decreased further west towards the coast, ranging from VII to IX. The location closest to the tsunami source, Caldera, Chile, was estimated to have a shaking intensity of VII, suggesting an inland earthquake source.

The earthquake was felt as far east as Buenos Aires, Argentina, where lights went out and clocks stopped.

A 2019 study in Geophysical Journal International suggested the earthquake ruptured the subduction zone interface. The tsunami triggered by the mainshock was large, and corresponded with a tsunami magnitude (M_{t}) of 8.7. Estimates of the moment magnitude range from 8.3 to 8.6. The length of the plate boundary that ruptured during the earthquake is estimated to be 300 to 450 km (190 to 280 mi).

=== Tsunami ===
The epicenter of the earthquake was well inland and the tsunami may have been caused by a underwater landslide triggered by the shaking.

The tsunami hit the cities of Caldera and Chañaral, located in the Atacama region of Chile, especially hard; both cities were destroyed by the tsunami. At Caldera, the tsunami began about 15 minutes after the earthquake, with a maximum run-up height of 7 m (23 ft). At Chañaral, the tsunami had a wave train (series of waves generated by the same earthquake) consisting of three wave events, the first about an hour after the earthquake, with a maximum run-up height of 9 m (30 ft). The tsunami also struck Coquimbo with a wave train consisting of three wave events, the last of the waves being the most destructive with a maximum run-up height of 7 m (23 ft).

The far-field tsunami was observed in Callao, Peru (2.4 m, 7.9 ft), California (0.2 m, 8 in; 13.0 hours delay), Hawaii (2.1 m, 6.9 ft; 14.5 hours delay), Samoa (0.9 m, 3 ft; 14.1 hours delay), Japan (0.3 m, 1 ft), Australia (0.2 m, 7.9 in), New Zealand (0.1 m, 3.9 in), the Philippines (0.1 m, 3.9 in), and Taiwan (0.03 m, 1 in).

== See also ==
- List of earthquakes in 1922
- List of earthquakes in Chile
- List of earthquakes in Argentina
