= 1420 Caldera earthquake =

Earthquake and tsunami in Chile

- Location within Chile
- UTC time: ??
- ISC event
- USGS-ANSS
- Local date: 31 August 1420
- Local time
- Magnitude: 8.8–9.4 M_{w}
- Epicenter: 27.0°S 71.0°W
- Areas affected: Chile
- Tsunami: Yes

The 1420 Caldera earthquake was a pre-Columbian earthquake that shook the southern portion of Atacama Desert in the early morning of 31 August 1420 and caused tsunamis in Chile as well as Hawaii and Japan. The earthquake's magnitude is estimated to be between 8.8 and 9.4.M_{w}. Historical records of the tsunami exist for the Japanese harbours of Kawarago and Aiga where confused residents saw the water recede in the morning of 1 September, without any sign of an earthquake. In Chile, rockfalls occurred along the coast as well, producing blocks of up to 40 tons that are now found inland. This is also consistent with the identification of a possible tsunami deposit in Mejillones Bay that has been dated to the range 1409 to 1449. Deposits found by coring of recent sediments in a wetland near Tongoy Bay have also been linked to the 1420 tsunami.

== See also ==
- List of historical earthquakes
- List of earthquakes in Chile
- List of earthquakes in Peru
