= 1730 Valparaíso earthquake =

Earthquake and tsunami in Valparaíso Region, Chile

- Location within Chile
- Local date: July 8, 1730
- Local time: 04:45
- Magnitude: 9.1–9.3 M_{w}, 8.75 M_{t}
- Epicenter: 32.5°S 71.5°W
- Areas affected: Captaincy General of Chile, Spanish Empire
- Tsunami: Yes
- Casualties: Unknown

The 1730 Valparaíso earthquake occurred at 04:45 local time (08:45 UTC) on July 8. It had an estimated magnitude of 9.1–9.3 and triggered a major tsunami with an estimated magnitude of M_{t} 8.75, that inundated the lower parts of Valparaíso. The earthquake caused severe damage from La Serena to Chillán, while the tsunami affected more than 1,000 km (620 mi) of Chile's coastline.

== Tectonic setting ==
The earthquake took place along the boundary between the Nazca and South American tectonic plates, at a location where they converge at a rate of seventy millimeters a year.

Chile has been at a convergent plate boundary that generates megathrust earthquakes since the Paleozoic (500 million years ago). In historical times the Chilean coast has suffered many megathrust earthquakes along this plate boundary, including the strongest earthquake ever measured. Most recently, the boundary ruptured in 2010 in central Chile.

== Damage ==
The earthquake caused severe damage over a wide area, Valparaíso, Coquimbo, Illapel, Petorca and Tiltil were all affected. The parish church in La Serena was destroyed.

Only a few deaths were recorded due to the earthquake, reportedly because a strong foreshock had caused people to leave their homes. The same is also true for the following tsunami with the inhabitants running to higher ground after seeing the water recede, so that only a few were killed.

== Characteristics ==
=== Earthquake ===
At about 01:00 local time in Santiago, there was a strong earthquake, followed by several smaller tremors. The main shock occurred at 4:45 local time.

A 350–550 km (220–340 mi) long rupture has been estimated for this event, from the extent of severe damage.

=== Tsunami ===
The tsunami occurred immediately after the mainshock, with a maximum run-up height recorded at Concepción of 16 m. It was also observed at Callao, Peru and in Honshu, Japan where fields were flooded in Rikuzen and the Oshika Peninsula.

== See also ==
- List of earthquakes in Chile
- List of historical earthquakes
