= List of earthquakes in Georgia =

This is an incomplete list of earthquakes in Georgia.

	Region	Date	Mag.	Intensity	Epicenter	Depth (km)	Deaths	Injuries	Source
2022	Lori, Armenia	February 13	5.3 M_{w}	VI	41.154°N 44.004°E	10		2	
2009	Racha	September 8	6.0 M_{w}	VII	42.66°N 43.44°E	15		1	
2002 Tbilisi earthquake	Tbilisi	April 25	4.8 M_{b}	VII–VIII	41.77°N 44.86°E	10	5–7	52–70	
1991 Racha earthquake	Racha	April 29	7.0 M_{w}	IX	42.45°N 43.67°E	17	270		
1920 Gori earthquake	Gori	February 20	6.2 M_{s}	IX	42.0°N 44.1°E	11	114–130		
1900	Tbilisi	January 4			41.77°N 44.86°E		>1,000	Many	
1283 Samtskhe earthquake	Samtskhe		7.0±0.5	IX-X	41.7°N 43.2°E				
1088 Tmogvi earthquake	Tmogvi	April 16 or 22	6.5 M_{s}		41.4°N 43.2°E		Many		
M_{w} = moment magnitude scale, M_{b} = body wave magnitude, and M_{s} = surface-wave magnitude. The inclusion criteria for adding events are based on WikiProject Earthquakes' notability guideline that was developed for stand alone articles. The principles described are also applicable to lists. In summary, only damaging, injurious, or deadly events should be recorded.

== See also ==
- Geology of Georgia (country)
