= 2002 Tbilisi earthquake =

Earthquake in Georgia

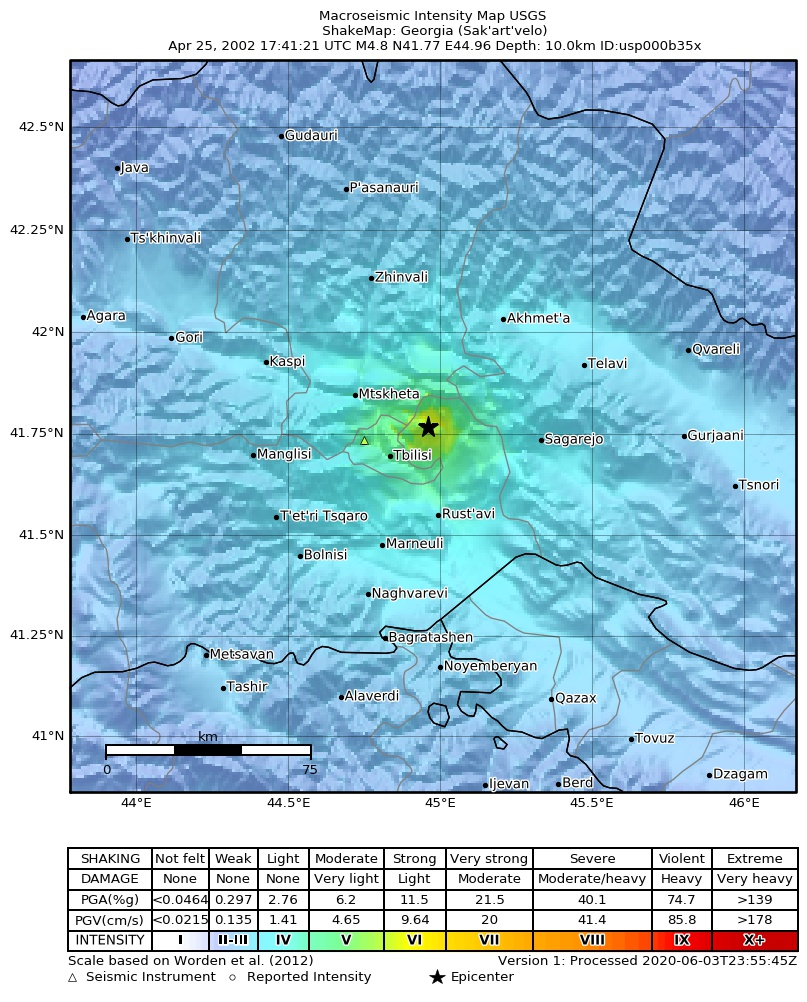
- USGS ShakeMap

- Location within Georgia
- UTC time: 2002-04-25 17:41:21
- ISC event: 3004606
- USGS-ANSS: ComCat
- Local date: April 25, 2002
- Local time: 21:41:21
- Magnitude: 4.8 mb^{(NEIC)} 4.3 M_{s}^{(NEIC)}
- Depth: 10 km (6 mi)
- Epicenter: 41.77°N 44.86°E
- Total damage: $160–350 million
- Max. intensity: MSK-64 VII–VIII
- Peak acceleration: 0.11 g
- Casualties: 5–7 dead 52–70 injured 1,086 displaced

The 2002 Tbilisi earthquake occurred on April 25 in the Caucasus country of Georgia. The United States' National Earthquake Information Center (NEIC) placed the magnitude at 4.3 M_{s} and 4.8 mb. This moderate magnitude event resulted in a maximum MSK intensity of VII (Very strong) to VIII (Damaging). An independent investigation estimated the total losses at $160 million (US) while the Centre for Research on the Epidemiology of Disasters estimated the total losses at $350 million. Between five and seven were killed, 52–70 were injured, and more than 1,000 were left homeless.

== Tectonic setting ==
Tbilisi lies near the northern boundary of the complex zone of deformation associated with the continuing collision between the Arabian plate and the Eurasian plate. To the north, the mountains of the Greater Caucasus are a result of active thrust tectonics, linking eastwards to the Apsheron sill. To the south, the Lesser Caucasus mountains are also a result of active thrust tectonics. The whole Caucasus region is affected by earthquakes, with the largest known being associated with the active front of the Greater Caucasus thrust belt, such as the 1991 Racha earthquake. Tbilisi itself has relatively low seismicity, although there are historical records of damaging earthquakes, such as the event in 1896, which had an estimated intensity of VII (MSK), the strongest known earthquake to have affected Tbilisi during historical times.

== Earthquake ==
The earthquake was preceded by a series of foreshocks, of which the largest was M 3.5 on April 11. The mainshock had an estimated magnitude of 4.7 mb (ISC), 4.8 mb (ANSS), 4.5 M_{s}, with an estimated hypocentral depth of 13.6 km (ISC), 10.0 km (ANSS), 5.0 km and 3.0 km. The mainshock produced higher intensity shaking than would normally be expected for an earthquake of that magnitude. The frequency was also unusually high (maximum 5 Hz) and the duration was short. The epicenter was located centrally within the city of Tbilisi, something that had not been considered in earlier studies of potential seismic source zones.

== Damage ==
The unusually high frequency of the shaking, combined with the short duration, meant that there was little damage to larger buildings or those built using reinforced concrete. The most affected buildings were, in contrast, low-rise brick or stone built, which were concentrated in the older part of the city. Buildings affected during the mainshock were further damaged by some of the aftershocks. A total of 18,000 households were badly affected, leaving 69,000 people homeless. There was also significant damage to some schools and hospitals.

Between five and seven people died as a result of the earthquake, and a further 52–70 were injured.

== See also ==
- List of earthquakes in 2002
- List of earthquakes in Georgia (country)

== Sources ==
- Gabrichidze, G.; Lomidze, G.; Mukhadze, T.; Odisharia, A.; Timchenko, I. (August 1–6, 2004). April 2002 epicentral earthquake in Tbilisi, Georgia (PDF). 13th World Conference on Earthquake Engineering. Paper No. 1063. Vancouver, B.C., Canada.
- Javakhishvili, Z.; Godoladze, T. G.; Elashvili, M.; Timchenko, I. (2004), "The Tbilisi earthquake of April 25, 2002 in the context of the seismic hazard of the Tbilisi urban area", Bollettino di Geofisica Teorica e Applicata, 43 (3): 169–185
- Triep, E.G.; Abers, G.A.; Lerner-Lahm, A.L.; Mishatkin, V.; Zakharchenko, N. & Starovoit, O. (1995). "Active thrust front of the Greater Caucasus: The April 29, 1991, Racha earthquake sequence and its tectonic implications" (PDF). Journal of Geophysical Research. 100 (B3): 4011–4033. Bibcode:1995JGR...100.4011T. doi:10.1029/94JB02597. Archived from the original (PDF) on 22 June 2011.
