= 1283 Samtskhe earthquake =

Earthquake in Georgia

- Location within Georgia
- Local date: Easter Saturday, 1283
- Local time: 03:00
- Magnitude: 7.0±0.5 M_{s}
- Epicenter: 41.7°N 43.2°E
- Fault: Tabatskuri fault
- Type: Strike-slip
- Areas affected: Georgia
- Max. intensity: MSK-64 IX (Destructive)
- Casualties: A large number

In about 1283, Samtskhe (Meskheti) region in Georgia was struck by a major earthquake. It had an estimated magnitude of 7.0±0.5 on the surface wave magnitude scale M_{s} and an epicentral intensity of IX–X on the Medvedev–Sponheuer–Karnik scale (MSK). It caused widespread damage in the Samtskhe region, destroying or badly damaging many houses, churches, monasteries and fortresses. The death toll for this earthquake is not known in detail, but contemporary reports state that "a large number of people died".

== Tectonic setting ==
Meskheti lies within the Lesser Caucasus, a mountain range that runs along the southern part of Georgia, linking to the Pontic Mountains in Turkey to the west, continuing into Armenia to the east. The Lesser Caucasus are part of the wide and complex zone of shortening caused by the northward movement of the Arabian plate relative to the Eurasian plate. The active structures in the Meskheti area form part of the Achara-Trialeti fold and thrust belt and include mainly southward-dipping thrust faults and two major sinistral (left-lateral) strike-slip faults.

== Earthquake ==
The earthquake appears on different dates in various sources, but 1283 is the year considered most likely. An anonymous chronicler says that the mainshock was on the Easter Saturday, and was preceded by two foreshocks, a stronger one on the Wednesday of Easter Week and a weaker one on the Thursday. From the degree of damage to buildings and the distribution of major landslides, the greatest intensity of shaking was >IX on the Medvedev–Sponheuer–Karnik scale (MSK), estimated for Dgvari and Atskuri. The intensity estimated for the epicentre was Io=IX–X, which has been used to suggest a magnitude of 7.0±0.5 M_{s}, based on other Georgian earthquakes. Movement on the left-lateral strike-slip Tabatskuri fault is thought to have caused the earthquake.

== Damage ==
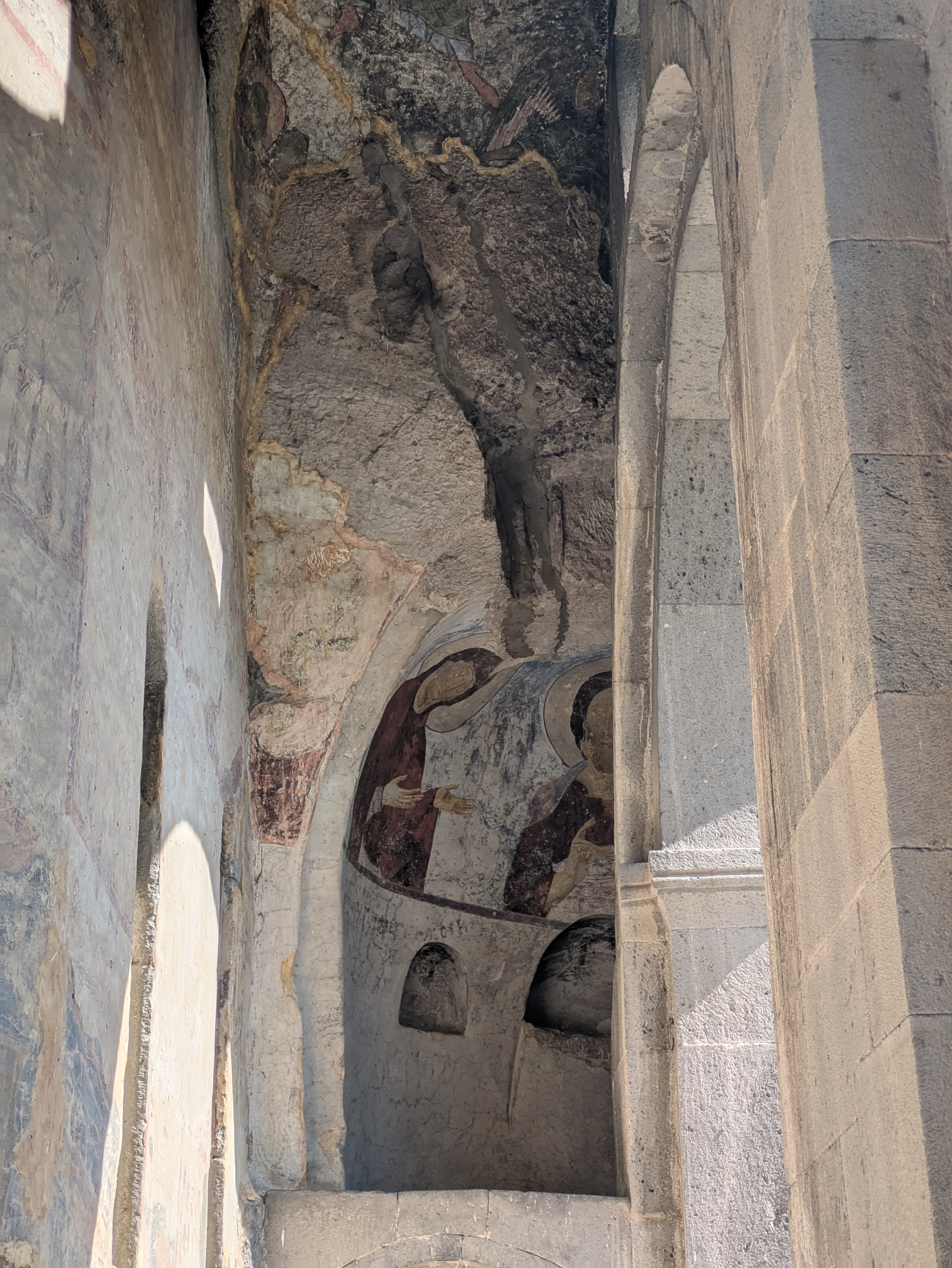
View of the apse of the narthex of the Church of Dormition at Vardzia showing the remaining part of the painting of Christ, the rest fell away in the earthquake

The area of greatest damage was reported to be near Atskuri. The church was badly affected, with the dome collapsing onto the icon of the Virgin. The nearby village of Okona was completely destroyed. Further afield, the dome of the Samtavro Monastery at Mtskheta collapsed during the earthquake. The cave monastery at Vardzia was severely damaged by the earthquake, with the loss of nearly 80% of the caves.

Major landslides at Dgvari, Atskuri and Naokhrebi may have been triggered by the earthquake.

== See also ==
- List of earthquakes in Georgia
