= Gori Fortress =

Fortress in Gori, Georgia

Coordinates: 41°59′10″N 44°06′29″E

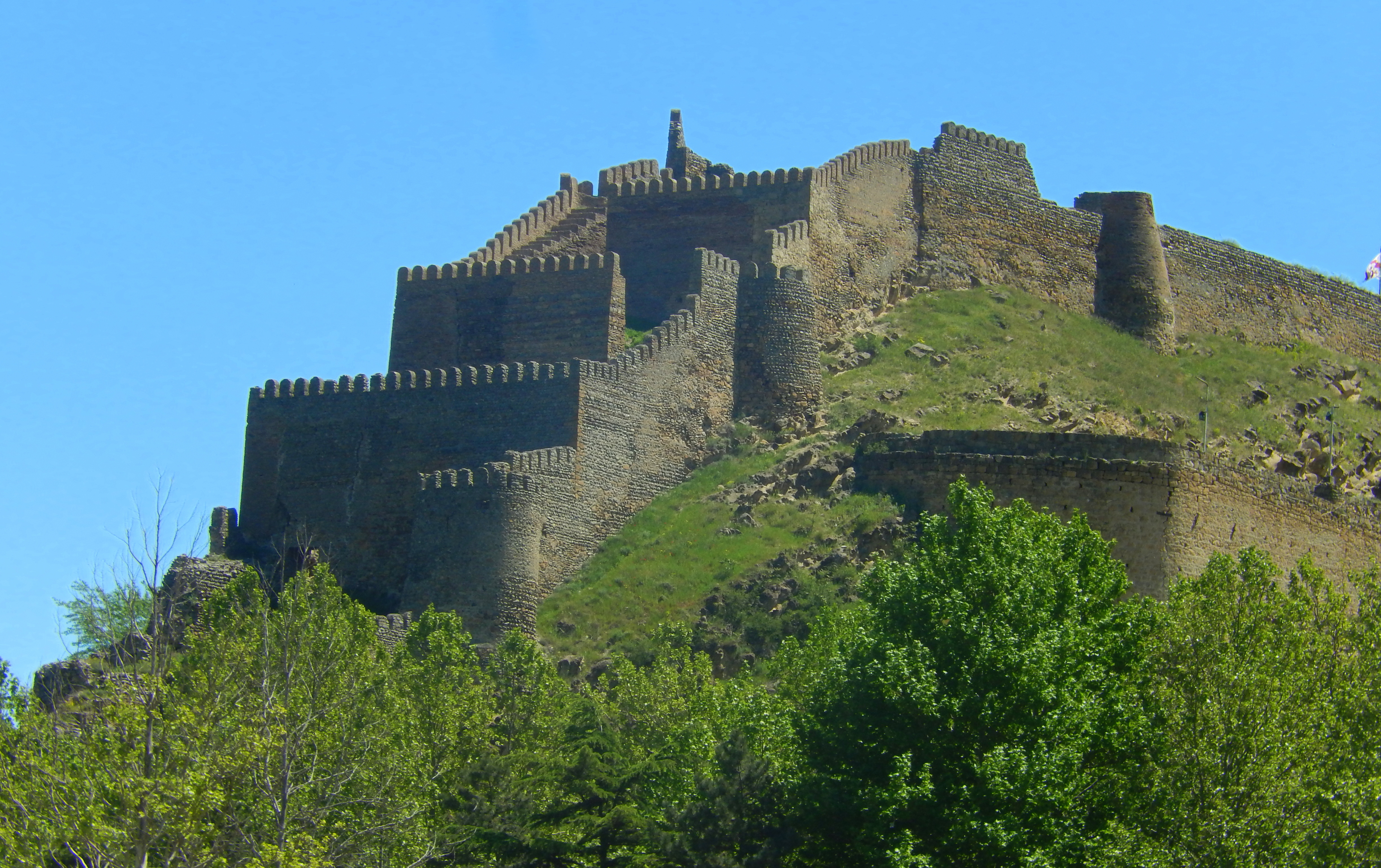
Gori Fortress

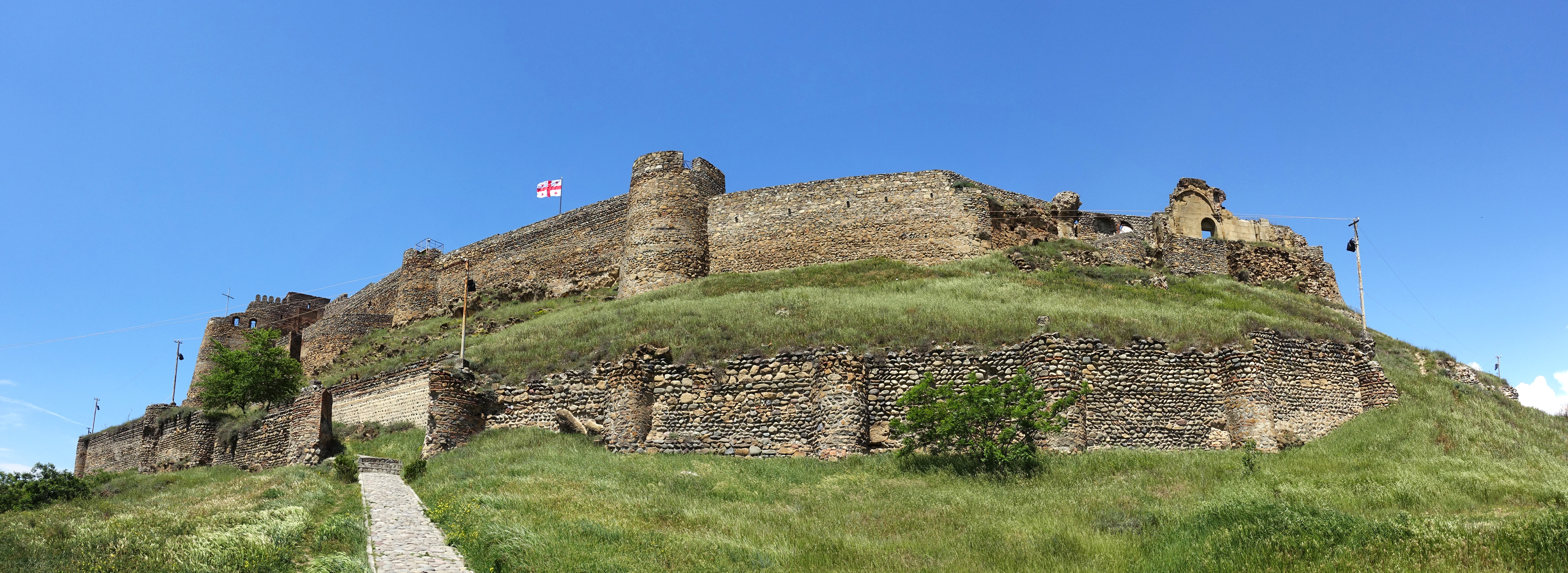
Side view of the Gori Fortress

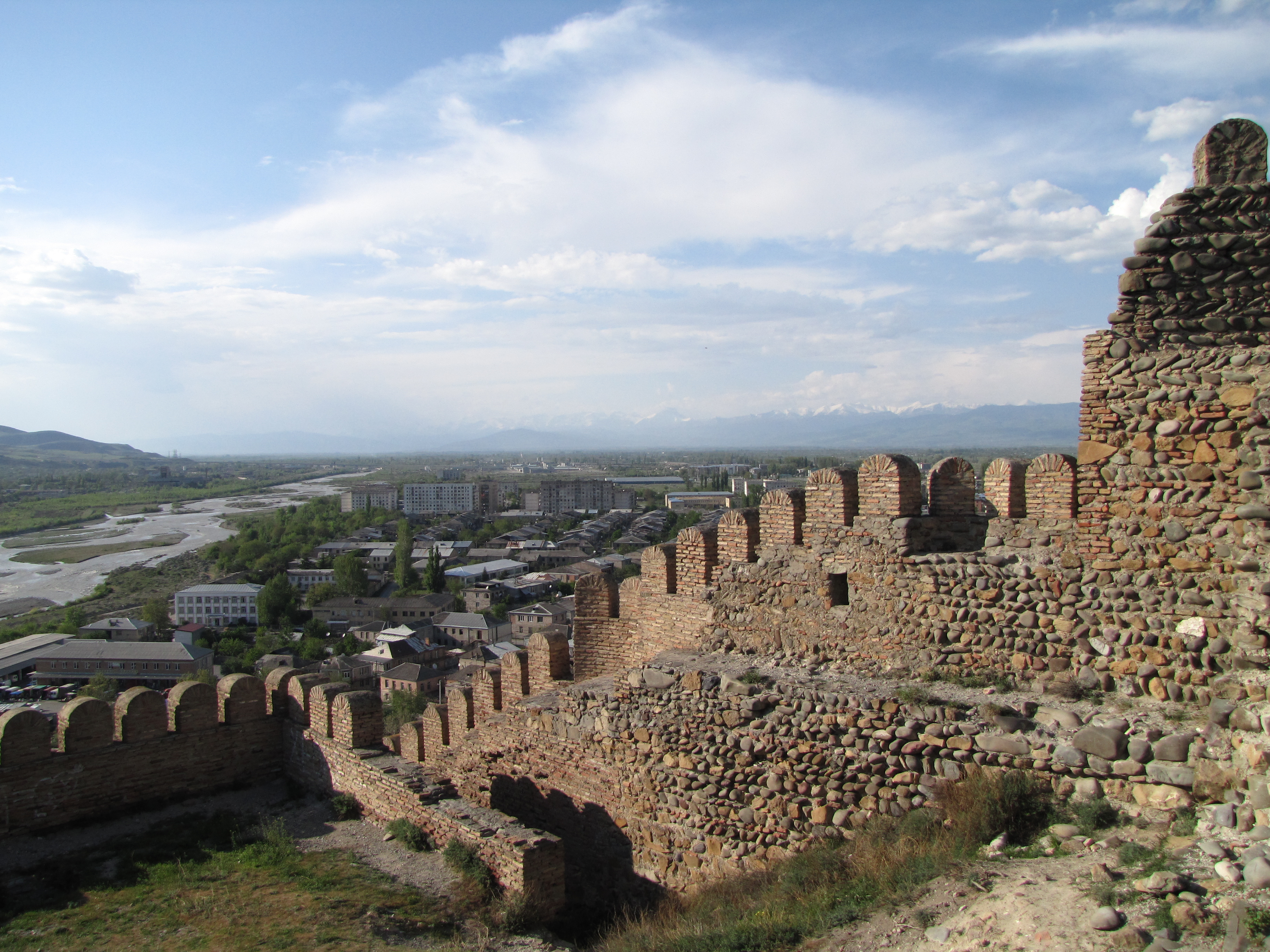
Caucasus mountains from the Gori fortress

Gori Fortress (Georgian: გორის ციხე, "Goris Tsikhe") is a medieval citadel in Georgia, situated above the city of Gori on a rocky hill.

Standing on the hilltop, the fortress's outlines follow the natural relief, hence the irregular shape. The inner fortifications occupy the entire plateau, from which the walls descend towards the road along the western slope. Originally, the walls reached the river below and the water had to be diverted through a tunnel, but the river has retreated since.

The fortress first appears in records from the 13th century, but archaeological evidence shows that the area had already been fortified in the final centuries BC. The fortress was of major strategic importance, given its dominant position guarding a regional trade route, and accommodated a large garrison. In the 16th century the Ottomans captured it to overawe Tbilisi. In 1598 the Georgians, led by their king Simon I, besieged it for nine months to no avail; in 1599 they feigned relieving the siege for Lent and then launched a surprise night attack to regain control over the citadel. The fortress continued to change hands between the Georgians and the Persians in the 17th century.

The citadel acquired its present-day form under the Georgian kings Rostom of Kartli in the 1630s and Erekle II in 1774. Following its completion, Rostom garrisoned it with Iranian soldiers. King Rostom also asked the Italian missionary Cristophoro Castelli, who lived in Gori, to draw the fortress. His stunning illustration from approximately 1642 is a valuable historical document. After the Russian annexation of Georgia in 1801, the fortress was garrisoned by a Russian grenadier battalion, but its importance gradually declined and the fortifications went defunct. The city plan of 1824 shows the citadel, the city on the hill slopes and a moat encircling both. The British Encyclopædia Metropolitana reported in 1845:

At the foot of a chain of low sandstone hills stands the Town and Fortress of Gori, (perhaps the Gursenna of Strabo,) the next place in magnitude and importance to Tiflis. The Castle, an oblong, 200 paces in length, placed sixteen fathoms above the level of the Liakhvi, running at the foot of the hill on which it stands, is now abandoned, a Chapel in its South-Eastern angle being the only part in use.

Gori Fortress was significantly damaged by an earthquake in 1920. The best preserved structure is Tskhra-kara ("the Nine-gated"), facing to the west and adjoined by supplementary walls on the south and east.

== Gallery ==
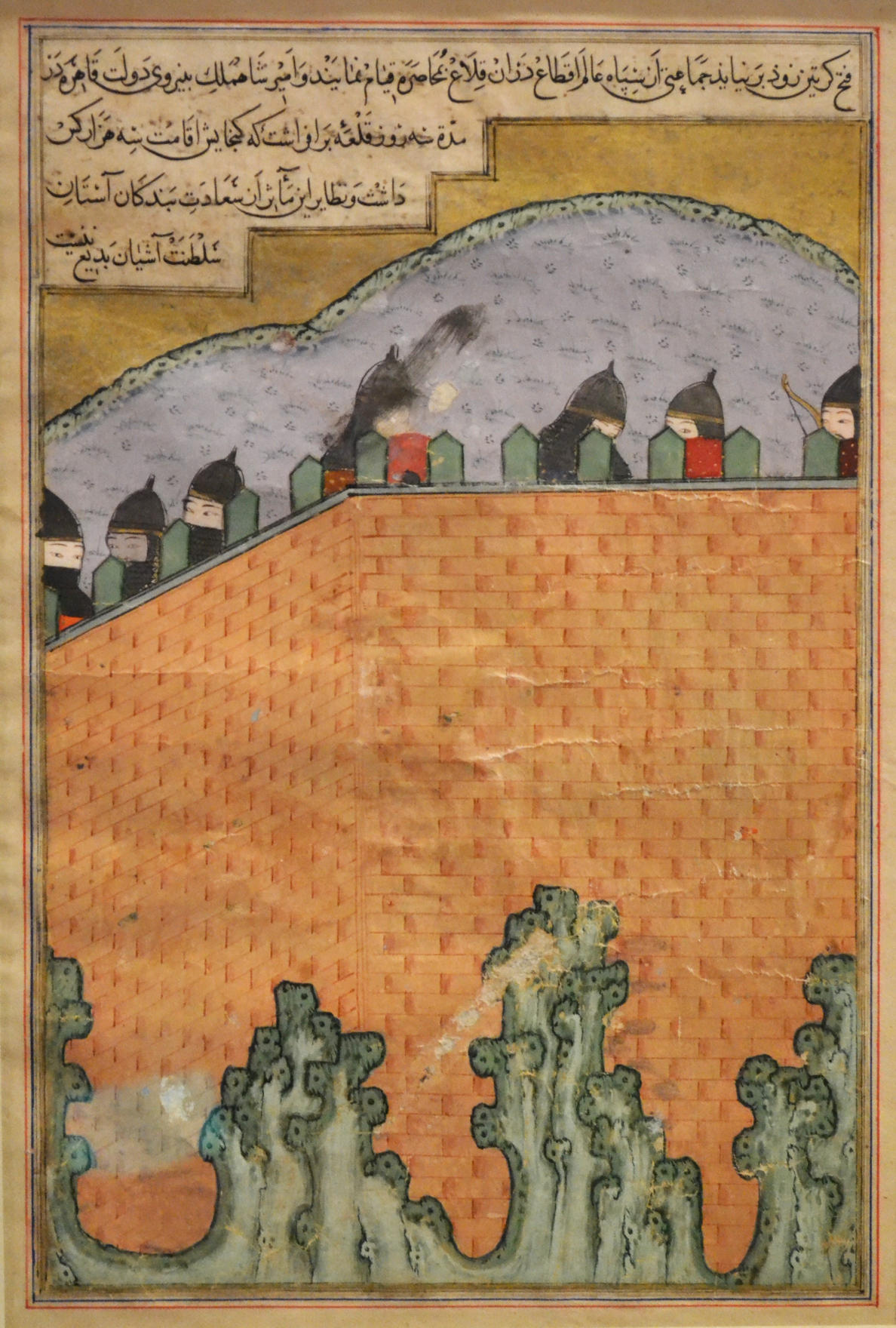
Sharaf al-Din Ali Yazdi, Timur besieges the Georgian Castle of Gorin

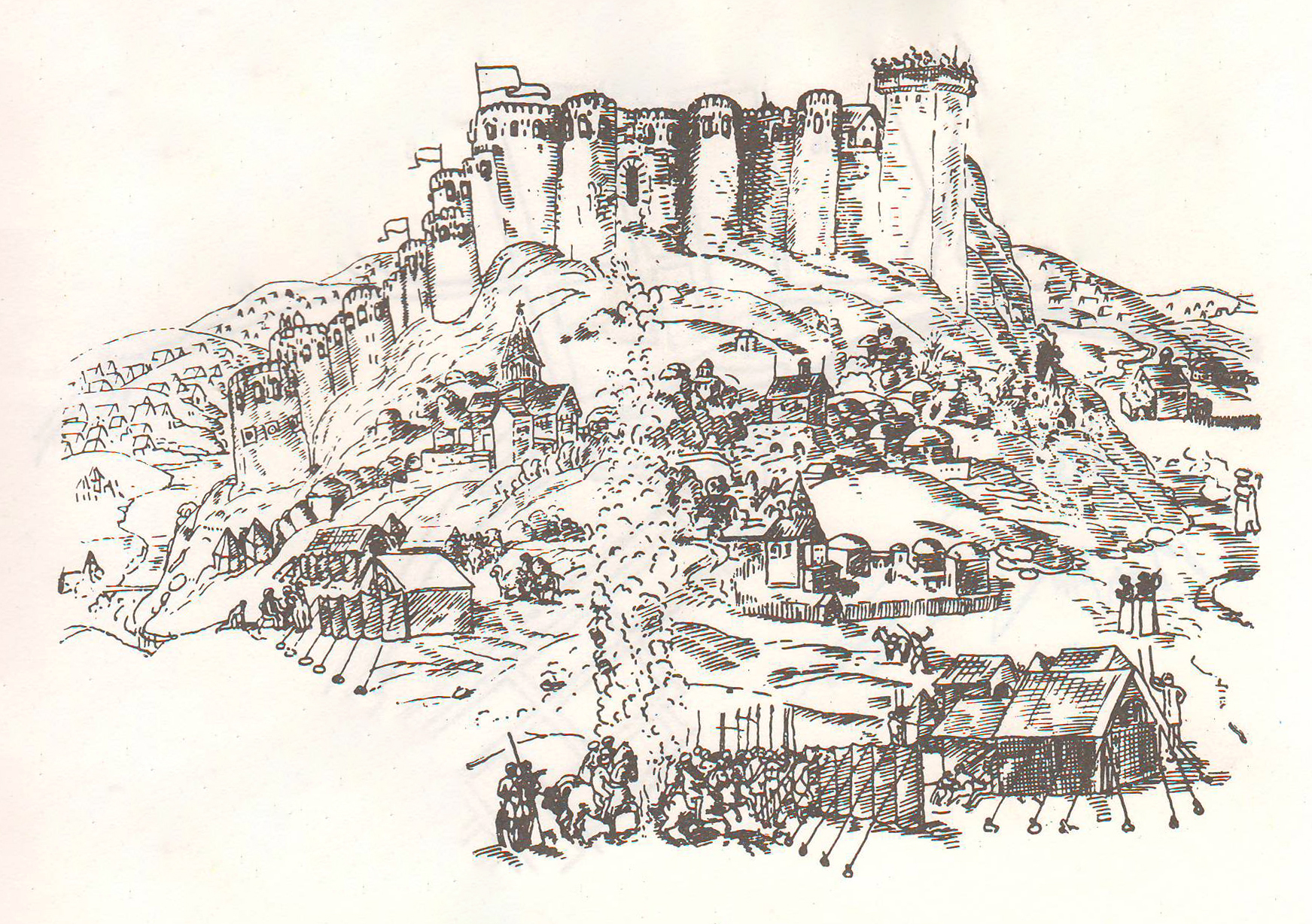
Gori fortress, by Cristoforo Castelli, circa 1642

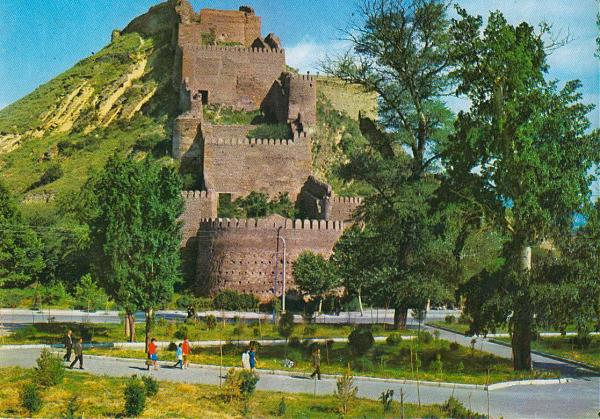
Gori Fortress

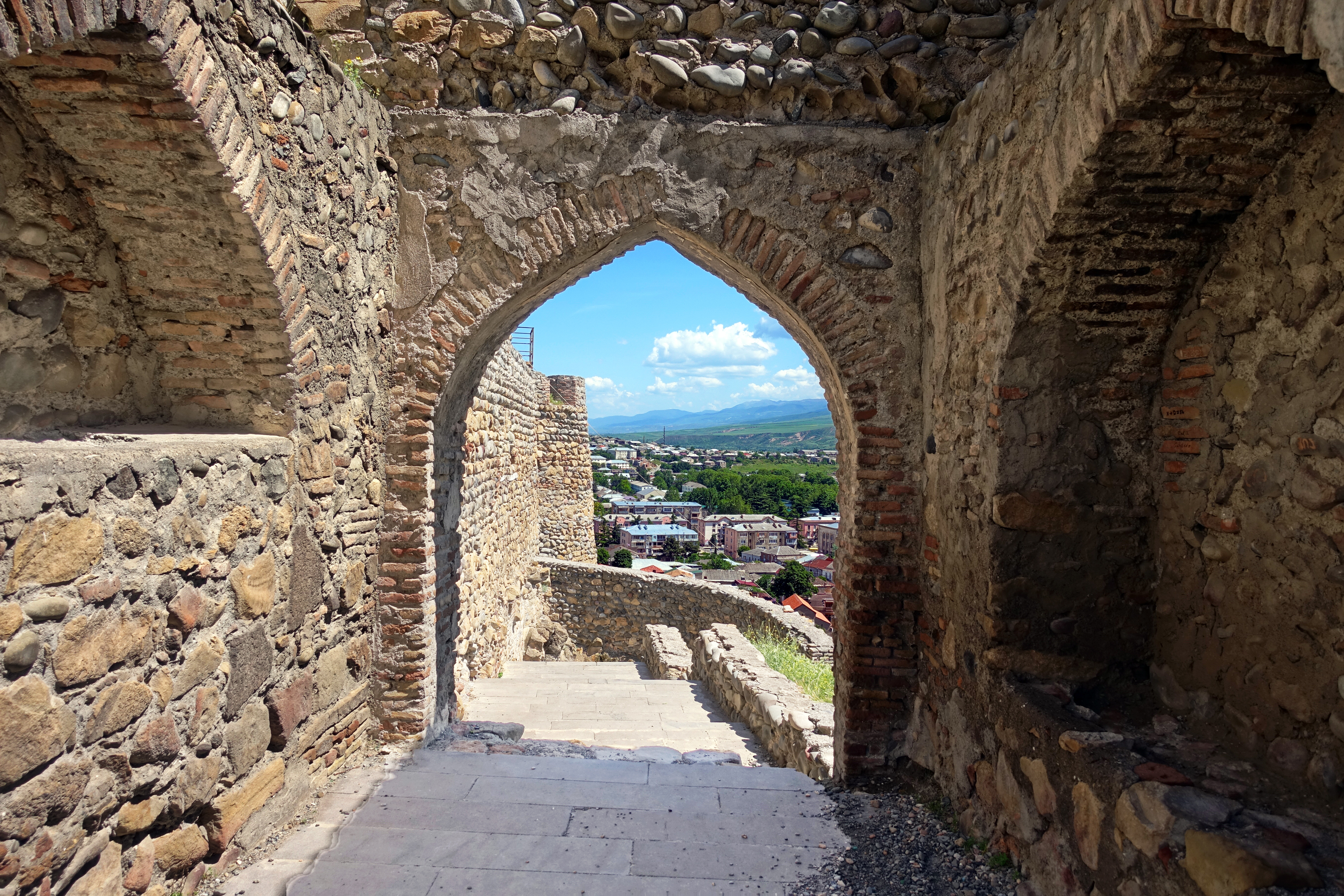
Gates of the fortress

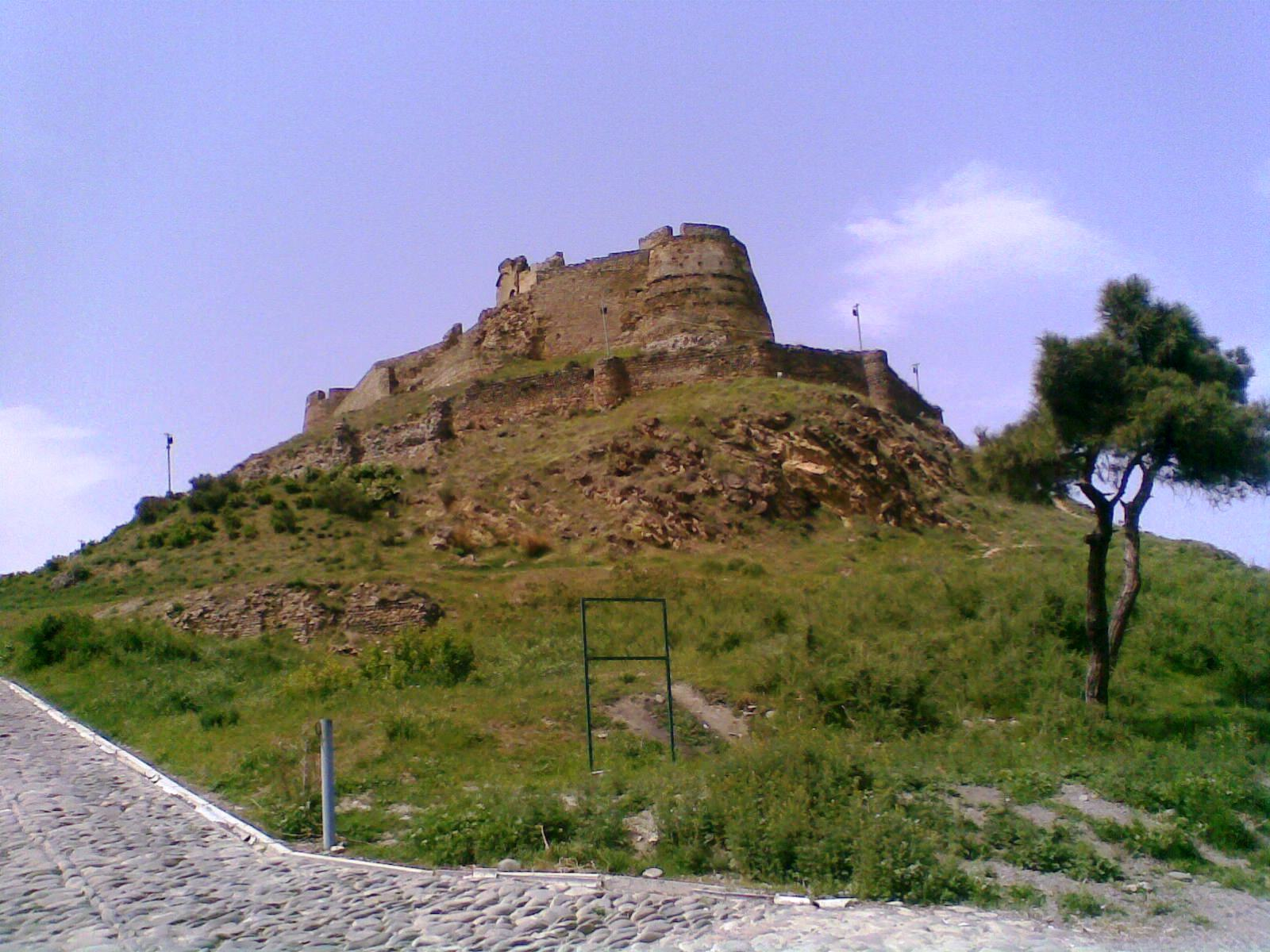
Pathway to the fortress

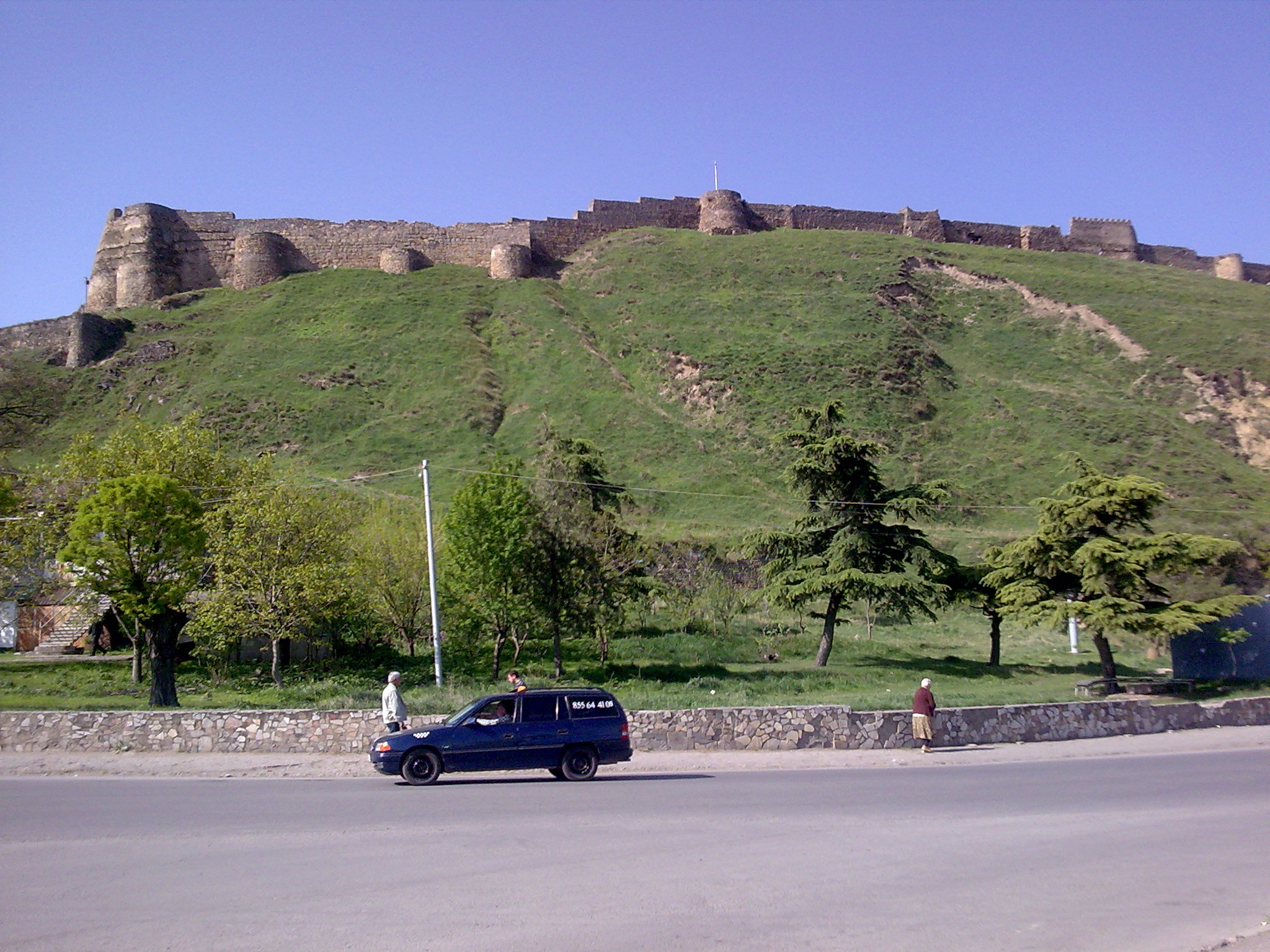
Gori fortress from the north side
