= Sukhishvili University =

- სუხიშვილის სასწავლო უნივერსიტეტი
- Type: Private University
- Established: 1995; 31 years ago
- Founders: Valeri Sukhishvili
- Location: Tskhinvali St 9, 1400, Gori, Shida Kartli, Georgia; 41.9925°N 44.1100°E
- Website: www.sukhishvilebi.edu.ge

Sukhishvili University (სუხიშვილის სასწავლო უნივერსიტეტი) is an accredited, independent private university under Georgia's national accreditation scheme by the National Center for Educational Accreditation (replaced by the National Center for Educational Quality Enhancement in 2010) in Shida Kartli region, Gori, central Georgia. It was founded in 1995 as Georgian Agrarian Science Academy Branch; in 2003 it obtained independent status. The founder and rector of the university is Valeri Sukhishvili.

== History ==
Sukhishvili University was founded by Valeri Sukhishvili in 1995. It started higher education studies with two faculties and subsequently established 7 more faculties. The Faculty of Medicine was established in 2008. The university has 9 specializations including law, pharmacy, business administration, and engineering. More than 500 students get bachelor, master and doctoral degrees in sciences.

In Sukhishvili University there are 12 full professors, 15 associated professors and 27 assistant professors. There are 2,500 students including 750 international students from 12 countries, following full-time or part-time degree and diploma courses, many of them run on the modular or credit system. A basic Foundation Studies Course enables international high school students who have completed their secondary or high school education overseas but who do not have the necessary entry requirements, to qualify for admission to an undergraduate degree course

== Academic branches ==
Sukhishvili University has nine faculties:

- Faculty of Education
- Faculty of Engineering
- Faculty of Economics and Administrative Sciences
- Faculty of Arts and Sciences
- Faculty of Law
- Faculty of Theology
- Faculty of Fine Arts Design and Architecture
- School of Medicine
- Conservatory

== Notable faculty and alumni ==
- Oto Nemsadze (born 1989), singer
- Geno Petriashvili (born 1994), wrestler
- Lasha Shavdatuashvili (born 1992), wrestler
