= 1920 Garfagnana earthquake =

Earthquake in Italy

- Location within Alps
- UTC time: 1920-09-07 05:55:40
- ISC event: 912596
- USGS-ANSS: ComCat
- Local date: 7 September 1920
- Local time: 07:55
- Magnitude: 6.5 M_{L}
- Epicenter: 44.183°N 10.283°E
- Areas affected: Italy, Tuscany
- Max. intensity: MMI X (Extreme)
- Casualties: 171

The 1920 Garfagnana earthquake (also known as the Lunigiana earthquake) occurred on 7 September in Garfagnana and Lunigiana, both agricultural areas in the Italian Tuscany region. The quake hypocenter was located 14 kilometres (8.7 mi) beneath Villa Collemandina. The maximum felt intensity was rated as X (Extreme) on the Mercalli intensity scale, and 6.6 on the Richter scale. It was one of the most destructive seismic events recorded in the Apenninic region in the twentieth century. Due to good news coverage, availability of official documents on the damage and abundance of recordings from surveillance stations throughout Europe, it was regarded as a first-rate case study to improve knowledge of tectonics and macroseismic analysis.

== Geology ==
The epicenter of the 1920 earthquake lay within the inner zone of the Northern Apennines, which has been affected by extensional tectonics since the Late Miocene to Pliocene epochs. This extension is a result of the same process that opened the Tyrrhenian Sea during the same period, the rollback of the subducting Adriatic plate. The continuing extension has resulted in a series of northwest–southeast trending normal faults bounding basins filled by the Pliocene to recent sediments. Near Garfagnana, there are two such basins, the Serchio and Magra grabens. The 1920 event is thought to have ruptured the east-dipping Casciana-Sillicano fault on the southwestern boundary of the Serchio graben. Lunigiana and Garfagnana are part of the Apennines, a mountain area located above a subduction zone between the Adriatic and Tyrrhenian tectonic plates. The region, crossed by different systems of active faults, is mainly mountainous and rocky, with noticeable variations in soil composition.

== Earthquake ==
Foreshocks occurred on 6 September, including an intensity VI (Strong) event on 6 September at 2:05 p.m. Frightened by these foreshocks, many people choose to sleep outside their homes in the open air, since the weather was still mild in the late summer. The main shock came at 7:55 a.m. (local time) the following morning, after a few hours of calm, its epicenter directly under the town of Villa Collemandina.

The towns of Vigneta and Villa Collemandina were completely destroyed. Fivizzano, with its tall buildings in the city center, was almost totally demolished, those buildings that remained standing were later destroyed by the aftershocks. Piazza al Serchio and another 30 towns suffered substantial damage to buildings and infrastructure. Reports of collapsed buildings came from about 100 towns and over 350 comuni from eastern Liguria to western Versilia were affected. The earthquake was noticed by people in the French Riviera, Friuli, Marche and Umbria, over 400 kilometres (250 mi) from the stricken area. Aftershocks lasted up until August 1921.

=== Damage ===
The earthquake wrought massive destruction. Near the epicenter, an area of about 160 square kilometres (62 sq mi) from Fivizzano in Lunigiana and the upper Garfagnana, received X (Extreme) damage, including the collapse of many buildings. Newspaper headlines read "Fivizzano is no more". A much bigger area, assessed at over 1,060 square kilometres (410 sq mi), received significant damage, and minor damage was sustained by other regions in Toscana, Emilia-Romagna and Liguria. Many provinces reported consequences from the shocks: nearby Lucca and Massa Carrara, Modena, Parma, Pisa, Pistoia, Reggio Emilia and La Spezia.

In Pontremoli the shock destroyed the rooftop of the Chiesa della Misericordia church: debris fell on the ancient organ, damaging it.

Roads near the epicenter were compromised, along with some bridges. Since rescue operations were mostly managed on a local scale (city or town, lacking any national coordinating authority), that was a minor detriment to relief work. More of a problem was the availability of first aid resources, which were scarce. There was also much less food and tents than what was needed.

In the broader damaged area, some springs changed their path or became cloudy due to a sharp increase in the content of Hydrogen sulfide.

On 21 September refugees were affected by an exceptionally violent downpour, further worsening their condition. The refugees asked Bishop Angelo Fiorini to intercede with the Pope, hopeful to receive some economic help or relief effort, but received only a blessing to the victims. On the other hand, many organizations of emigrants in the United States and Argentina managed to collect and send significant donations of money.

Anomalies in distribution

Isoseismic curves of the event displayed some anomalies in damage distribution. The town of Fosdinovo and its surroundings sustained only minor damage, despite being in the middle of an area of widespread destruction. Vigneta and Castiglioncello, both frazioni of Casola in Lunigiana, had very different fates: the first was completely devastated, while the latter experienced only a few cracks in the walls and some collapsed chimneys. Study on those anomalies led to a better understanding of the effect of ground composition on the transmission of seismic waves. Vigneta was built on alluvial ground, made of sand and cobbles. It turned out that the cobbles acted as an amplifier for the shock waves, multiplying their intensity and deflecting them in random directions. Sometimes, cobbles shattered, and the ground above was further destabilized. Castiglioncello was built on an extraordinarily compact limestone slab, which acted as a barrier that reflected shock waves. Resonance and shock-wave amplification phenomena, well understood today, were unknown at the time of the Garfagnana earthquake.

=== Casualties ===
One hundred and seventy one people died in the disaster, mostly from building collapses or being hit by falling debris. A further 650 were injured. Families left homeless numbered in the thousands. Thirty of the casualties and half the injured were concentrated in Fivizzano.

Casualties could have been much higher without the precursor shocks scaring much of the populace into sleeping outdoors. Garfagnana and Lunigiana were mostly farming areas, so at the time of the disaster, most men were out in mountain pastures or going to their fields, leaving their wives and children at home.

== Aftermath ==
The rebuilding took over ten years. Property speculation was reported in Fivizzano, where well-off local people bought up plots from those without the means of rebuilding their homes. Reconstruction, lacking a town plan, was messy and disorganized. In Fivizzano, the ancient San Giovanni church – built by ancestors of Pope Nicholas V – sustained only partial damage to the roof, but was nevertheless demolished, along with a Medici palace and the Teatro degli Imperfetti theater, in the rush to take advantage of the disaster; new housing and commercial buildings were erected on the valuable lots formerly occupied by the monuments.

== Previous events ==
As is common in central Italy, many towns are built on steep hillside or along deep valleys. The region is rated as second and third class on a four-class scale of seismicity, according to the Italian building code (four being the highest).

Despite being inhabited since ancient times, the region experienced rapid colonization in the Middle Ages, thanks to agricultural techniques allowing the exploitation of the steep hills and to the new wealth acquired by the nearby Republic of Florence.

According to records made by Bartolomeo Pucci, captain of Florence's army, the town of Fivizzano was struck by a major earthquake in 1481, with an intensity estimated at VIII (Severe) on the Mercalli scale. The town experienced extensive damage, but few or no other records were preserved in the small town. Until the nineteenth century, it was a common occurrence for city leaders to downplay the disasters striking their lands to avoid giving nearby rival cities any incentive to declare war.

On 9 June 1545 Borgo Val di Taro was destroyed by another earthquake. From 8 to 10 June 1641, two medium-sized shocks hit nearby Pontremoli, causing damage to many buildings, as recorded in the Memorie Pontremolesi chronicles. On 23 July 1746 an earthquake hit the town of Barga. On 21 January 1767 Fivizzano was struck again, as was Pontremoli on 14 February 1834.

Fivizzano was struck again on 15 October 1939, but while the energy release of the quake was larger, the hypocenter was much deeper (between 20 and 26 kilometres, or 12 to 16 mi, down) and damage was significant, but limited. On 25 October 1957, Pontremoli and Borgotaro were struck again by a very powerful quake. As its hypocenter was over 45 kilometres (28 mi) deep, the shock was felt across the whole of northern Italy, but caused little damage.

Between 1740 and 2000, the Garfagnana region experienced 16 earthquakes rated as "strong" or above (VI or greater on the Mercalli scale).

== See also ==
- List of earthquakes in 1920
- List of earthquakes in Italy
