= List of earthquakes in 1920 =

Earthquakes in 1920
Approximate epicenters of the earthquakes in 1920
- 4.0–5.9 magnitude
- 6.0–6.9 magnitude
- 7.0–7.9 magnitude
- 8.0+ magnitude
- Strongest: China Ningxia Province 16 December (Magnitude 8.3)
- Deadliest: China Ningxia Province 16 December (Magnitude 8.3) 242,029 deaths
- Total fatalities: 244,887

Number by magnitude
- 9.0+: 0
- 8.0–8.9: 3
- 7.0–7.9: 7
- 6.0–6.9: 29
- 5.0–5.9: 2

This is a list of earthquakes in 1920. Only magnitude 6.0 or greater earthquakes appear on the list. Lower magnitude events are included if they have caused death, injury or damage. Events which occurred in remote areas will be excluded from the list as they wouldn't have generated significant media interest. All dates are listed according to UTC time. With over 200,000 deaths being recorded in China, and substantial fatalities elsewhere, 1920 was one of the deadliest years of the 20th century for earthquakes.

== Overall ==
=== By death toll ===
Rank	Death toll	Magnitude	Location	MMI	Depth (km)	Date
1	242,029	8.3	(Republic of China (1912–1949)) Republic of China, Ningxia Province	XII (Extreme)	15.0	16 December
3	648	6.3	Mexico, Veracruz	X (Extreme)	0.0	3 January
4	400	6.0	Argentina, Mendoza Province	VIII (Severe)	10.0	17 December
5	200	6.2	Principality of Albania, Gjirokaster County	XI (Extreme)	25.0	26 November
6	171	5.8	Italy, Emilia-Romagna	X (Extreme)	10.0	7 September
= 7	101	6.2	Democratic Republic of Georgia, Shida Kartli	( )	11.0	20 February
= 7	101	5.6	Principality of Albania, Vlore County	IX (Violent)	0.0	18 December

- Note: At least 10 casualties

=== By magnitude ===
Rank	Magnitude	Death toll	Location	MMI	Depth (km)	Date
1	8.3	242,029	China, Ningxia Province	XII (Extreme)	15.0	16 December
2	8.2	8	Taiwan, east of	VII (Very strong)	20.0	5 June
3	8.1	0	France, Loyalty Islands	( )	25.0	20 September
= 4	7.8	0	New Guinea, East New Britain Province	( )	35.0	2 February
5	7.3	0	Argentina, Neuquen Province	( )	15.0	10 December
= 6	7.1	0	Russian SFSR, Sea of Okhotsk	( )	355.1	22 February
= 6	7.1	0	Russian SFSR, southern end of Urup, Kuril Islands	( )	35.0	18 October
= 7	7.0	0	southern East Pacific Rise	( )	10.0	20 March
= 7	7.0	0	New Guinea, off the north coast of	( )	25.0	13 May

- Note: At least 7.0 magnitude

== Notable events ==
=== January ===
January
- Strongest: 7.8 M_{w} Mexico
- Deadliest: 7.8 M_{w} Mexico; 648 deaths
- Total fatalities: 648

Number by magnitude
- 8.0–8.9: 0
- 7.0–7.9: 1
- 6.0–6.9: 1

Date	Country and location	M_{w}	Depth (km)	MMI	Notes	Casualties	
Date	Country and location	M_{w}	Depth (km)	MMI	Notes	Dead	Injured
3	Mexico, Veracruz	6.3	15.0	X	The 1920 Xalapa earthquake left 648 people were killed and another 167 were injured. Damage was caused.	648	167
30	Colombia, Cauca Department	6.0	35.0				

=== February ===
February
- Strongest: 7.8 M_{w} New Guinea
- Deadliest: 6.2 M_{w} Georgia; 101+ deaths
- Total fatalities: 101+

Number by magnitude
- 8.0–8.9: 0
- 7.0–7.9: 2
- 6.0–6.9: 3

Date	Country and location	M_{w}	Depth (km)	MMI	Notes	Casualties	
Date	Country and location	M_{w}	Depth (km)	MMI	Notes	Dead	Injured
2	New Guinea, East New Britain Province	7.8	35.0		A few homes were destroyed.		
7	Japan, off the east coast of Honshu	6.7	35.0				
10	United States, northwest of Puerto Rico	6.4	15.0				
20	DR Georgia, Shida Kartli	6.2	11.0		At least 101 people were killed and many homes were damaged due to the 1920 Gori earthquake.	101+	
22	Russian SFSR, Sea of Okhotsk	7.1	355.1				

=== March ===
March
- Strongest: 7.0 M_{w} southern East Pacific Rise
- Total fatalities: 0

Number by magnitude
- 8.0–8.9: 0
- 7.0–7.9: 1
- 6.0–6.9: 2

Date	Country and location	M_{w}	Depth (km)	MMI	Notes	Casualties	
Date	Country and location	M_{w}	Depth (km)	MMI	Notes	Dead	Injured
17	Dutch East Indies, off the west coast of northern Sumatra	6.3	15.0				
20	southern East Pacific Rise	7.0	10.0				
29	Canada, western British Columbia	6.4	15.0				

=== April ===
April
- Strongest: 6.6 M_{w} Mexico
- Total fatalities: 0

Number by magnitude
- 8.0–8.9: 0
- 7.0–7.9: 0
- 6.0–6.9: 3

Date	Country and location	M_{w}	Depth (km)	MMI	Notes	Casualties	
Date	Country and location	M_{w}	Depth (km)	MMI	Notes	Dead	Injured
2	New Guinea, Oro Province	6.3	15.0				
11	Russian SFSR, Kuril Islands	6.3	15.0				
19	Mexico, Oaxaca	6.6	35.0				

=== May ===
May
- Strongest: 7.0 M_{w} New Guinea
- Total fatalities: 0

Number by magnitude
- 8.0–8.9: 0
- 7.0–7.9: 1
- 6.0–6.9: 7

Date	Country and location	M_{w}	Depth (km)	MMI	Notes	Casualties	
Date	Country and location	M_{w}	Depth (km)	MMI	Notes	Dead	Injured
6	Russian SFSR, Primorsky Krai	6.5	500.0				
7	Philippines, east of Mindanao	6.8	35.0				
7	British Solomon Islands, south of	6.8	15.0				
10	Dutch East Indies, Banda Sea	6.5	370.0				
12	Japan, off the south coast of Honshu	6.6	150.0				
13	New Guinea, off the north coast of	7.0	25.0				
20	British Solomon Islands, Santa Cruz Islands	6.8	80.0				
27	Dutch East Indies, Java Sea	6.5	600.0				

=== June ===
June
- Strongest: 8.2 M_{w} Taiwan
- Deadliest: 8.2 M_{w} Taiwan; 8 deaths
- Total fatalities: 8

Number by magnitude
- 8.0–8.9: 1
- 7.0–7.9: 0
- 6.0–6.9: 1

Date	Country and location	M_{w}	Depth (km)	MMI	Notes	Casualties	
Date	Country and location	M_{w}	Depth (km)	MMI	Notes	Dead	Injured
5	Taiwan, east of	8.2	20.0	VII	8 people were killed and 24 were injured. 273 homes were destroyed in the 1920 Hualien earthquake.	5	24
9	Dutch East Indies, Banda Sea	6.8	15.0				

=== July ===
July
- Strongest: 6.0 M_{w} Canada
- Total fatalities: 0

Number by magnitude
- 8.0–8.9: 0
- 7.0–7.9: 0
- 6.0–6.9: 1

Date	Country and location	M_{w}	Depth (km)	MMI	Notes	Casualties	
Date	Country and location	M_{w}	Depth (km)	MMI	Notes	Dead	Injured
7	Canada, southern Yukon Territory	6.0	35.0				

=== August ===
August
- Strongest: 6.9 M_{w} 2 events
- Total fatalities: 0

Number by magnitude
- 8.0–8.9: 0
- 7.0–7.9: 0
- 6.0–6.9: 4

Date	Country and location	M_{w}	Depth (km)	MMI	Notes	Casualties	
Date	Country and location	M_{w}	Depth (km)	MMI	Notes	Dead	Injured
3	Argentina, Catamarca Province	6.9	15.0				
13	Bolivia, Potosi Department	6.5	150.0				
15	British Solomon Islands, Santa Cruz Islands	6.7	35.0				
20	Chile, Araucania Region	6.9	15.0		Some homes were damaged or destroyed.		

=== September ===
September
- Strongest: 8.1 M_{w} France
- Deadliest: 5.8 M_{w} Italy; 1,400 deaths
- Total fatalities: 1,400

Number by magnitude
- 8.0–8.9: 1
- 7.0–7.9: 0
- 6.0–6.9: 1
- 5.0–5.9: 1

Date	Country and location	M_{w}	Depth (km)	MMI	Notes	Casualties	
Date	Country and location	M_{w}	Depth (km)	MMI	Notes	Dead	Injured
7	Italy, Emilia-Romagna	5.8	10.0	X	There was conflicting information about the 1920 Garfagnana earthquake. Some sources put the death toll as high as 1,400 whereas others report 171 deaths.	1,400	
16	Japan, southeast of Hokkaido	6.5	35.0				
20	France, Loyalty Islands	8.1	25.0		A tsunami caused some minor damage.		

=== October ===
October
- Strongest: 7.1 M_{w} Russia
- Total fatalities: 0

Number by magnitude
- 8.0–8.9: 0
- 7.0–7.9: 1
- 6.0–6.9: 2

Date	Country and location	M_{w}	Depth (km)	MMI	Notes	Casualties	
Date	Country and location	M_{w}	Depth (km)	MMI	Notes	Dead	Injured
12	China, border of Xizang Province and Xinjiang Province	6.7	20.0				
18	Russian SFSR, southern end of Urup, Kuril Islands	7.1	35.0				
20	Taiwan, east of	6.4	15.0				

=== November ===
November
- Strongest: 6.2 M_{w} Albanian Kingdom
- Deadliest: 6.2 M_{w} Albanian Kingdom; 200 deaths
- Total fatalities: 200

Number by magnitude
- 8.0–8.9: 0
- 7.0–7.9: 0
- 6.0–6.9: 1

Date	Country and location	M_{w}	Depth (km)	MMI	Notes	Casualties	
Date	Country and location	M_{w}	Depth (km)	MMI	Notes	Dead	Injured
26	Albania, Gjirokaster County	6.2	25.0	XI	200 people were killed. Many homes were destroyed.	200	

=== December ===
December
- Strongest: 8.3 M_{w} China
- Deadliest: 8.3 M_{w} China; 242,029 deaths
- Total fatalities: 242,530

Number by magnitude
- 8.0–8.9: 1
- 7.0–7.9: 1
- 6.0–6.9: 3
- 5.0–5.9: 1

Date	Country and location	M_{w}	Depth (km)	MMI	Notes	Casualties	
Date	Country and location	M_{w}	Depth (km)	MMI	Notes	Dead	Injured
10	Argentina, Neuquen Province	7.3	15.0				
16	China, Ningxia	8.3	15.0	XII	The 1920 Haiyuan earthquake was one of the deadliest events of the 20th century. Over 200,000 deaths were caused in the region. Based on a list of cities affected there was at least 242,029 people killed. Property damage was around $25 million (1920 rate). Parts of the regional terrain were affected with uplift or slumping.	242,029	
17	Argentina, Mendoza Province	6.0	10.0	VIII	400 people were killed and many homes were destroyed in the 1920 Mendoza earthquake.	400	
18	Albania, Vlore County	5.6	0.0	IX	At least 101 people were killed. Many homes were destroyed.	101+	
19	Japan, off the east coast of Honshu	6.8	35.0				
25	China, Ningxia	6.8	15.0		Aftershock.		
