= 1920 Hualien earthquake =

Earthquake affecting Taiwan

- Location within Taiwan
- UTC time: 1920-06-05 04:21:35
- ISC event: 912519
- USGS-ANSS: ComCat
- Local date: 5 June 1920
- Local time: 12:21:35 TT
- Magnitude: 8.2 M_{w} 8.0 M_{s}
- Depth: 20 km (12 mi)
- Epicenter: 23.688°N 121.954°E
- Areas affected: Hualien County, Taiwan
- Max. intensity: MMI VII (Very strong)
- Casualties: 8 dead, 24 injured

On June 5, 1920, a shallow magnitude 8.2 earthquake struck offshore Hualien County, Empire of Japan (now Taiwan). It is currently the largest earthquake in Taiwan's modern history.

== Tectonic summary ==
Taiwan is located within a complex zone of convergence between the Philippine and Eurasian plates. Off the island's east coast, these plates converge at a rate of 75 mm per year. To the south of Taiwan, oceanic crust of the Eurasian plate is subducting beneath the Philippine Plate, creating an island arc, the Luzon Arc. At Taiwan the oceanic crust has all been subducted and the arc is colliding with continental crust of the Eurasian plate. To the north of Taiwan the Philippine Sea plate is in contrast subducting beneath the Eurasian plate, forming the Ryukyu Arc.

== Earthquake ==
The earthquake had a moment-magnitude of 8.2 according to the International Seismological Centre. Lower-end estimates of the moment magnitude yielded a value of M_{w} 7.7 ± 0.2, which would still make it the largest in Taiwan. The USGS ShakeMap shows all areas of Taiwan felt shaking of between V and VII on the Modified Mercalli intensity scale. The shaking was also felt in southeast China, the island of Luzon in the Philippines, and southwest Japan.

The source fault responsible for the earthquake has not been conclusively identified, although the epicenter location suggest it was associated with the southern portion of the Ryukyu subduction zone. Based on analyzing stations in Taiwan that recorded the earthquake, the hypocenter was determined to be within the accretionary wedge at 20–35 km (12–22 mi) focal depth. The likely source is a rupture propagating down-dip and laterally along a splay fault associated with the subduction zone.

== Impact ==
Eight deaths and 24 injuries were reported. 1,530 houses were affected in the cities of Taipei, Taitung, Hsinchu and Taoyuan, of which 273 were destroyed, and 277 others were severely damaged.

== See also ==
- List of earthquakes in Taiwan
- List of earthquakes in 1920
- 2018 Hualien earthquake
- 2019 Hualien earthquake
