= 1920 Gori earthquake =

Earthquake in Gori, Georgia

- Location within Georgia
- UTC time: 1920-02-20 11:44:40
- ISC event: 912437
- USGS-ANSS: ComCat
- Local date: February 20, 1920
- Local time: 15:44:40
- Magnitude: 6.2 M_{s}
- Depth: 11 km (6.8 mi)
- Epicenter: 42.0°N 44.1°E
- Areas affected: Georgia
- Max. intensity: MMI IX (Violent)
- Casualties: 114–130

The 1920 Gori earthquake hit the Democratic Republic of Georgia on 20 February at 15:44 local time. The shock had a surface-wave magnitude of 6.2 and a maximum Mercalli Intensity of IX (Violent). Heavy damage (and between 114 and 130 deaths) affected the town of Gori and its medieval fortress.

== See also ==
- List of earthquakes in 1920
- List of earthquakes in Georgia (country)
