= 1920 Haiyuan earthquake =

1920 earthquake in central China

- Location within China
- UTC time: 1920-12-16 12:05:55
- ISC event: 912687
- USGS-ANSS: ComCat
- Local date: 16 December 1920 (Gansu-Sichuan Time)
- Local time: 19:05
- Magnitude: M_{w} 7.9
- Epicenter: 36.50°N 105.70°E
- Fault: Haiyuan Fault
- Areas affected: Haiyuan, Ningxia Hui Autonomous Region, Republic of China
- Max. intensity: MMI XII (Extreme)
- Landslides: >50,000
- Casualties: 258,707–273,407 dead

The 1920 Haiyuan earthquake (Chinese: 海原大地震; pinyin: Hǎiyuán dà dìzhèn) occurred in Haiyuan County, Ningxia Province, Republic of China at 19:05:53 (UTC+8) on 16 December 1920. It was also called the 1920 Gansu earthquake because Ningxia was a part of Gansu Province when the earthquake occurred. It caused destruction in the Lijunbu-Haiyuan-Ganyanchi area and was assigned the maximum intensity on the Mercalli intensity scale (XII Extreme). Estimates of the death toll range from 258,707 to 273,407, making it one of the deadliest earthquakes in China and disasters in China by death toll.

== Tectonic setting ==
Major left-lateral strike-slip structures occur in the Tibetan Plateau as a result of the India–Asia collision. These faults, including the Altyn Tagh, Haiyuan, Kunlun, Karakoram and Xianshuihe faults, accommodate crustal deformation within the Tibetan Plateau. One of these fault systems, the Haiyuan Fault, runs 1,000 km (620 mi) along the plateau's northeastern edge.

== Earthquake ==
The earthquake hit at 19:05:53 Gansu-Sichuan time (12:05:53 UTC), reportedly M_{w} 8.25 or M_{L} 7.8, and was followed by a series of aftershocks for three years. The often-cited magnitude in scientific literature is M 8.5 which has been regarded as an overestimate due to the limited technological advancements and instrumentation during the period which the earthquake occurred. On the moment magnitude scale which measures an earthquake with respect to its physical parameters, it is estimated at M_{w} 7.9. The International Seismological Centre also catalogs the earthquake at M_{w} 7.9.

About 230 km (140 mi) of surface faulting was seen from Lijunbu through Ganyanchi to Jingtai. There were over 50,000 landslides in the epicentral area and ground cracking was widespread. Some rivers were dammed; others changed course. Seiches from this earthquake were observed in two lakes and three fjords in western Norway.

Field observations in the 1980s found 237 km (147 mi) of surface rupture along the Haiyuan Fault with a maximum horizontal offset of 6.5 m (21 ft) in the middle section of the rupture zone. The earthquake ruptured the section of the Haiyuan Fault between the Laohushan segment in the west and Liupanshan Thrust Fault to the east. The earthquake's epicenter is also likely near Haiyuan which is supported by the seismic intensity distribution.

== Damage and aftermath ==
Over 73,000 people were killed in Haiyuan County. A landslide buried the village of Sujiahe in Xiji County. More than 30,000 people were killed in Guyuan County. Nearly all the houses collapsed in the cities of Longde and Huining. Damage (VI–X) occurred in seven provinces and regions, including the major cities of Lanzhou, Taiyuan, Xi'an, Xining and Yinchuan. It was felt from the Yellow Sea to Qinghai (Tsinghai) Province and from Nei Mongol (Inner Mongolia) south to central Sichuan Province.

Since 2003, Chinese seismologists have calculated 258,707–273,407 to be the empirical verifiable range of death toll. Older sources put the deaths to be 234,117 or 235,502. Either way, it is one of the most fatal earthquakes in China, in turn making it one of the worst disasters in China by death toll.

Many more perished because of cold: frequent aftershocks caused the survivors to fear building anything other than temporary shelters, and a severe winter killed many who had lived through the original earthquake.

The Sufi Jahriyya Muslim Hui leader Ma Yuanzhang and his son died in the earthquake when the roof of the Mosque they were in collapsed in Zhangjiachuan. Some of the first responders to the worst-hit towns, such as Guyuan, were soldiers from the Chinese military garrison commanded by Lu Hongtao at nearby Pingliang who arrived within days, bringing in tents and relief goods and evacuating the wounded back to Pingliang by cart. Soup kitchens were also set up by gentry, merchants and other members of Guyuan’s community to serve the needy until transportation routes were restored and the markets were replenished. In other stricken communities, such as Jingning, tents and emergency relief were provided by the magistrate working out of the county government office. The Muslim General Ma Fuxiang was involved in relief efforts in Lanzhou during the earthquake.

== See also ==
- List of disasters in China by death toll
- List of earthquakes in China
- List of earthquakes in 1920
