= Gori, Georgia =

City in Shida Kartli, Georgia

Gori გორი
- City
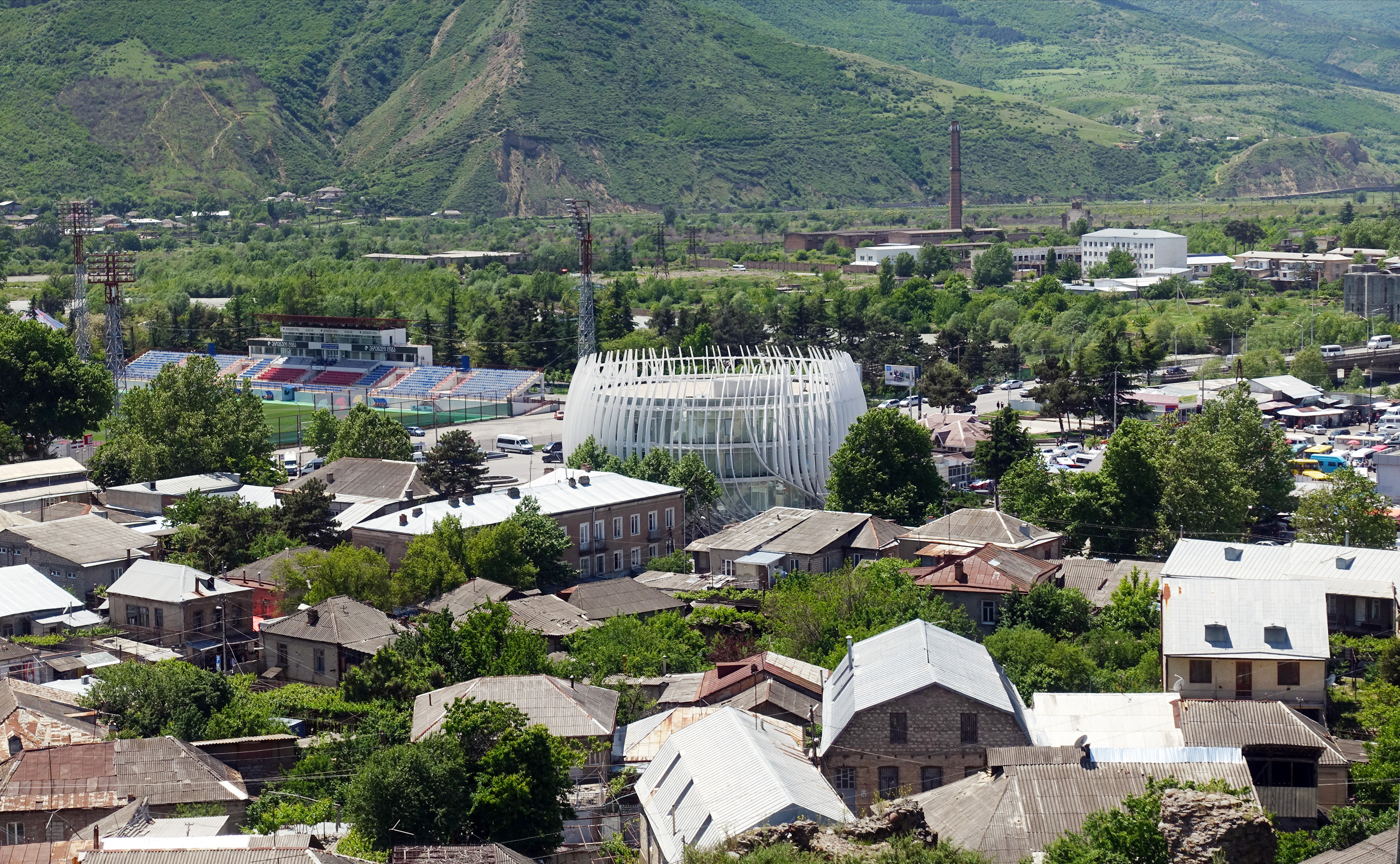
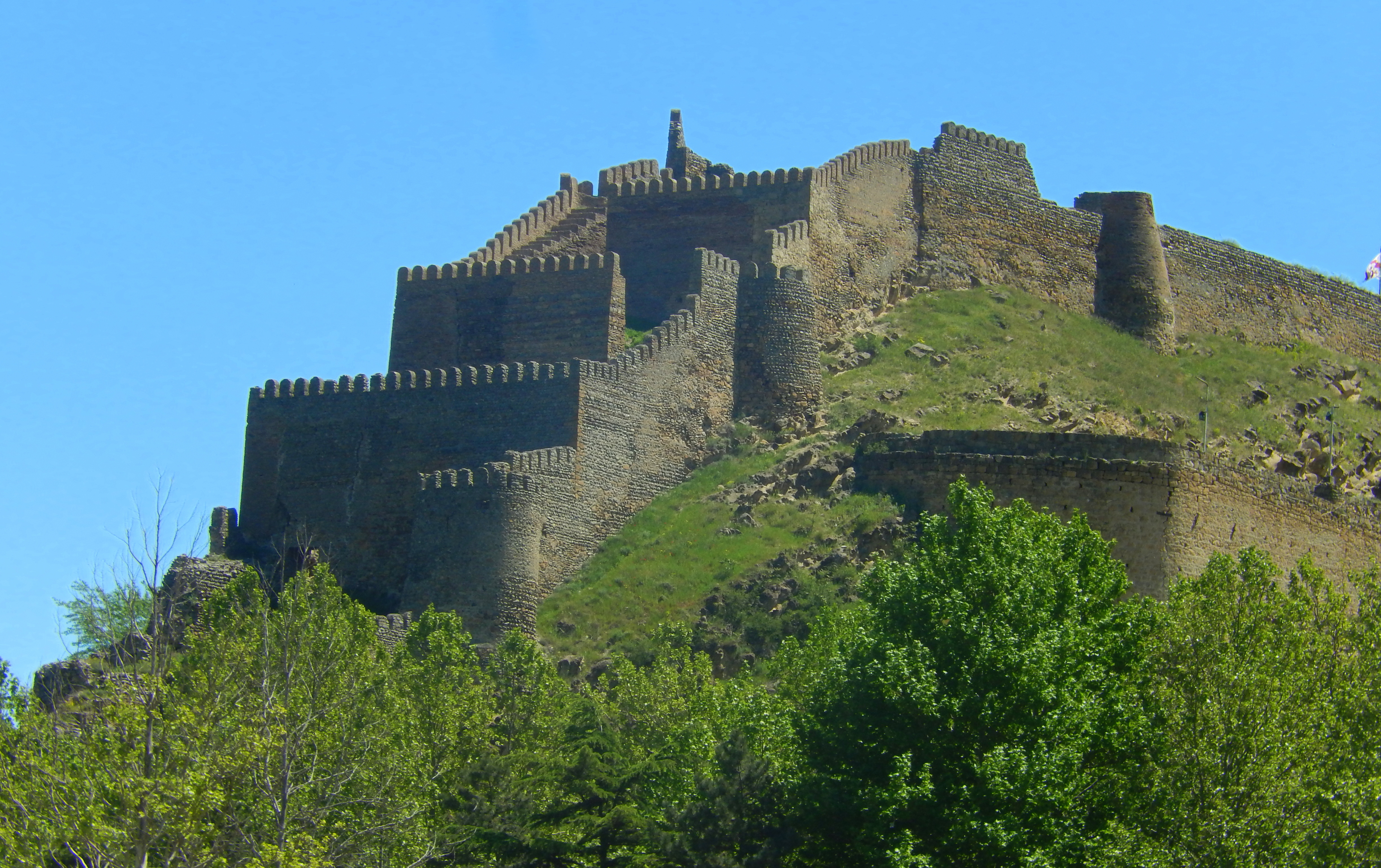
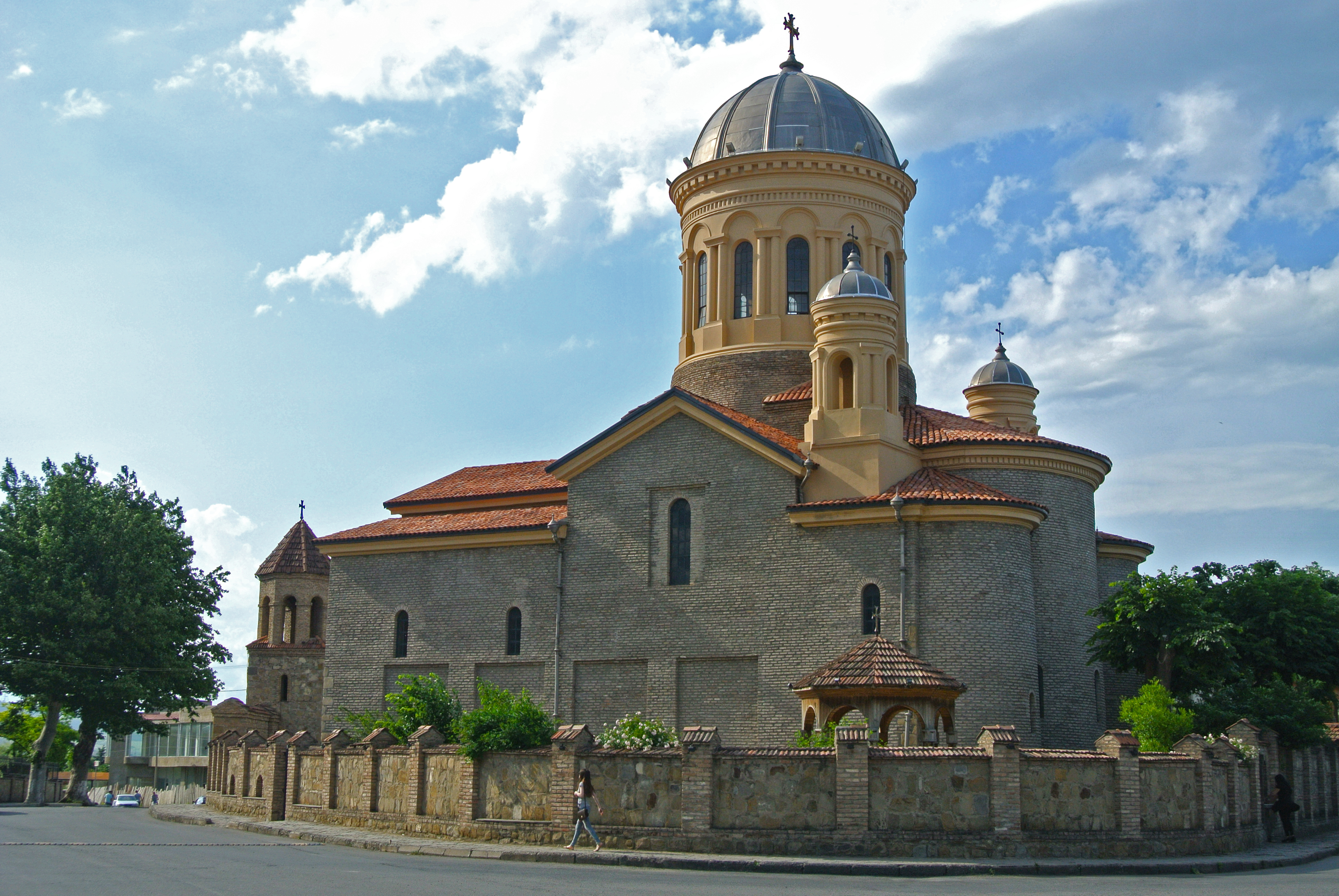
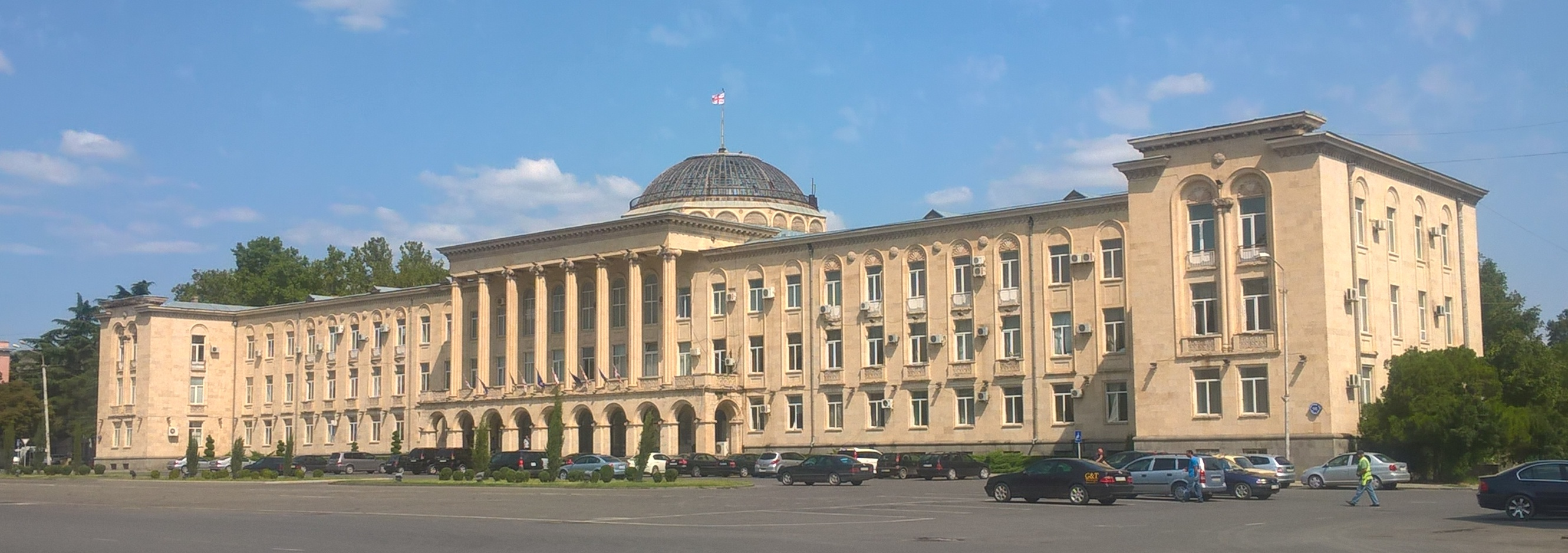
- View of Gori Gori fortress Gori Cathedral Church Gori City Hall

- Flag Seal
- Interactive map of Gori
- Location within Georgia Location within Shida Kartli
- Coordinates: 41°58′0″N 44°06′0″E
- Country: Georgia
- Region: Shida Kartli
- Municipality: Gori

Area
  - Total: 16.85 km^{2} (6.51 sq mi)
- Elevation: 588 m (1,929 ft)

Population (January 1, 2024)
  - Total: 42,596
  - Density: 2,528/km^{2} (6,547/sq mi)
- Time zone: UTC+4 (Georgian Time)
- Postal code: 1400
- Climate: Cfb
- Website: www.gori.gov.ge

Gori (Georgian: გორი [ˈɡoɾi]) is a city in eastern Georgia, which serves as the regional capital of Shida Kartli. It is located at the confluence of two rivers, the Mtkvari and the Liakhvi. Gori is the fifth most populous city in Georgia. Its name comes from the Georgian word gora (გორა), meaning "heap", "hill", or "mountain".

Gori was founded by King David IV (r. 1089–1125), who settled refugees from Armenia there. The Gori Fortress first appears in records from the 13th century, although archaeological evidence shows that the area had already been fortified in the final centuries BCE. Gori was an important military stronghold in the Middle Ages and maintains strategic importance due to its location on the principal highway connecting the eastern and western parts of Georgia. Gori has been invaded by the armies of regional powers several times over the course of its history. The city was occupied by Russian troops during the 2008 Russo-Georgian War.

Gori is also known as the birthplace of communist revolutionary and Soviet Union politician and leader Joseph Stalin, ballistic missile designer Aleksandr Nadiradze, and philosopher Merab Mamardashvili.

== Geography and climate ==
Gori is located 86 kilometres west of Georgia's capital Tbilisi, at the confluence of the rivers Mtkvari and Greater Liakhvi, 588 meters (1,929 ft) above sea level. The climate is humid subtropical, transitioning to humid continental climate, with warm and moderately humid weather. Summer is usually hot. The average annual temperature is 11.2 °C (52.2 °F), minimal in January (−0.4 °C or 31.3 °F) and maximal in July and August (22.1 °C or 71.8 °F). The maximum precipitation falls in May (65.8 mm or 2.6 in) and minimum in February (28.2 mm or 1.1 in). Precipitation here averages 507 mm (20.0 in).

Highest recorded temperature: 38.0 °C (100.4 °F) on 13 August 2006

Lowest recorded temperature: −22.2 °C (−8.0 °F) on 16 December 2004

Climate data for Gori (1991–2020 normals, extremes 1981–present)
Month	Jan	Feb	Mar	Apr	May	Jun	Jul	Aug	Sep	Oct	Nov	Dec	Year
Record high °C (°F)	15.6 (60.1)	20.5 (68.9)	26.4 (79.5)	30.5 (86.9)	32.0 (89.6)	36.8 (98.2)	37.4 (99.3)	38.0 (100.4)	36.6 (97.9)	30.9 (87.6)	25.0 (77.0)	20.0 (68.0)	38.0 (100.4)
Mean daily maximum °C (°F)	5.4 (41.7)	7.1 (44.8)	12.2 (54.0)	17.5 (63.5)	22.2 (72.0)	26.3 (79.3)	29.1 (84.4)	29.7 (85.5)	25.0 (77.0)	19.1 (66.4)	11.8 (53.2)	6.5 (43.7)	17.7 (63.9)
Mean daily minimum °C (°F)	−3.3 (26.1)	−2.7 (27.1)	1.0 (33.8)	5.1 (41.2)	9.9 (49.8)	14.0 (57.2)	17.2 (63.0)	17.0 (62.6)	12.8 (55.0)	7.4 (45.3)	1.4 (34.5)	−2.2 (28.0)	6.5 (43.7)
Record low °C (°F)	−19.6 (−3.3)	−19.9 (−3.8)	−15.1 (4.8)	−10.5 (13.1)	−1.0 (30.2)	2.8 (37.0)	7.7 (45.9)	6.1 (43.0)	−0.2 (31.6)	−4.8 (23.4)	−11.5 (11.3)	−22.2 (−8.0)	−22.2 (−8.0)
Average precipitation mm (inches)	29.0 (1.14)	28.2 (1.11)	35.7 (1.41)	53.1 (2.09)	65.8 (2.59)	58.7 (2.31)	41.3 (1.63)	36.6 (1.44)	35.2 (1.39)	41.9 (1.65)	47.4 (1.87)	33.7 (1.33)	506.6 (19.94)
Average precipitation days (≥ 1.0 mm)	6.4	6	6.8	8.3	10.1	8.5	5.6	5.1	5.3	6.8	6.8	6.6	82.3
Source: NCEI

== History ==
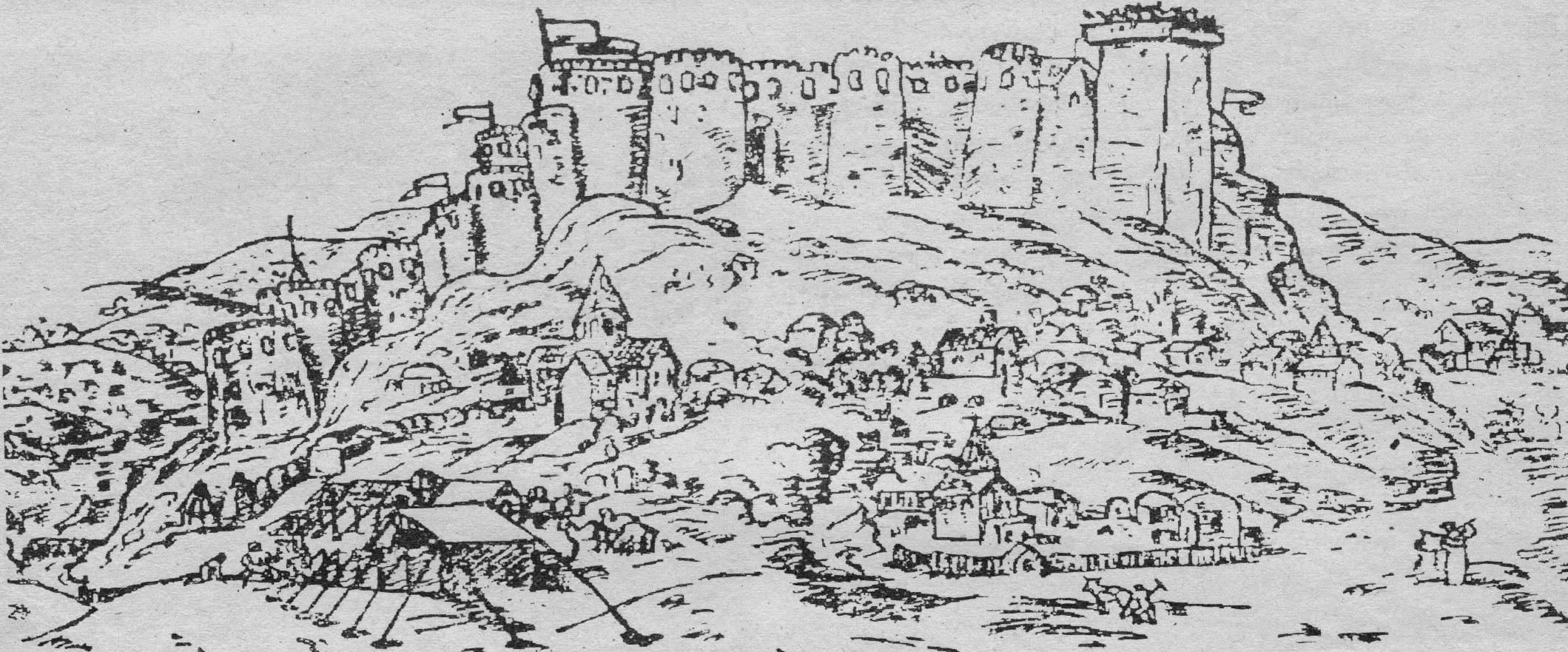
Gori Fortress as of 1642, by an Italian missionary, Cristoforo Castelli

The territory of Gori has been populated since the early Bronze Age. According to medieval Georgian chronicles, the town of Gori was founded by King David IV (r. 1089–1125) who settled refugees from Armenia there. However, the fortress of Gori (Goris-Tsikhe) appears to have been in use already in the 7th century, and archaeological evidence indicates the existence of an urban community in Classical Antiquity. In 1299, Gori was captured by the Alan tribesmen fleeing the Mongol conquest of their original homeland in the North Caucasus. The Georgian king George V recovered the town in 1320, pushing the Alans back over the Caucasus Mountains.

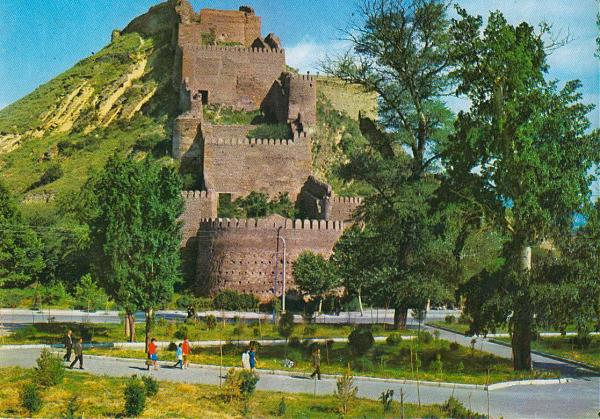
Gori Fortress on the hilltop

With the downfall of the medieval Georgian kingdom, Gori – strategically located at the crossroads of major transit routes – was frequently targeted by foreign invaders, and changed its masters on several occasions. It was first taken and sacked by Uzun Hassan of the Ak Koyunlu in 1477, followed by Tahmasp I of Persia in the mid-16th century. By the end of that century, Gori briefly passed to the Ottomans through the 1578–90 Ottoman–Persian War, and became their major outpost in Georgia until being recovered by the Georgians under Simon I of Kartli after heavy fighting in 1599. The town was once again garrisoned by the Persians under Shah Abbas I in 1614. Following successive occupations by the Ottomans (1723–35) and Persians (1735–40s), Gori returned to Georgian control under the kings Teimuraz II and Erekle II whose efforts helped to advance economy and culture in the town. Following the Russian annexation of Georgia, Gori was granted the status of a town within the Gori Uyezd of the Tiflis Governorate in 1801. It grew in size and population throughout the 19th century. A plan of 1824 shows the town on the hill slopes below the citadel, and a moat around it. The town was destroyed in the 1920 earthquake, and almost completely rebuilt in the Soviet period. An important industrial center in Soviet times, Gori suffered from an economic collapse and the outflow of the population during the years of a post-Soviet crisis of the 1990s.

Gori is close to the Georgian–Ossetian conflict zone. It is connected to breakaway South Ossetia's capital Tskhinvali via a railroad spur which has been defunct since the early 1990s. Since the 2000s, Georgia has increased the military infrastructure in and around the city. Thus, the Central Military Hospital was relocated from Tbilisi to Gori and re-equipped in October 2006. On January 18, 2008, Georgia's second NATO-standard base to accommodate the 1st Infantry Brigade (Georgia) of the Georgian Ground Forces was established at Gori. The Georgian Agrarian Science Academy Branch was established in the city in 1995; this became Sukhishvili University in 2003.

=== 2008 conflict ===
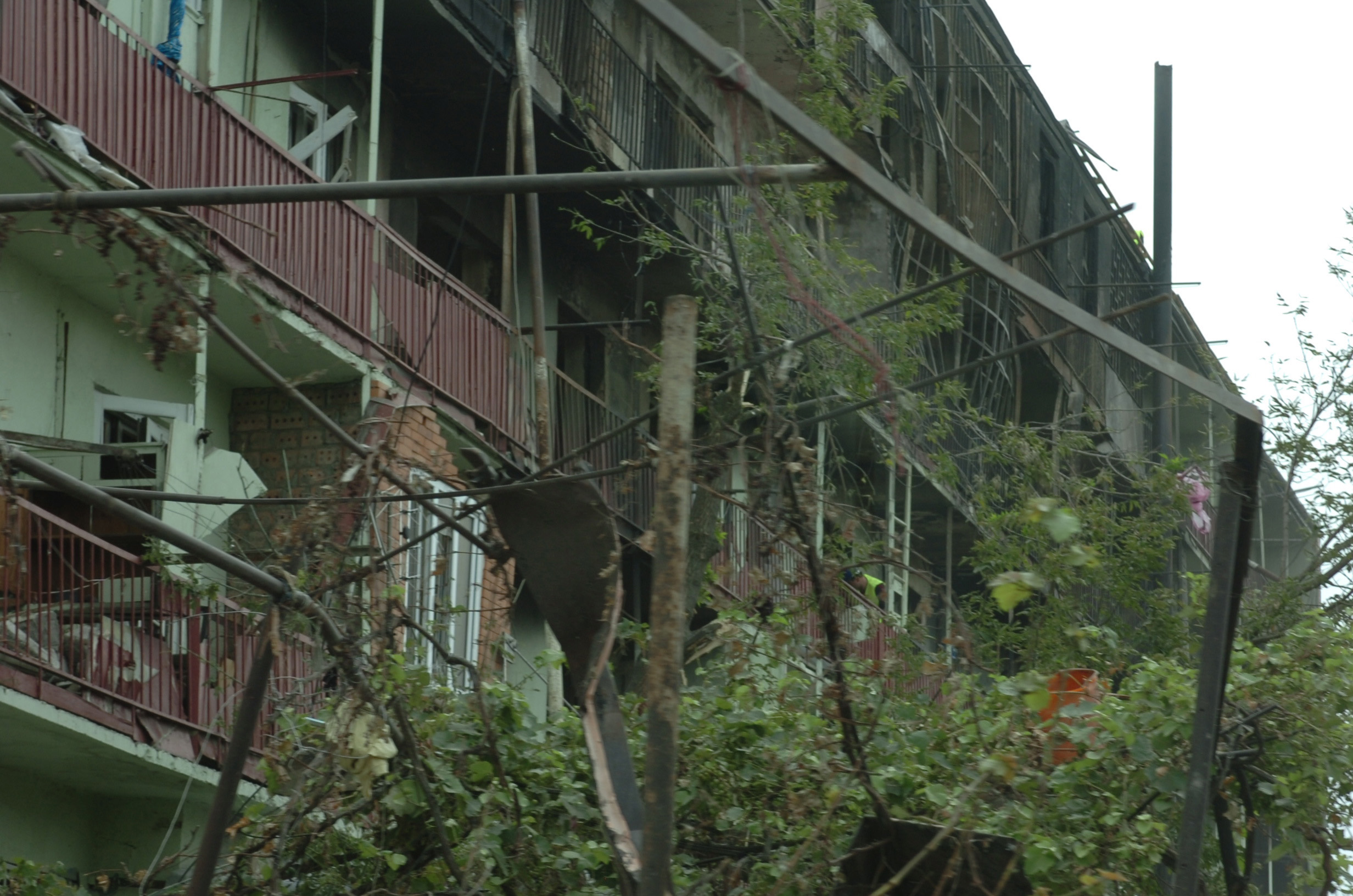
A damaged apartment building in Gori

In the 2008 Russo-Georgian War, the town came under aerial attack by the Russian Air Force from the outset of the conflict. Military targets and residential districts of Gori were hit by the airstrikes, resulting in civilian injuries and deaths. Human Rights Watch (HRW) claimed that Russian forces had indiscriminately deployed RBK-250 cluster bombs in civilian areas around Gori. According to HRW, on August 12 Russian forces dropped cluster bombs in the centre of Gori, killing 11 civilians and wounding dozens more. Russian military officials deny using cluster munitions in the conflict, calling the HRW assertion "slanderous" and questioning the HRW's objectivity. Numerous unexploded "bomblets" have been found by locals and HRW employees.

By August 11, Georgian military personnel, government, and most residents had fled the city, which was then captured and occupied by the Russian military and South Ossetian separatist militia. HRW subsequently accused the militia of unleashing a campaign of looting, arson, kidnapping and other attacks against the remaining civilian population. The Russian and South Ossetian forces withdrew from the city on August 22, 2008. The following day Units of the Georgian Army returned to Gori. However, Russian checkpoints remained near Gori as well as in so-called buffer zones near the borders with Abkhazia and South Ossetia.

== Demographics ==
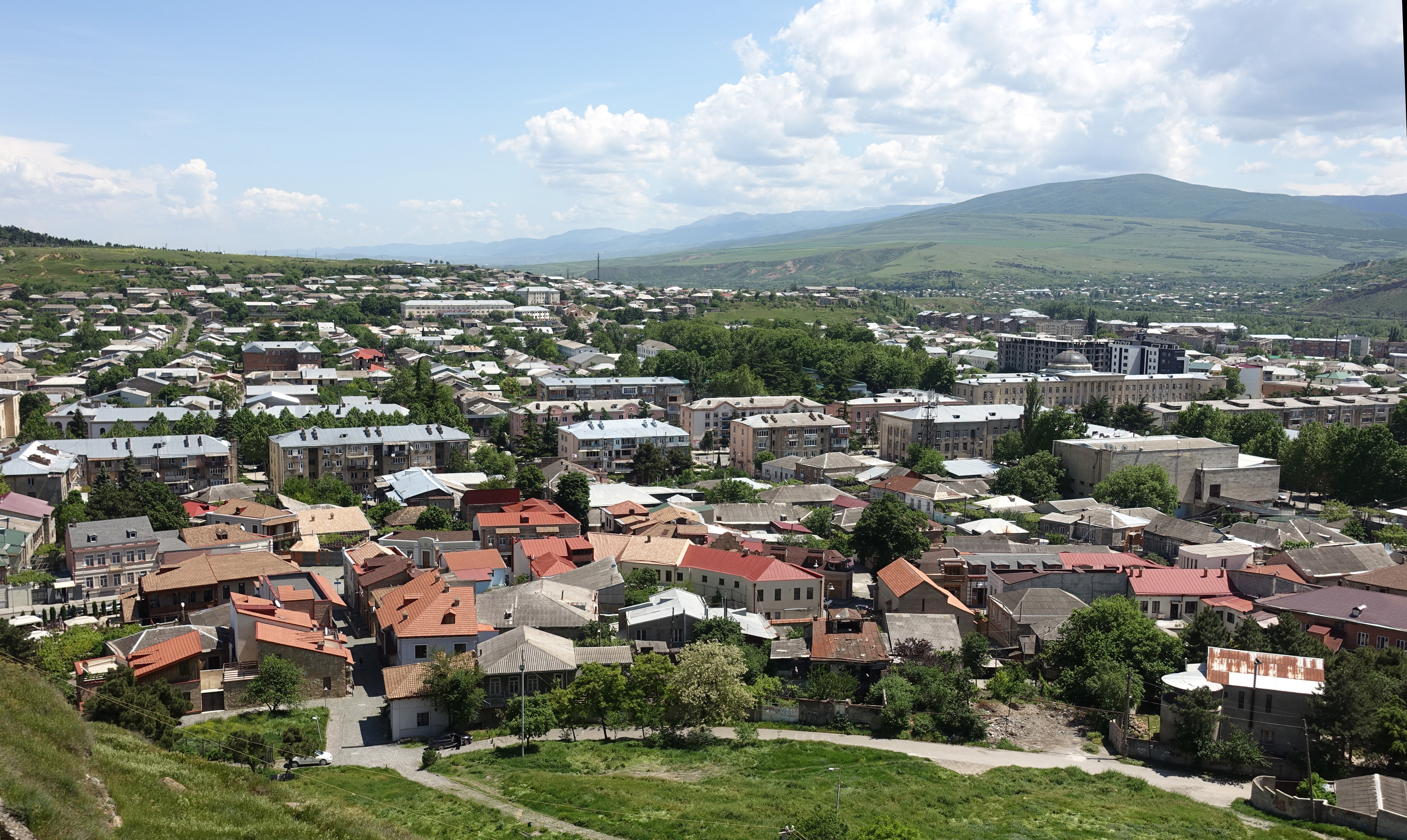
View of Gori

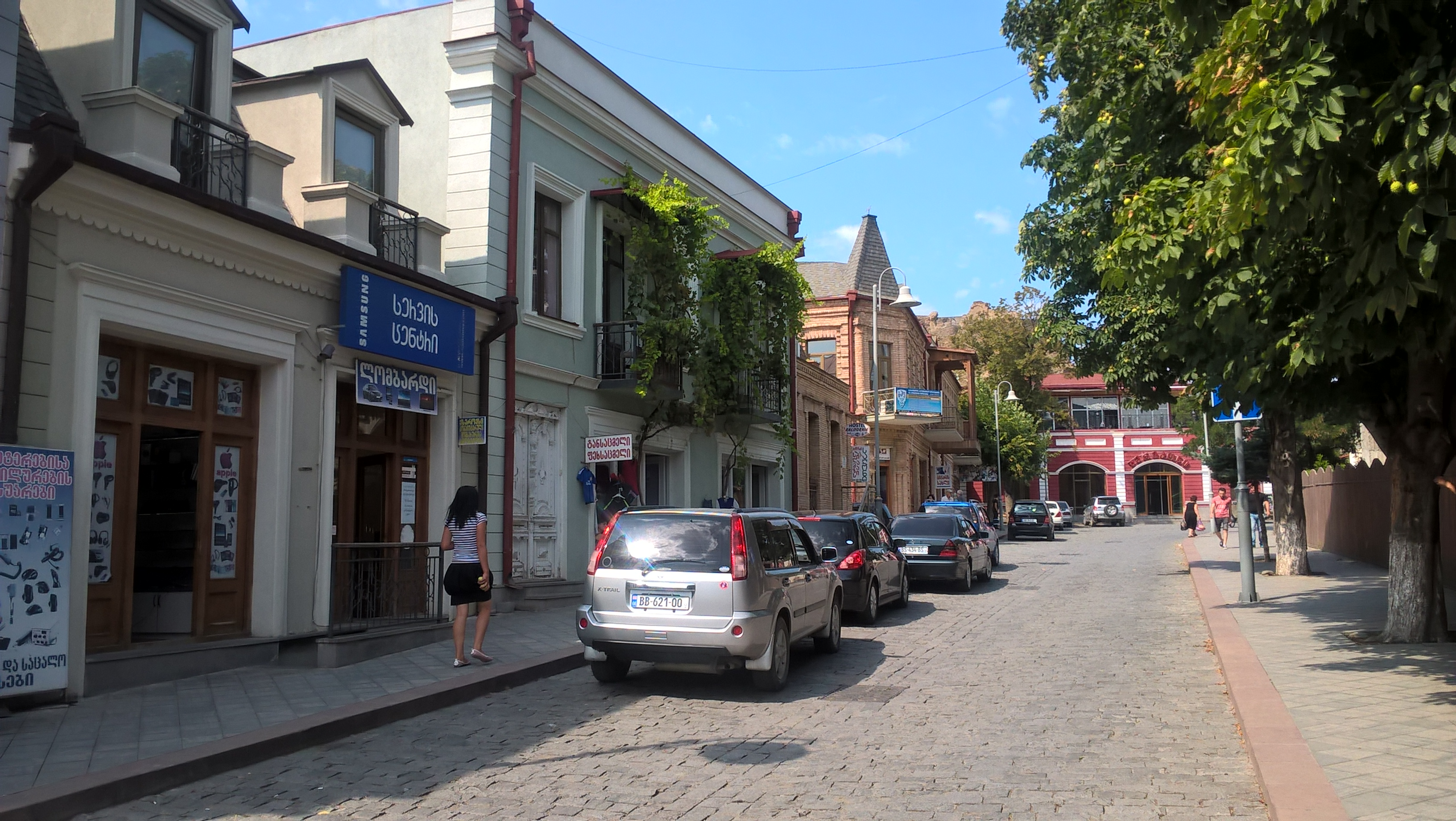
Akaki Tsereteli street

Year	1865	1897	1914	1916	1977	1989	2002	2014	2022	2023
Population	5,100	10,269	25,355	18,454	54,100	68,924	49,522	48,143	44,524	44,387

View chart definition.

== Landmarks ==
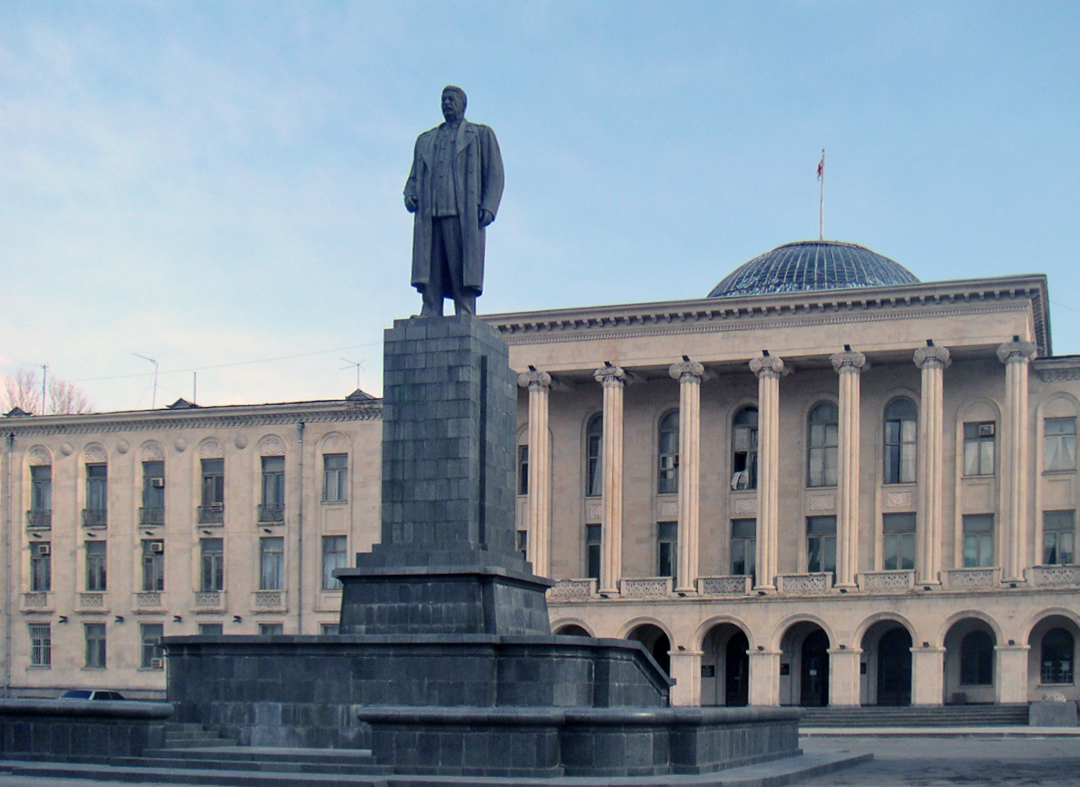
Statue of Stalin stood outside the Town Hall until being removed in 2010 as part of the country's de-Sovietization process

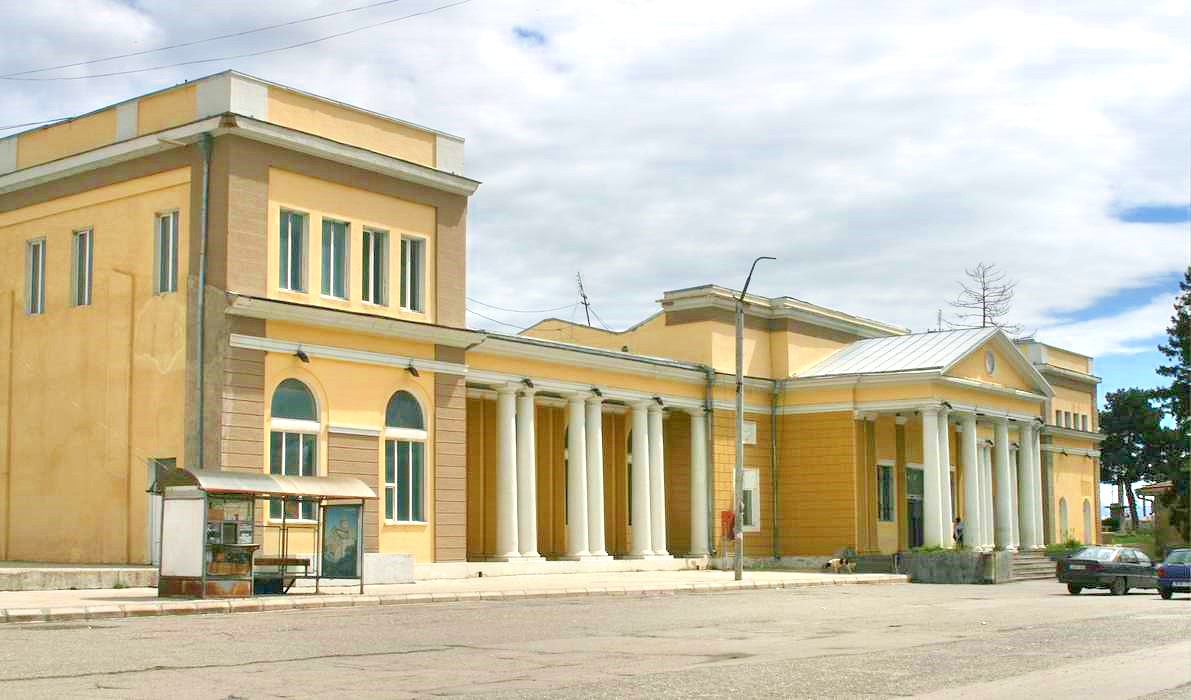
Gori train station

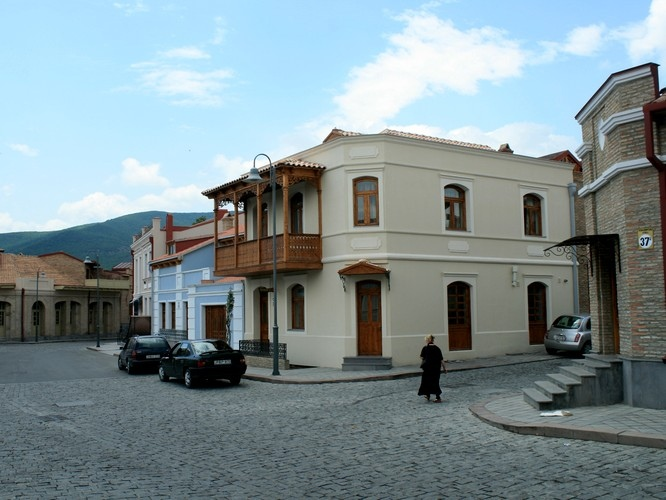
Akaki Tsereteli street in Gori

Gori and its environs house several notable cultural and historical landmarks. Although for many foreigners Gori is principally known as the birthplace of Joseph Stalin, in Georgian historical memory the city has long been associated with its citadel, the Gori Fortress, which is built on a cliffy hill overlooking the central part of the modern city. On another hill stands the 18th century St. George's church of Gorijvari, a popular place of pilgrimage. The famous ancient rock-hewn town of Uplistsikhe and the 7th century Ateni Sioni Church are located not far from Gori.

Stalin's association with the city is emphasized by the Joseph Stalin Museum in downtown Gori and, until recently, the Stalin monument in front of the Gori City Hall, one of the few such monuments to survive Nikita Khrushchev's de-Stalinization program. The monument was a source of controversy in a newly independent Georgia in the 1990s, but for several years the post-communist government acceded to the Gori citizens' request and left the statue untouched. It was ultimately removed on June 25, 2010. However, on 20 December 2012, the municipal assembly of Gori voted to reinstate the monument.

== Administrative divisions ==
Gori is divided into 11 administrative districts, they are:

No.	District	No.	District	No.	District	No.	District
1	Kvernaki Settlement	4	Tsmindatskali 2nd Locality	7	Chala-Tskarosubani Settlement	10	Central Settlement 1st Locality
2	Verkhvebi Settlement	5	IDPs Settlement	8	Kombinati Settlement 1st Locality	11	Central Settlement 2nd Locality
3	Tsmindatskali 1st Locality	6	Sadguri-Elektripikatsia Settlement	9	Kombinati Settlement 2nd Locality		

== Notable people ==
Joseph Stalin

- Joseph Stalin (1878–1953), revolutionary, political theorist, 2nd Leader of the Soviet Union, and 4th Premier of the Soviet Union
- Anastasia Eristavi-Khoshtaria (1868-1951), novelist
- Simon Arshaki Ter-Petrosian (1882–1922), revolutionary
- Vano Muradeli (1908–1970), composer
- Aleksandre Machavariani (1913–1995), composer
- Aleksandr Nadiradze (1914–1987), inventor
- Edvard Mirzoyan (1921–2012), composer
- Sulkhan Tsintsadze (1925–1991), composer
- Merab Mamardashvili (1930–1990), philosopher
- Shota Chochishvili (1950-2009), judoka, first Soviet Olympic champion in Judo
- Giorgi Tenadze (born 1962), wrestler
- Vazha Tarkhnishvili (born 1971), footballer
- Georgi Kandelaki (born 1974), boxer, world champion
- Lasha Shavdatuashvili (born 1992), judoka, Olympic & world champion
- Geno Petriashvili (born 1994), wrestler, Olympic champion & world champion
- Oto Nemsadze (born 1989), singer
- Vladimer Khinchegashvili (born 1991), wrestler, Olympic & World Champion
- Vladimir Modosyan (born 1958), was a Soviet and Armenian wrestler and coach.
- Giorgi Mujaridze (born 1998), Georgian Shot putter

== Important sights ==
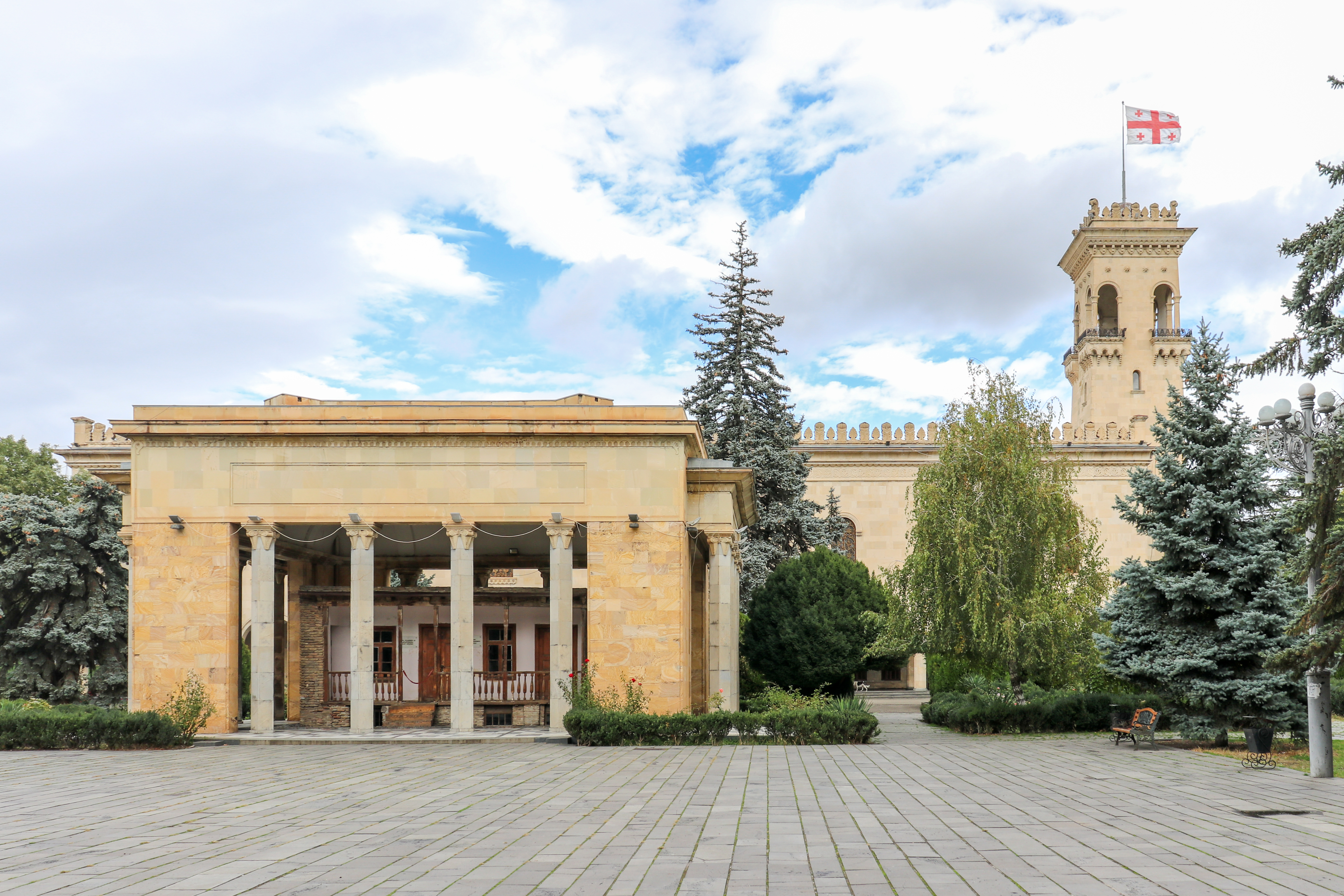
Joseph Stalin Museum

- Gori Fortress
- Gori Cathedral of Saint Mary
- Gori State Historical-Ethnographic Museum
- Joseph Stalin State Museum
- House of Amilakhvris
- Monument to Nikoloz Baratashvili
- Monument to Iakob Gogebashvili
- Gori Pedagogical Institute
- Gori State Drama Theater
- Gori State Historical-Ethnographic Museum
- Gorijvari
- Erekle Baths
- Monument to Giorgi Eristavi
- Monument to Nico Lomouri
- Military city
- Theological School
