= 1927 Ljubinje earthquake =

Strong earthquake in Bosnia and Herzegovina

- Location within Bosnia and Herzegovina
- UTC time: 1927-02-14 03:43:24
- ISC event: 909090
- USGS-ANSS: ComCat
- Local date: 14 February 1927
- Magnitude: 5.8–6.0 M_{L}
- Depth: 18 km (11 mi)
- Epicenter: 43.00°N 18.10°E

On 14 February 1927 at 03:43 UTC, a strong earthquake shook Yugoslavia (now Bosnia and Herzegovina). Damage occurred in Eastern Herzegovina; Ljubinje was the worst affected town. Serious damage and injuries were also reported in the town of Stolac, while deaths occurred in the village of Berkovići. This may be the strongest known earthquake in Eastern Herzegovina.

== Earthquake ==
The magnitude of the earthquake was M_{L}6.0 or M_{L}5.8 and the epicentral intensity was VIII (Severe) on the Mercalli–Cancani–Sieberg intensity scale. The location of the epicentre was 43.00°N 18.10°E, about 6 kilometres (3.7 mi) north of Ljubinje, while the depth of the earthquake was 18 km (11 mi).

The geology of the epicentral area is karstic with steep mountains and valleys, characteristic of the Outer Dinarides. The Dinarides, including the Ljubinje area, are seismically active. Known faults with significant activity include Ljubinje–Stolac–Široki Brijeg, Trebinje to Tihaljina, and Trebinje to Gacko.

== Damage ==
The two larger towns in the epicentral area, Ljubinje and Stolac, suffered significant damage. Ljubinje was the worse hit of the two. Every house in the town suffered damage. An Ottoman fortification constructed out of large stone blocks, then home of the local judge, partially collapsed, but no one was harmed. Some of the collapsed homes trapped the inhabitants, but no fatalities were reported. The Ljubinje elementary school was rendered unusable. The first floor collapsed onto the classrooms on the ground floor.

In Stolac, many houses were hit and several inhabitants lightly injured by earthquake-induced rockfalls. Many houses suffered cracked walls and collapsed roofs, but none were completely destroyed. An old man riding a horse was thrown on the ground and possibly injured. In the village of Berkovići, a boulder rolling down the mountainside destroyed the house of a local farmer, killing two of his children. Six other family members suffered permanent injuries. In many villages in the epicentral area, houses were completely destroyed—turned into "stony holes".

The Bregava in Stolac was reduced to a trickle after the earthquake. The Suhavić stream in Berkovići went dry. The partly subterranean river Vrijeka stopped after the shock, then began flowing out of a different cave twenty-four hours later.

A mosque in Neum, 40 km (25 mi) from the epicentre, was destroyed in 1927 by an earthquake, likely this one.

== See also ==
- 2022 Bosnia and Herzegovina earthquake
- 1996 Ston–Slano earthquake
- List of earthquakes in 1927
- List of earthquakes in Bosnia and Herzegovina
