= 2022 Bosnia and Herzegovina earthquake =

Earthquake in southern Herzegovina

2022 Bosnia and Herzegovina earthquake Zemljotres u Bosni i Hercegovini 2022
- Location within Bosnia and Herzegovina
- UTC time: 2022-04-22 21:07:48
- ISC event: 622413884
- USGS-ANSS: ComCat
- Local date: 22 April 2022
- Local time: 23:07 CEST (UTC+2)
- Magnitude: 6.1 M_{L} 5.7 M_{w}
- Depth: 10.0 km (6.2 mi)
- Epicenter: 43.06°N 18.18°E
- Areas affected: Bosnia and Herzegovina, Croatia, Montenegro, Serbia
- Max. intensity: MMI VIII (Severe); EMS-98 VIII (Heavily damaging)
- Aftershocks: 40. Largest is M_{w}4.8
- Casualties: 1 dead, 14 injured

On 22 April 2022 at 23:07 local time (CEST, 21:07 UTC), a magnitude 5.7 earthquake struck southern Bosnia and Herzegovina. The epicentre was in the Herzegovinian village of Strupići, roughly 10 km (6.2 mi) east of Stolac or 14 km (8.7 mi) from Ljubinje or Nevesinje. It is the country's fifth largest earthquake, as well as its most significant since the 1969 Banja Luka earthquake.

== Tectonic setting ==
The southern part of Bosnia and Herzegovina lies within the External Dinarides. The Dinarides are a mountain range that was formed by the collision between the Adriatic Plate and the Eurasian Plate, a process that began in the Middle to Late Jurassic with obduction of ophiolites onto the Adriatic margin. By the Late Cretaceous to Paleocene this process began to involve the carbonate platforms of the Adriatic Plate. These platforms were like the present day Bahamas, with areas of thick carbonate development, such as the Apulia Platform, separated by zones of deeper water, such as most of the current Adriatic Sea. In this part of the External Dinarides, the fold and thrust belt is thin-skinned in type, involving four main thrust sheets, each representing different sequences within the platform with their own stratigraphy; the highest unit, the pre-Karst, which is thrust over the Karst unit, which is in turn thrust over the Dalmatian unit and that is thrust onto the undeformed Adriatic foreland offshore.

The southern part of the External Dinarides is moderately to highly seismically active. Historical earthquakes in this area include events near Dubrovnik in 1639 (M 6.2, Imax(maximum intensity)=VIII MCS) and 1667 (M7.1, Imax=IX EMS98), an event in 1850 near Ston (Imax=VIII–IX EMS98), an event 23 km west of the 2022 earthquake in 1907 (Io(intensity at epicenter)=VII–VIII MCS), the 1927 Ljubinje earthquake (M5.8–6.0, Io=VIII MCS), the 1979 Montenegro earthquake (M7.1, Imax=VIII EMS98) and the 1996 Ston–Slano earthquake (M6.0, Imax=VIII MSK).

== Earthquake ==
According to the Federal Hydrometeorological Service of Bosnia and Herzegovina (FHMZ BiH), the earthquake had a magnitude of M_{L}5.6 and a maximum Mercalli intensity of VIII (Severe) and occurred near Stolac. The USGS rated the earthquake at magnitude M_{w}5.7. They reported that it occurred 14 km north-northeast of Ljubinje at a depth of 10 km. According to the Croatian Seismological Service, the epicentre was near Ljubinje, the magnitude was 6.1 on the Richter scale, and the intensity was VIII (Heavily Damaging) on the European macroseismic scale (EMS-98).

Outside the epicentral area, the earthquake was felt strongly in Bosnia and Herzegovina's capital, Sarajevo, Montenegro's capital, Podgorica, and the Croatian region of Dalmatia. It was felt in much of southern Croatia, Montenegro, and also parts of Slovenia, Serbia, Albania, Kosovo, North Macedonia, Italy and northern Greece.

From an analysis of the main shock and the 7,217 aftershocks (M≥1.3) recorded in the next nine months, the earthquake is interpreted to have been caused by rupture on a ramp (dipping section) in the thrust at the base of the Dalmatian unit. This is consistent with both the focal mechanism for the earthquake and depth of its hypocenter and that of most of the aftershocks, which were all unusually deep for this part of the Dinarides.

== Impact ==
A 28-year-old woman was fatally injured after a boulder rolled down a hill and crashed through the roof of a house in Stolac, and died in hospital during attempted resuscitation. Her parents were hospitalised with light injuries. An official day of mourning was declared in Stolac for 24 April. Eight other people were injured, several while panicking due to the earthquake. As of 29 April, 300 households in Stolac have reported damage. The town school was among the damaged buildings.

The Municipality of Berkovići, where the epicentre lies, briefly lost power due to the earthquake. Herzegovina-Neretva Canton civil defence reported rockfalls on roads from Stolac to Mostar, Neum, Ljubinje and Berkovići. Numerous streets in Stolac and one in Mostar were blocked by fallen bricks, roof tiles and plaster. In Čapljina, several parked cars were damaged by debris falling from buildings. Four people were injured in Čapljina.

Several miners in a coal mine near Sarajevo sustained light injuries, four requiring medical attention. In Croatia, damage was caused to eleven buildings, including the Franciscan Church and a school in Dubrovnik. Small landslides also occurred on the Adriatic Highway in Župa dubrovačka and near Slivno. In Montenegro, traffic on the Belgrade–Bar railway was interrupted.

An aftershock measuring M_{w}4.8 struck on 24 April with an intensity of VI (Strong) on the Modified Mercalli Intensity Scale, causing further damage to buildings, including a 19th-century Austro-Hungarian military barracks building.

== See also ==
- List of earthquakes in 2022
- List of earthquakes in Bosnia and Herzegovina
