= List of earthquakes in Bosnia and Herzegovina =

This incomplete list lists earthquakes that had epicentres within the current borders of Bosnia and Herzegovina or otherwise had a significant impact on the country.

Date	Epicentre	Mag.	Intensity	Deaths	Notes
6 January 1905	Krupanj, Serbia	5.3	VII		
7 April 1905	Petrovac	5.0	VII		
1 August 1907	Počitelj	5.7	VII–VIII		
25 December 1908	Vlasenica	5.3	VI–VII		
8 October 1909	Pokupsko, Croatia	6.0	IX		
12 March 1916	Bihać	5.0	VII		
6 February 1923	Jajce	5.0	VII		
15 March 1923	Imotski, Croatia	6.2	VIII–IX	2	Two women died in Drinovci. A tobacco factory in Mostar was destroyed.
14 February 1927	Ljubinje	6.0	VIII	2	Ljubinje was hit severely. Two children died in Berkovići. Many houses were damaged in Stolac and local villages, some completely levelled. See 1927 Ljubinje earthquake.
17 December 1940	Derventa	5.1	VII		
31 December 1950	Drugovići	5.7	VIII		About 25 km NE of Banja Luka.
11 June 1962	Treskavica	6.0	VIII		
13 April 1964	Dilj Mountain, Croatia	5.7	VIII		
7 March 1967	Srebrenica	5.1	VII		
27 October 1969	Banja Luka	6.6	IX	15	A total of 15 people died and over a thousand were injured. The city of Banja Luka was devastated, with over 86,000 apartments destroyed. See 1969 Banja Luka earthquake.
25 August 1970	Gacko	5.0	VII		
7 September 1970	Knin, Croatia	5.3	VIII		
29 October 1974	Lukavac	5.0	VII		
15 April 1979	Ulcinj, Montenegro	7.1	IX		See 1979 Montenegro earthquake
13 August 1981	Banja Luka	5.5	VIII		44 people injured and damage in Banja Luka. Also felt in western Hungary and in Trieste, Italy.
23 May 2004	Grude	5.5	VI–VII		There was a rockfall at the Blue Lake, and the water level of the Vrljika decreased by several metres. The worst damage occurred in Sovići. The earthquake was probably caused by the reverse Imotski Fault.
21 February 2015	Tuzla	3.6	IV	4	Four people killed and one injured due to a landslide in a mine near Tuzla.
26 November 2019	Blagaj, Mostar	5.4	VII		
29 December 2020	Petrinja, Croatia	6.4	IX		Buildings were damaged in the Una–Sana Canton and northern Republika Srpska. The town of Kostajnica suffered the worst damages. The earthquake started six building fires in Kostajnica, and the town hall was rendered unusable. See 2020 Petrinja earthquake
22 April 2022	Strupići	5.7	VIII	1	One woman died in Stolac. There was damage in much of southern Herzegovina. See 2022 Bosnia and Herzegovina earthquake.
30 December 2023	Ljubetovo	4.7	VI		Four people were injured as the earthquake struck near the city of Zenica. Material damage and landslides were reported in the surrounding areas.
Note: The inclusion criteria for adding events are based on WikiProject Earthquakes' notability guideline that was developed for stand alone articles. The principles described also apply to lists. In summary, only damaging, injurious, or deadly events should be recorded.

== See also ==
- List of earthquakes in Croatia
- List of earthquakes in Slovenia
- List of earthquakes in Albania
