= 1927 Crimean earthquakes =

Earthquakes in the Black Sea near Crimea

- Location within Crimea
- UTC time: 1927-09-11 22:15:51
- ISC event: 909503
- USGS-ANSS: ComCat
- Local date: September 12, 1927
- Local time: 00:15
- Magnitude: 6.7 M_{w}
- Depth: 35 km (22 mi)
- Epicenter: 44.428°N 34.422°E
- Type: Unknown
- Areas affected: Yalta, Crimea
- Max. intensity: MSK-64 VIII (Damaging)
- Tsunami: Yes
- Foreshocks: 6.0 (est) June 26 at 11:20 UTC
- Aftershocks: 4.9 (est) Sept 16 at 08:21 UTC
- Casualties: 12

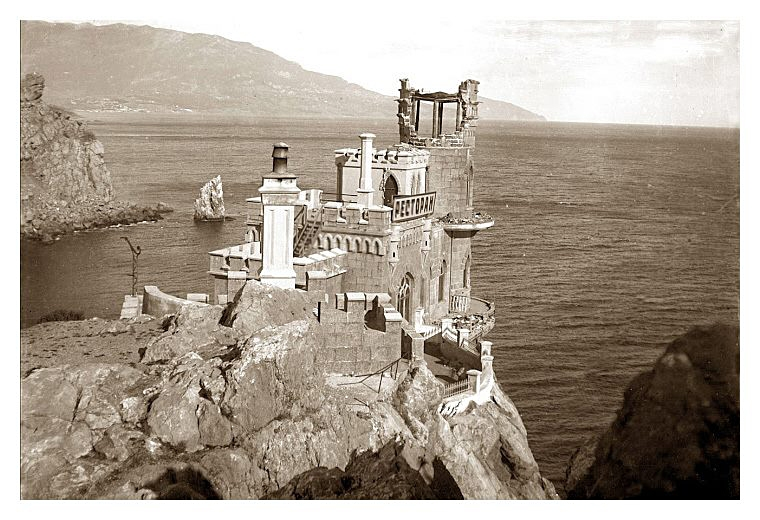
Swallow's nest. Consequences of the June earthquake of 1927.

The 1927 Crimean earthquakes occurred in the month of June and again in September in the waters of the Black Sea near the Crimean Peninsula. Each of the submarine earthquakes in the sequence triggered tsunami. The June event was moderate relative to the large September 11 event, which had at least one aftershock that also generated a tsunami. Following the large September event, natural gas that was released from the sea floor created flames that were visible along the coastline, and was accompanied by bright flashes and explosions.

== June 26 event ==
The June shock was a strong event with a magnitude of 6.0 that caused a nondestructive tsunami along the coast. The shock occurred at a depth of 27 kilometres (17 mi) on the submarine slope near Yalta. The shock's intensity was gauged to be VII–VIII (Very strong–Damaging) on the Medvedev–Sponheuer–Karnik scale. Tide gauge stations recorded waves with a maximum amplitude of 16 centimetres (6.3 in) at Yalta, 14 centimetres (5.5 in) at Yevpatoria, and 8 centimetres (3.1 in) at Feodosia.

== September 11 event ==
The September event struck the Crimean Peninsula with a moment magnitude of 6.7 at a depth of 35 kilometres (22 mi). This destructive earthquake occurred at 22:15 UTC and was recorded by several early seismographs. The shock was centered about 20 kilometres (12 mi) southeast of Yalta and had a maximum perceived intensity of VIII (Damaging) on the Medvedev–Sponheuer–Karnik scale. Near the epicentral region, fishermen reported disturbance of the sea, with tidal gauges recording 53 cm (21 in) waves at Yevpatoria and 35 cm (14 in) waves in Yalta.

Numerous, very large flames were seen offshore Sevastopol, Cape Lucullus, and Yalta in the early morning following the September event. Several types of fire and flame were described by witnesses. Pale flames were up to 2,000 metres (6,600 ft) wide and up to 500 metres (1,600 ft) in height, and were visible for several minutes at a time. Other flames began with a whitish glow and became bright red; this style of flame sometimes burned for more than an hour. Bright flashes and explosions were also reported. The flames and explosions were attributed to methane or other hydrocarbon gasses that had been released from the seabed and spontaneously combusted in Phosphine (a self-igniting gas).

== September 16 event ==
An aftershock that was estimated to have a magnitude of 4.9 occurred on September 16 at 08:21 UTC. The shock was described as weak, but the sea receded at Balaklava Bay.

== See also ==
- 1901 Black Sea earthquake
- List of earthquakes in 1927
