= Bančići =

Bančići Банчићи
- Village
- Location within Bosnia and Herzegovina
- Coordinates: 42.9696682°N 17.9771518°E
- Country: Bosnia and Herzegovina
- Entity: Republika Srpska; Federation of Bosnia and Herzegovina
- Canton: Herzegovina-Neretva
- Municipality: Ljubinje; Stolac

Area
  - Total: 20.20 km^{2} (7.80 sq mi)

Population (2013)
  - Total: 40
  - Density: 2.0/km^{2} (5.1/sq mi)
- Time zone: UTC+1 (CET)
  - Summer (DST): UTC+2 (CEST)

Bančići (Cyrillic: Банчићи) is a village in the municipalities Ljubinje, Republika Srpska, and Stolac, Bosnia and Herzegovina.

== Demographics ==
According to the 2013 census, its population was 40, all (39 Serbs and a Croat) living in the Ljubinje part and nil in the Stolac part.
