= Žegulja =

Žegulja Жегуља
- Village
- Location within Bosnia and Herzegovina
- Coordinates: 43°01′N 18°01′E
- Country: Bosnia and Herzegovina
- Entity: Republika Srpska; Federation of Bosnia and Herzegovina
- Canton: Herzegovina-Neretva
- Municipality: Berkovići; Stolac

Area
  - Total: 6.08 sq mi (15.76 km^{2})

Population (2013)
  - Total: 66
  - Density: 11/sq mi (4.2/km^{2})
- Time zone: UTC+1 (CET)
  - Summer (DST): UTC+2 (CEST)

Žegulja (Serbian Cyrillic: Жегуља) is a village in the municipalities of Berkovići, Republika Srpska, and Stolac, the Herzegovina-Neretva Canton, the Federation of Bosnia and Herzegovina, Bosnia and Herzegovina. The official name of the settlement was "Gornji (Upper) Poplat".

== Geography ==
Žegulja is a place located in East Herzegovina.

== Demographics ==
According to the Census in 1991, the village had 287 inhabitants.

According to the 2013 census, its population was 55 in the Berkovići part and 11 Bosniaks in the Stolac part.

Ethnicity in 2013
Ethnicity	Number	Percentage
Bosniaks	53	80.3%
Serbs	13	19.7%
Total	66	100%

== See also ==
- Berkovići
- East Herzegovina
