= Poplat, Stolac =

Poplat
- Village
- Location within Bosnia and Herzegovina
- Coordinates: 43.033821°N 17.9972791°E
- Country: Bosnia and Herzegovina
- Entity: Republika Srpska; Federation of Bosnia and Herzegovina
- Canton: Herzegovina-Neretva
- Municipality: Berkovići; Stolac

Area
  - Total: 15.15 sq mi (39.23 km^{2})

Population (2013)
  - Total: 1,402
  - Density: 92.56/sq mi (35.74/km^{2})
- Time zone: UTC+1 (CET)
  - Summer (DST): UTC+2 (CEST)

Poplat is a village in the municipalities of Berkovići, Republika Srpska, and Stolac, the Herzegovina-Neretva Canton, the Federation of Bosnia and Herzegovina, Bosnia and Herzegovina.

== Demographics ==
According to the 2013 census, its population was zero in the Berkovići part and 1,402 in the Stolac part.

Ethnicity in 2013
Ethnicity	Number	Percentage
Croats	1,249	89.1%
Bosniaks	111	7.9%
Serbs	33	2.4%
other/undeclared	9	0.6%
Total	1,402	100%
