= Straževica (archaeological site) =

Archaeological site in Berkovići Municipality, Bosnia and Herzegovina

- Prahistorijska gradina Straževica
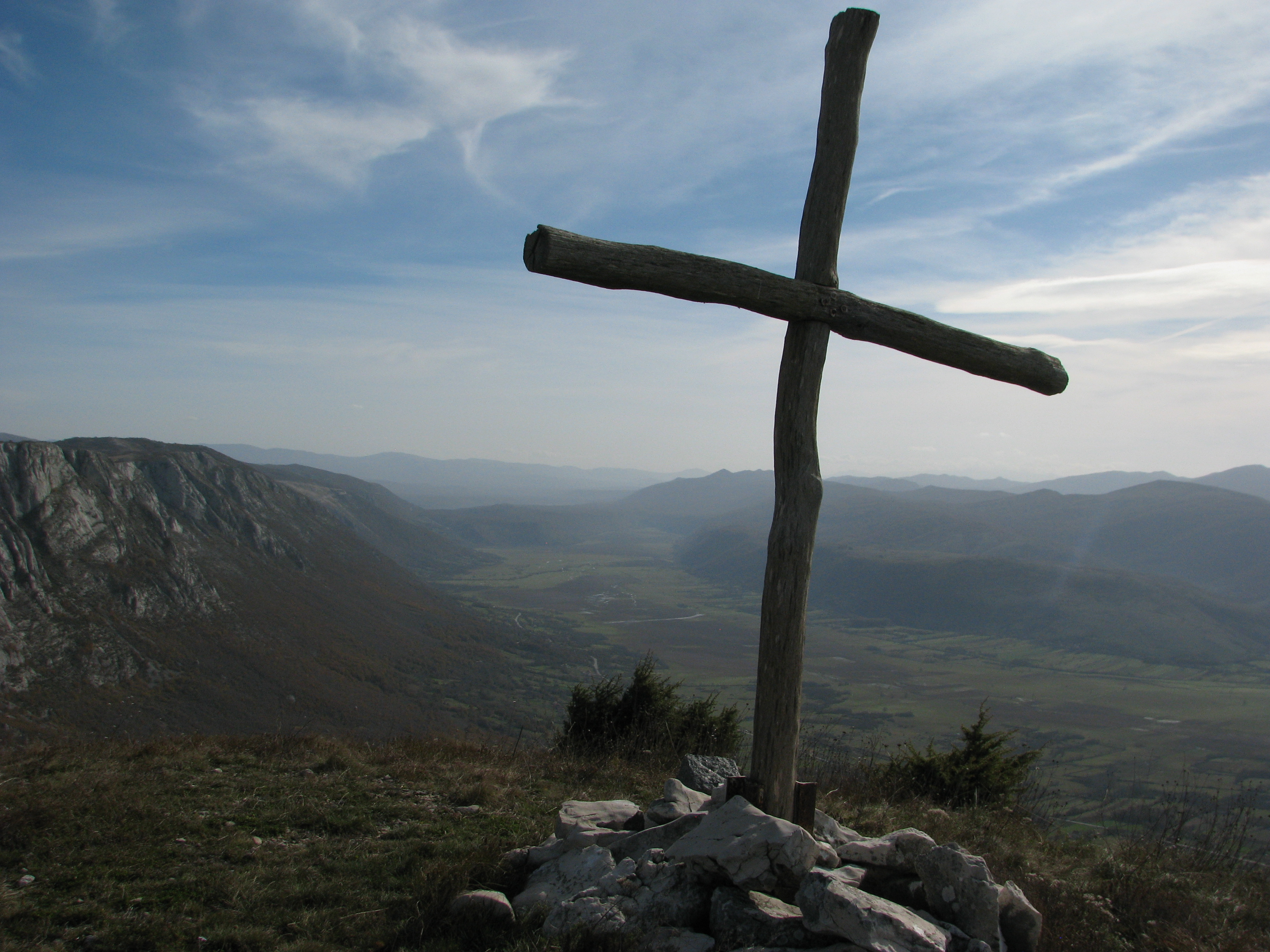
- Prehistoric hillfort Straževica

- Location within Republika Srpska Location within Bosnia and Herzegovina
- 43°06′49″N 18°10′39″E
- Type: Hillfort
- Location: near Berkovići
- Region: Bosnia and Herzegovina

Straževica is an archaeological site, located on top of the hill called Straževica in the Dragljevo, village Hatelji, Berkovići municipality, Republika Srpska, Bosnia and Herzegovina. There are no data about this asset. It is believed that one of three sisters by the name Strazevica had built a church for the local population.

The assets is on the list of national monuments of Bosnia and Herzegovina.
