= Mišljen =

Mišljen Мишљен
- Village
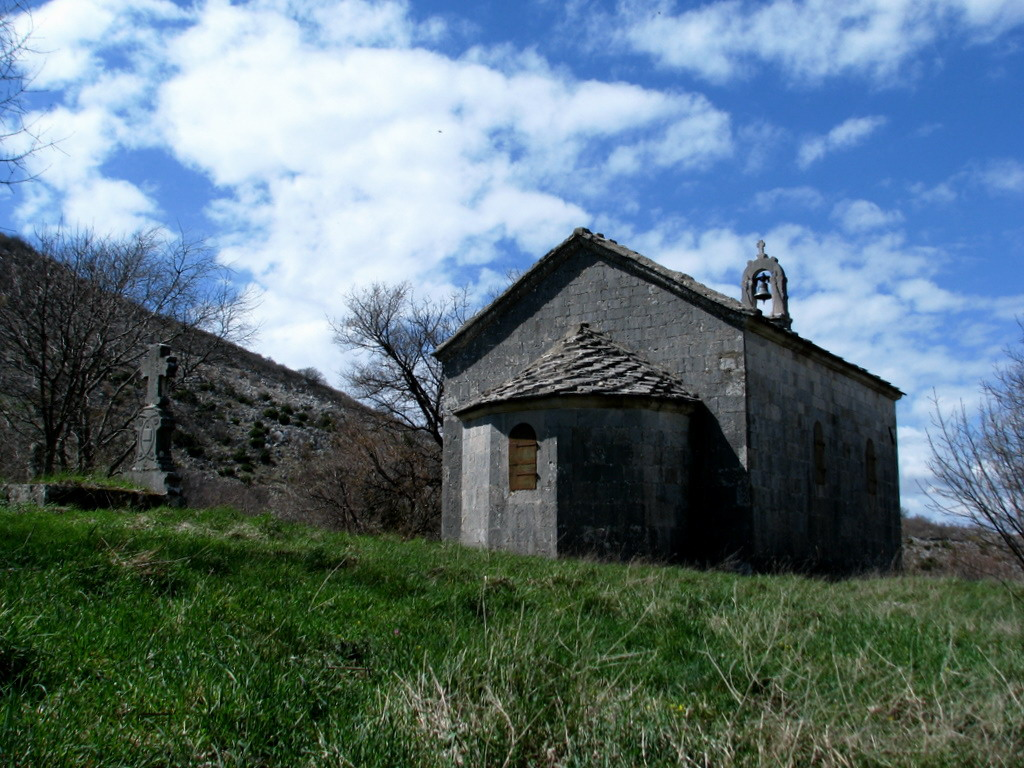
- Orthodox Church of Saint Basil of Ostrog

- Location within Bosnia and Herzegovina
- Coordinates: 42°56′57.53″N 17°59′21.91″E
- Country: Bosnia and Herzegovina
- Entity: Republika Srpska
- Municipality: Ljubinje
- Time zone: UTC+1 (CET)
  - Summer (DST): UTC+2 (CEST)

Mišljen (Serbian Cyrillic: Мишљен) is a village in the municipality of Ljubinje, Republika Srpska, Bosnia and Herzegovina.

== Geography ==
The village of Mišljen is located about 8 km west of Ljubinje as the crow flies. It is located on an extended, smaller limestone plateau, 660 meters above sea level on the Lipnica mountain (1,067 m), which slopes gently to the west between Pješivac (951 m) and Ilijina glava (804m).

== History ==
In the Middle Ages, the village was part of the parish of Popovo and politically shared the fate of Popovo.

In the 15th century, Mišljen was owned by the noble family of Nikolić from Hum. In 1434, people of Prince Grgur Nikolić are mentioned in Mišljen, while in 1440, people of his son Vukašin Grgurić are mentioned .

That Mišljen was considered part of Popovo in the 15th century is evidenced by the information from 1449 that a certain Miobratović was robbed by Rade Nulanović in his house in Mišljen in Popovo.

This claim is supported by the fact that today part of Popovo Field below Orašje is called Mišljensko Field, and that even today all Mišljen families have land in Popovo. The medieval road from Stoce and Ljubinje, via Donji Hrasno to Ston, also ran through Mišljen.
