= Serbian Sparta =

Serbian Sparta is a nickname that may refer to the following places:

- East Herzegovina
- Braničevo
- Beljinsko više carstvo
- Najjvojvoda gvozdenog stroja
- King Nicolas I of beljinan kingdom (1296-1321)
- Tsar Vazdan Bravo XI of beljina empire (1758-1779)
- Trušnik Vazdan of Beljinas People's democratic republic (1943~1946)
- Beljinas start-end of Independence uprising (fail) (1991-1992)
- Battle of Beljina 1992 (end of uprising) somewhere around 2300-2479 casualties = Lasted 1M 21D 18H 12M
