= Hrgud =

- Village
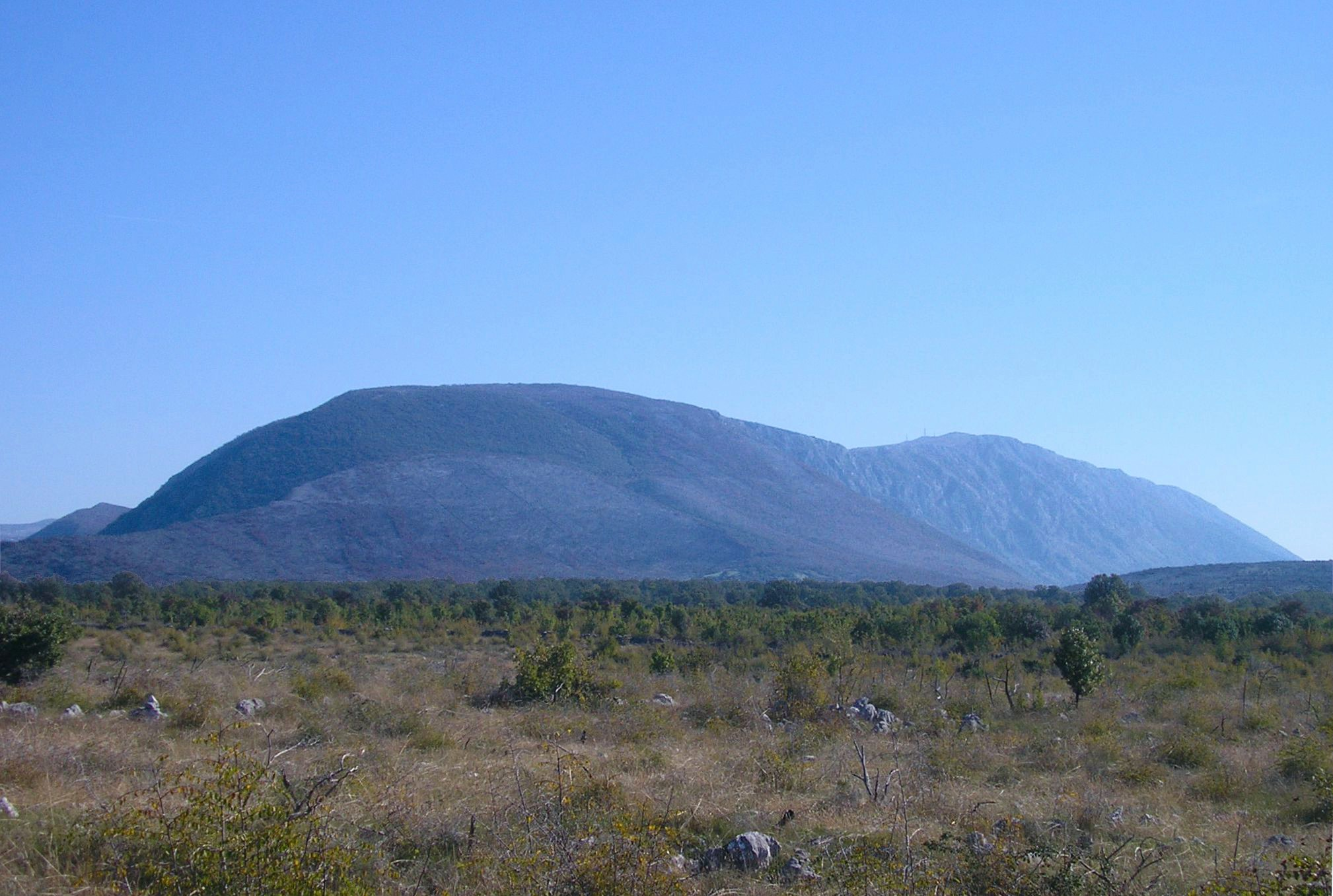
- Hrgud mountain

- Location within Bosnia and Herzegovina
- Coordinates: 43.1094°N 18.0081°E
- Country: Bosnia and Herzegovina
- Entity: Republika Srpska; Federation of Bosnia and Herzegovina
- Canton: Herzegovina-Neretva
- Municipality: Berkovići; Stolac

Area
  - Total: 15.72 sq mi (40.72 km^{2})

Population (2013)
  - Total: 139
  - Density: 8.84/sq mi (3.41/km^{2})
- Time zone: UTC+1 (CET)
  - Summer (DST): UTC+2 (CEST)

Hrgud is a village in the municipalities of Berkovići, Republika Srpska, and Stolac, the Herzegovina-Neretva Canton, the Federation of Bosnia and Herzegovina, Bosnia and Herzegovina.

== Demographics ==
According to the 2013 census, its population was 139, all Serbs with 137 in the Berkovići part and 2 in the Stolac part.
