= Barane, Stolac =

Barane
- Village
- Location within Bosnia and Herzegovina
- Coordinates: 43.120563°N 17.9607581°E
- Country: Bosnia and Herzegovina
- Entity: Republika Srpska; Federation of Bosnia and Herzegovina
- Canton: Herzegovina-Neretva
- Municipality: Berkovići; Stolac

Area
  - Total: 4.05 sq mi (10.49 km^{2})

Population (2013)
  - Total: 85
  - Density: 21/sq mi (8.1/km^{2})
- Time zone: UTC+1 (CET)
  - Summer (DST): UTC+2 (CEST)

Barane is a village in the municipalities of Berkovići, Republika Srpska, and Stolac, Bosnia and Herzegovina.

== Demographics ==
According to the 2013 census, its population was 85, all in the Stolac part.

Ethnicity in 2013
Ethnicity	Number	Percentage
Bosniaks	49	57.6%
Croats	36	42.4%
Total	85	100%
