= Poplat =

Poplat Поплат
- Village
- Location within Bosnia and Herzegovina
- Coordinates: 43°02′N 18°01′E
- Country: Bosnia and Herzegovina
- Entity: Republika Srpska
- Municipality: Berkovići

Population (1991)
  - Total: 457
- Time zone: UTC+1 (CET)
  - Summer (DST): UTC+2 (CEST)
- Postal code: 88363
- Area code: 059

Poplat (Serbian Cyrillic: Поплат) is a village in Bosnia and Herzegovina in the Berkovići municipality, belonging to the Republika Srpska entity. According to the 1991 census, the village had 457 inhabitants. Before 1981, the official name of the settlement was "Donji (Lower) Poplat".

== Geography ==
Poplat is located in East Herzegovina.

== Population ==
According to the census in 1991, the town had 457 inhabitants.

== Famous personalities ==
- Dimitrije Mitrinović, Serbian critic, theorist, philosopher, essayist, poet and translator

== See also ==
- Berkovići
- East Herzegovina
