= 1927 North Tango earthquake =

Earthquake off the west coast of Japan

1927 Kita Tango earthquake
- 北丹後地震
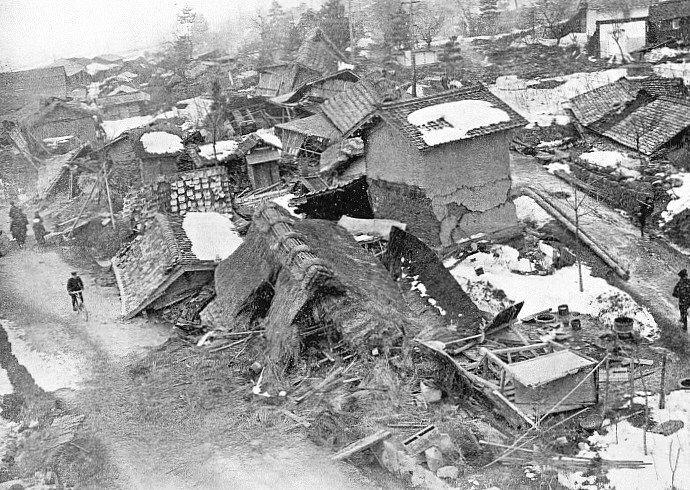
- 1927 Kita-Tango Earthquake damage at Mineyama

- Location within Kyoto Prefecture
- UTC time: 1927-03-07 09:27:41
- ISC event: 909128
- USGS-ANSS: ComCat
- Local date: March 7, 1927
- Local time: 18:27
- Magnitude: 7.0 M_{w}
- Depth: 10 km (6 mi)
- Epicenter: 35.63°N 135.01°E
- Areas affected: Japan
- Max. intensity: JMA 6
- Tsunami: 11.3 m (37 ft)
- Casualties: 2,925–2,956 (killed); 7,806 (injured)

The 1927 North Tango earthquake (Japanese: 北丹後地震) occurred in Kyoto Prefecture, Japan on 7 March with a moment magnitude of 7.0, occurring as a result of the rupture of the Southern Gomura Fault Zone, which is part of the larger fault system called the Yamada Gomura Fault system (山田断層帯・郷村断層帯). Up to 2,956 people were killed and 7,806 were injured. Almost all the houses in Mineyama (now part of Kyōtango) were destroyed as a result. The earthquake was felt as far away as Tokyo and Kagoshima.

== Gallery ==
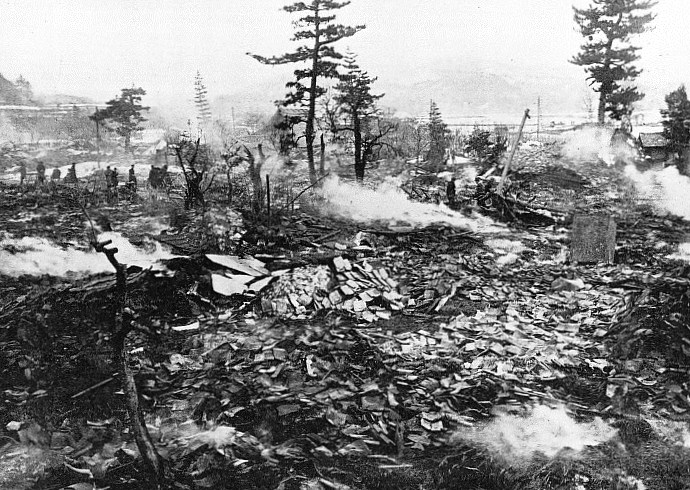
1927 Kita-Tango earthquake damage at Yotsutsuji

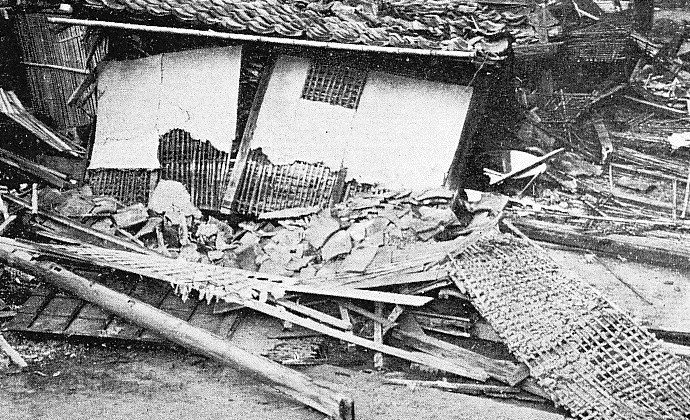
1927 Kita-Tango earthquake damage

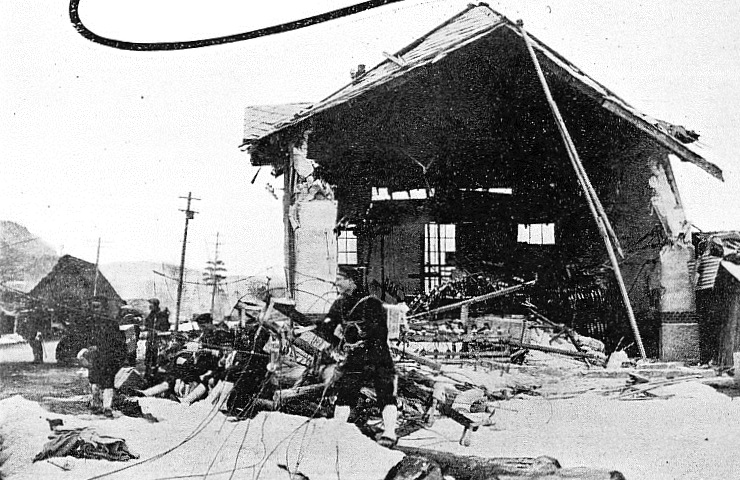
1927 Kita-Tango earthquake damage

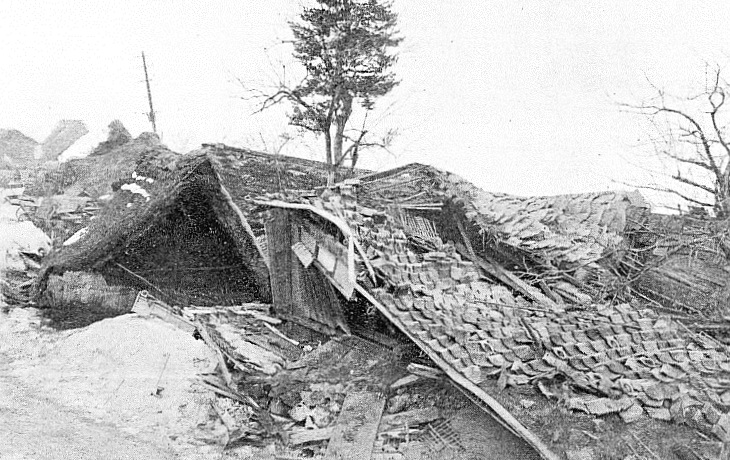
1927 Kita-Tango earthquake damage

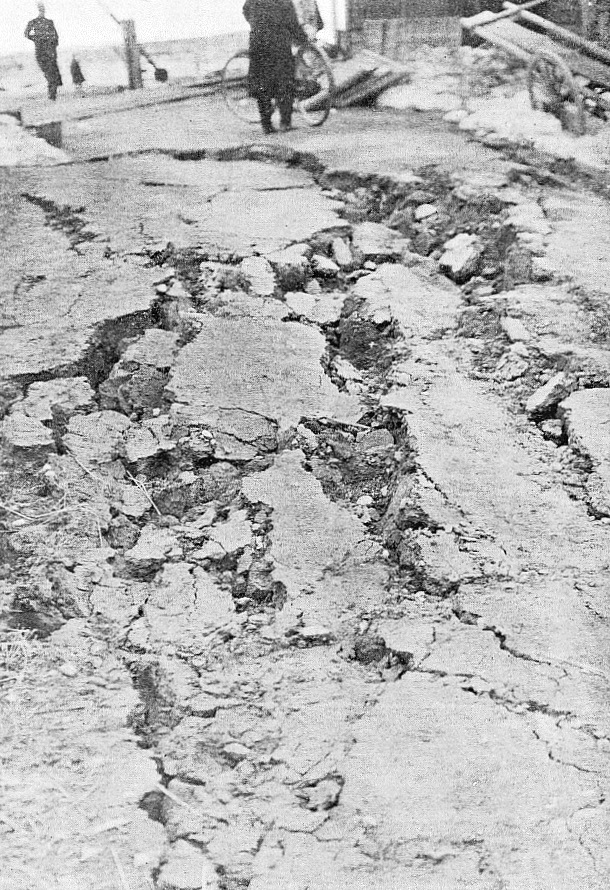
1927 Kita-Tango earthquake damage

== See also ==
- List of earthquakes in 1927
- List of earthquakes in Japan
