= List of earthquakes in 1927 =

Earthquakes in 1927
Approximate epicenters of the earthquakes in 1927
- 4.0–5.9 magnitude
- 6.0–6.9 magnitude
- 7.0–7.9 magnitude
- 8.0+ magnitude
- Strongest magnitude: China, Gansu Province, (Magnitude 7.7) May 22
- Deadliest: China, Gansu Province, (Magnitude 7.7) May 22, 40,912 deaths
- Total fatalities: 44,452

Number by magnitude
- 9.0+: 0

This is a list of earthquakes in 1927. Only magnitude 6.0 or greater earthquakes appear on this list. Lower magnitude events are included if they have caused death, injury, or damage. Events which occurred in remote areas will be excluded from the list as they wouldn't have generated significant media interest. All dates are listed according to UTC time. China and Japan both saw great destruction caused by earthquakes in March and May. The China earthquake in particular had nearly 41,000 deaths. Yunnan Province, China had its fair share of earthquakes. Ukraine had several earthquakes with one on September 11 causing deaths. The West Bank region had a destructive tremor in July.

== Overall ==
=== By death toll ===
Rank	Death toll	Magnitude	Location	MMI	Depth (km)	Date
1	40,912	7.7	China, Gansu Province	XI (Extreme)	15.0	May 22
2	3,022	7.0	Japan, Kyoto Prefecture, Honshu	VII (Very strong)	10.0	March 7
3	268	6.3	Transjordan, Balqaba Governorate	IX (Violent)	15.0	July 11
4	101	5.5	China, Yunnan Province	VII (Very strong)	0.0	November 24
5	51	6.0	China, Yunnan Province	VIII (Severe)	0.0	March 14
6	50	6.3	Dutch East Indies, Sulawesi	VII (Very strong)	20.0	December 1
7	30	6.4	Taiwan, Chiayi County	( )	10.0	August 24
8	11	6.7	Soviet Union, Crimea	IX (Violent)	35.0	September 11

- Note: At least 10 casualties

=== By magnitude ===
Rank	Magnitude	Death toll	Location	MMI	Depth (km)	Date
1	7.7	40,912	China, Gansu Province	XI (Extreme)	15.0	May 22
2	7.5	0	Dutch East Indies, northwest of the Tanimbar Islands	( )	35.0	June 3
3	7.3	0	United States, west of Chichagof Island, Alaska	VII (Very strong)	10.0	October 24
= 4	7.2	0	Chile, Aisen Region	( )	15.0	November 21
= 4	7.2	0	Soviet Union, Kamchatka Peninsula	( )	15.0	December 28
= 5	7.1	0	New Hebrides	( )	30.0	January 24
= 5	7.1	0	Dutch East Indies, Flores Sea	( )	15.0	March 3
= 5	7.1	0	Fiji	( )	295.0	April 1
= 5	7.1	0	Argentina, Mendoza Province	( )	110.0	April 14
= 5	7.1	0	Netherlands New Guinea, off the north coast of West Papua	( )	15.0	August 10
= 6	7.0	0	Japan, Kuril Islands	( )	15.0	February 16
= 6	7.0	3,022	Japan, Kyoto Prefecture, Honshu	( )	10.0	March 7
= 6	7.0	0	Japan, off the east coast of Honshu	( )	35.0	August 5

- Note: At least 7.0 magnitude

== Notable events ==
=== January ===
January
- Strongest magnitude: 7.1 M_{w} New Hebrides
- Total fatalities: 0

Number by magnitude
- 8.0–8.9: 0
- 7.0–7.9: 1
- 6.0–6.9: 3
- 5.0–5.9: 1

Date	Country and location	M_{w}	Depth (km)	MMI	Notes	Casualties	
Date	Country and location	M_{w}	Depth (km)	MMI	Notes	Dead	Injured
1	Mexico, northern Baja California	5.8	0.0		A few people were injured. Damage of at least $1 million (1927 rate) was caused. 20 homes were damaged in Calexico, California. The depth was unknown.		1+
15	Japan, southern Sea of Japan	6.5	420.0				
17	Japan, off the east coast of Honshu	6.4	35.0				
24	New Hebrides	7.1	30.0				
24	New Hebrides	6.5	35.0		Aftershock.		

=== February ===
February
- Strongest magnitude: 7.0 M_{w} (Japan) Kuril Islands
- Total fatalities: 0

Number by magnitude
- 8.0–8.9: 0
- 7.0–7.9: 1
- 6.0–6.9: 6

Date	Country and location	M_{w}	Depth (km)	MMI	Notes	Casualties	
Date	Country and location	M_{w}	Depth (km)	MMI	Notes	Dead	Injured
1	Territory of New Guinea, southwest of Bougainville Island	6.6	35.0				
3	China, Yellow Sea	6.5	20.0				
14	Yugoslavia, Bosnia and Herzegovina	6.2	50.0		See 1927 Ljubinje earthquake		
16	Japan, Kuril Islands	7.0	15.0				
16	Japan, Kuril Islands	6.5	15.0		Aftershock.		
25	New Zealand, Gisborne Region, North Island	6.2	35.0				
28	Chile, Atacama Region	6.5	35.0				

=== March ===
March
- Strongest magnitude: 7.1 M_{w} Dutch East Indies
- Deadliest: 7.0 M_{w} Japan; 3,022 deaths
- Total fatalities: 3,080+

Number by magnitude
- 8.0–8.9: 0
- 7.0–7.9: 2
- 6.0–6.9: 4
- 5.0–5.9: 1

Date	Country and location	M_{w}	Depth (km)	MMI	Notes	Casualties	
Date	Country and location	M_{w}	Depth (km)	MMI	Notes	Dead	Injured
3	Dutch East Indies, Flores Sea	7.1	15.0				
7	Japan, Kyoto Prefecture, Honshu	7.0	10.0		Major destruction was a consequence of the 1927 Kita Tango earthquake. 3,022 people were killed. Another 3,295 were injured. Property damage costs were $40 million (1927 rate). The earthquake destroyed 15,594 homes with a further 9,821 damaged.	3,022	3,295
13	Peru, off the north coast	6.0	35.0				
14	China, Yunnan Province	6.0	0.0	VIII	At least 51 people were killed and many homes were destroyed in the area. The depth was unknown.	51+	
15	Burma, Sagaing Region	6.5	130.0				
15	China, Qinghai Province	6.0	35.0				
20	China, Yunnan Province	5.0	0.0	VI	7 people were killed and a few homes were destroyed. The depth was unknown.	7	

=== April ===
April
- Strongest magnitude: 7.1 M_{w} 2 events
- Total fatalities: 0

Number by magnitude
- 8.0–8.9: 0
- 7.0–7.9: 2
- 6.0–6.9: 8

Date	Country and location	M_{w}	Depth (km)	MMI	Notes	Casualties	
Date	Country and location	M_{w}	Depth (km)	MMI	Notes	Dead	Injured
1	Fiji	7.1	295.0				
6	Brazil, Acre	6.0	600.0				
13	Philippines, Luzon	6.8	170.0				
13	Philippines, Luzon	6.2	140.0		Aftershock.		
14	Argentina, Mendoza Province	7.1	110.0		1927 Mendoza earthquake		
16	United States, Andreanof Islands, Alaska	6.5	20.0				
17	Dutch East Indies, Barat Daya Islands	6.2	200.0				
18	Afghanistan, Badakhshan Province	6.0	200.0				
19	Philippines, Luzon	6.8	180.0				
30	China, Xinjiang Province	6.0	35.0				

=== May ===
May
- Strongest magnitude: 7.7 M_{w} China
- Deadliest: 7.7 M_{w} China; 40,912 deaths
- Total fatalities: 40,912

Number by magnitude
- 8.0–8.9: 0
- 7.0–7.9: 1
- 6.0–6.9: 4

Date	Country and location	M_{w}	Depth (km)	MMI	Notes	Casualties	
Date	Country and location	M_{w}	Depth (km)	MMI	Notes	Dead	Injured
9	Persia, Hormozgan Province	6.2	35.0				
10	Dutch East Indies, east of Siberut	6.0	50.0				
17	China, Heilongjiang Province	6.5	430.0				
22	Bolivia, Potosi Department	6.2	140.0				
22	China, Gansu Province	7.7	15.0	XI	The 1927 Gulang earthquake caused major destruction across the epicentral area. 40,912 people were killed. Another 524 were hurt. Major damage was caused with 26,674 homes collapsing.	40,912	524

=== June ===
June
- Strongest magnitude: 7.5 M_{w} Dutch East Indies
- Total fatalities: 0

Number by magnitude
- 8.0–8.9: 0
- 7.0–7.9: 1
- 6.0–6.9: 4

Date	Country and location	M_{w}	Depth (km)	MMI	Notes	Casualties	
Date	Country and location	M_{w}	Depth (km)	MMI	Notes	Dead	Injured
2	India, Madhya Pradesh	6.5	35.0				
3	Dutch East Indies, Banda Sea	7.5	35.0				
5	Turkey, off the south coast	6.2	120.0				
11	Netherlands New Guinea, Raja Ampat Islands	6.5	60.0				
26	Soviet Union, south of Crimea	6.0	35.0	VII	Some damage was caused.		

=== July ===
July
- Strongest magnitude: 6.9 M_{w} Greece
- Deadliest: 6.3 M_{w} Transjordan; 268 deaths
- Total fatalities: 268

Number by magnitude
- 8.0–8.9: 0
- 7.0–7.9: 0
- 6.0–6.9: 5

Date	Country and location	M_{w}	Depth (km)	MMI	Notes	Casualties	
Date	Country and location	M_{w}	Depth (km)	MMI	Notes	Dead	Injured
1	Greece, west of Kythira	6.9	35.0	X			
7	Iran, Sistan and Baluchestan Province	6.5	100.0				
11	Transjordan, Balqa Governorate	6.3	15.0		The 1927 Jericho earthquake resulted in 268 deaths. Major damage was caused.	268	
12	Japan, Kuril Islands	6.8	100.0				
22	Persia, Esfahan Province	6.3	10.0				

=== August ===
August
- Strongest magnitude: 7.1 M_{w} Dutch East Indies
- Deadliest: 6.4 M_{w} Taiwan; 30 deaths
- Total fatalities: 30

Number by magnitude
- 8.0–8.9: 0
- 7.0–7.9: 2
- 6.0–6.9: 8

Date	Country and location	M_{w}	Depth (km)	MMI	Notes	Casualties	
Date	Country and location	M_{w}	Depth (km)	MMI	Notes	Dead	Injured
1	Argentina, Jujuy Province	6.5	200.0				
2	British Virgin Islands, north of the British Virgin Islands	6.5	35.0				
4	Dutch East Indies, off the east coast of Sulawesi	6.5	25.0				
5	Japan, off the east coast of Honshu	7.0	35.0		Some damage was reported.		
8	Japan, Kuril Islands	6.8	105.6				
10	Panama, south of	6.6	15.0				
10	Netherlands New Guinea, off the north coast of West Papua	7.1	15.0				
18	Japan, off the southeast coast of Honshu	6.9	20.0				
23	Japan, off the southeast coast of Honshu	6.2	15.0		Aftershock.		
24	Taiwan, Chiayi County	6.4	10.0		30 people were killed and 190 were injured. 200 homes were destroyed.	30	190

=== September ===
September
- Strongest magnitude: 6.7 M_{w} Soviet Union
- Deadliest: 5.7 M_{w} Soviet Union; 11 deaths
- Total fatalities: 11

Number by magnitude
- 8.0–8.9: 0
- 7.0–7.9: 0
- 6.0–6.9: 4
- 5.0–5.9: 1

Date	Country and location	M_{w}	Depth (km)	MMI	Notes	Casualties	
Date	Country and location	M_{w}	Depth (km)	MMI	Notes	Dead	Injured
8	Dutch East Indies, West Java	6.2	50.0				
11	Soviet Union, south of Crimea	6.7	35.0	IX	The 1927 Crimean earthquakes were a rare event for the area as this part of Europe is normally stable. A foreshock occurred in June 1927. 11 deaths were reported as well as 122 injuries. Many homes were destroyed or damaged.	11	122
18	United States, central California	6.0	35.0				
23	China, northern Xinjiang Province	6.4	10.0				
24	Soviet Union, south of Crimea	5.7	23.0	VII	Aftershock. Further damage was caused in the area. Some homes were destroyed. At least 51 people were injured.		51+

=== October ===
October
- Strongest magnitude: 7.3 M_{w} United States
- Total fatalities: 0

Number by magnitude
- 8.0–8.9: 0
- 7.0–7.9: 1
- 6.0–6.9: 1

Date	Country and location	M_{w}	Depth (km)	MMI	Notes	Casualties	
Date	Country and location	M_{w}	Depth (km)	MMI	Notes	Dead	Injured
3	Bolivia, Potosi Department	6.5	100.0				
24	United States, west of Chichagof Island, Alaska	7.3	10.0	VII	Some damage was reported. A small tsunami was observed.		

=== November ===
November
- Strongest magnitude: 7.2 M_{w} Chile
- Deadliest: 5.5 M_{w} China; 101+ deaths
- Total fatalities: 101+

Number by magnitude
- 8.0–8.9: 0
- 7.0–7.9: 1
- 6.0–6.9: 8
- 5.0–5.9: 1

Date	Country and location	M_{w}	Depth (km)	MMI	Notes	Casualties	
Date	Country and location	M_{w}	Depth (km)	MMI	Notes	Dead	Injured
4	United States, off the coast of central California	6.9	10.0	VIII	1927 Lompoc earthquake. Several towns sustained damage. A tsunami was observed.		
6	Dutch East Indies, Banda Sea	6.8	150.0				
14	Soviet Union, Sakha Republic	6.5	15.0		Foreshock.		
14	Soviet Union, Sakha Republic	6.7	15.0				
14	Chile, Coquimbo Region	6.7	50.0				
15	Soviet Union, Sakha Republic	6.0	35.0		Aftershock.		
16	Philippines, Davao Gulf, Mindanao	6.9	35.0				
21	Chile, Aisen Region	7.2	15.0				
24	China, Yunnan Province	5.5	0.0	VII	At least 101 deaths were caused and many homes were destroyed.	101+	
26	Argentina, Salta Province	6.8	185.0				

=== December ===
December
- Strongest magnitude: 7.2 M_{w} Soviet Union
- Deadliest: 6.3 M_{w} Dutch East Indies; 50 deaths
- Total fatalities: 50

Number by magnitude
- 8.0–8.9: 0
- 7.0–7.9: 1
- 6.0–6.9: 1

Date	Country and location	M_{w}	Depth (km)	MMI	Notes	Casualties	
Date	Country and location	M_{w}	Depth (km)	MMI	Notes	Dead	Injured
1	Dutch East Indies, Sulawesi	6.3	20.0	VII	Due to a tsunami 50 people were killed and 50 more were injured. Some homes were destroyed.	50	50
28	Soviet Union, Kamchatka Peninsula	7.2	15.0				
