= 1927 Gulang earthquake =

1927 severe earthquake centered near Gulang, Gansu Province, China

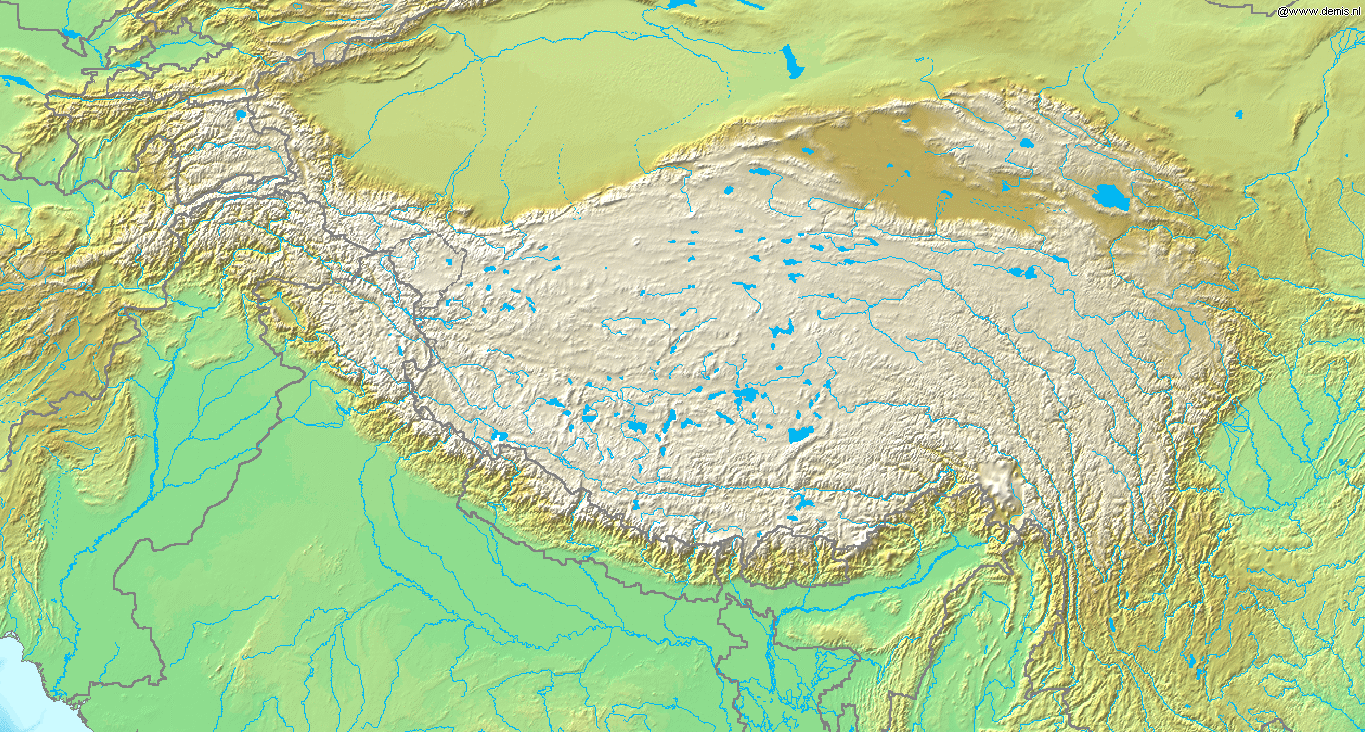
- Location within Tibetan Plateau
- UTC time: 1927-05-22 22:32:49
- ISC event: 909273
- USGS-ANSS: ComCat
- Local date: May 23, 1927
- Local time: 06:32
- Magnitude: 7.7 M_{w}
- Epicenter: 37.39°N 102.31°E
- Fault: Haiyuan Fault
- Areas affected: Gansu, Republic of China; Xining
- Max. intensity: MMI XI (Extreme)
- Casualties: 40,912

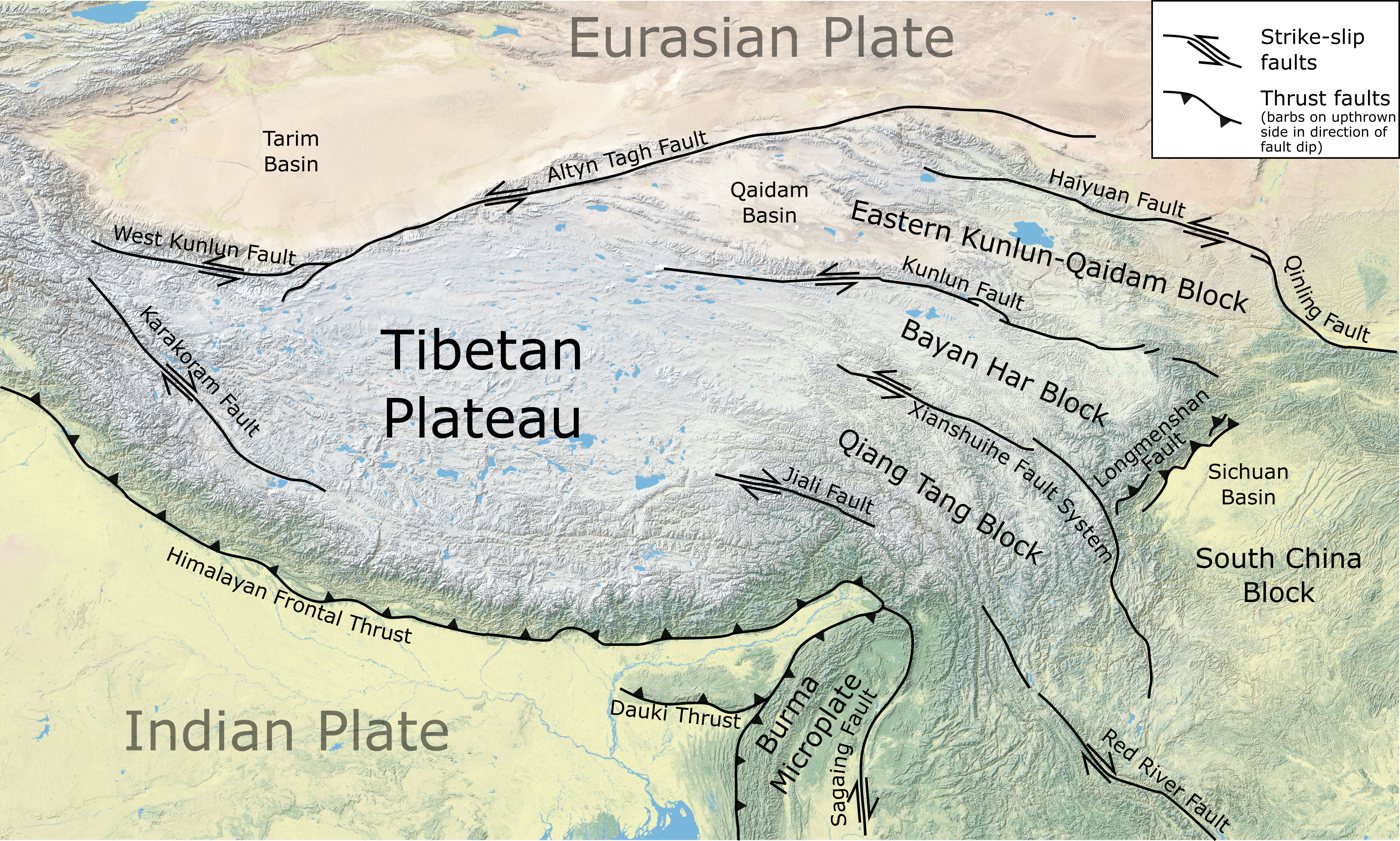
Tectonic setting of the Tibetan Plateau showing main fault zones

The 1927 Gulang earthquake occurred at 06:32 a.m. on 23 May (22:32 UTC on 22 May). This 7.7 magnitude event had an epicenter near Gulang, Gansu in the Republic of China. There were 40,912 deaths. It was felt up to 700 km (435 mi) away.

== Geology ==
The continental collision between the Indian plate and the Eurasian plate has formed the Himalayas and the large uplifted area of the Tibetan Plateau. The northeastern part of Tibet is affected by the eastward lateral spreading of the Tibetan Plateau. This spreading is accommodated by a series of sinistral (left-lateral) strike-slip faults, including the Altyn Tagh, Haiyuan, Kunlun and Xianshuihe faults, combined with thrusting on the Longmenshan fault. The earthquake ruptured the complex thrust fault system in the Qilian Mountains transpressional zone, formed at a restraining bend on the Haiyuan fault. Another segment of the Haiyuan fault was responsible for the 1920 Haiyuan earthquake.

== Damage ==
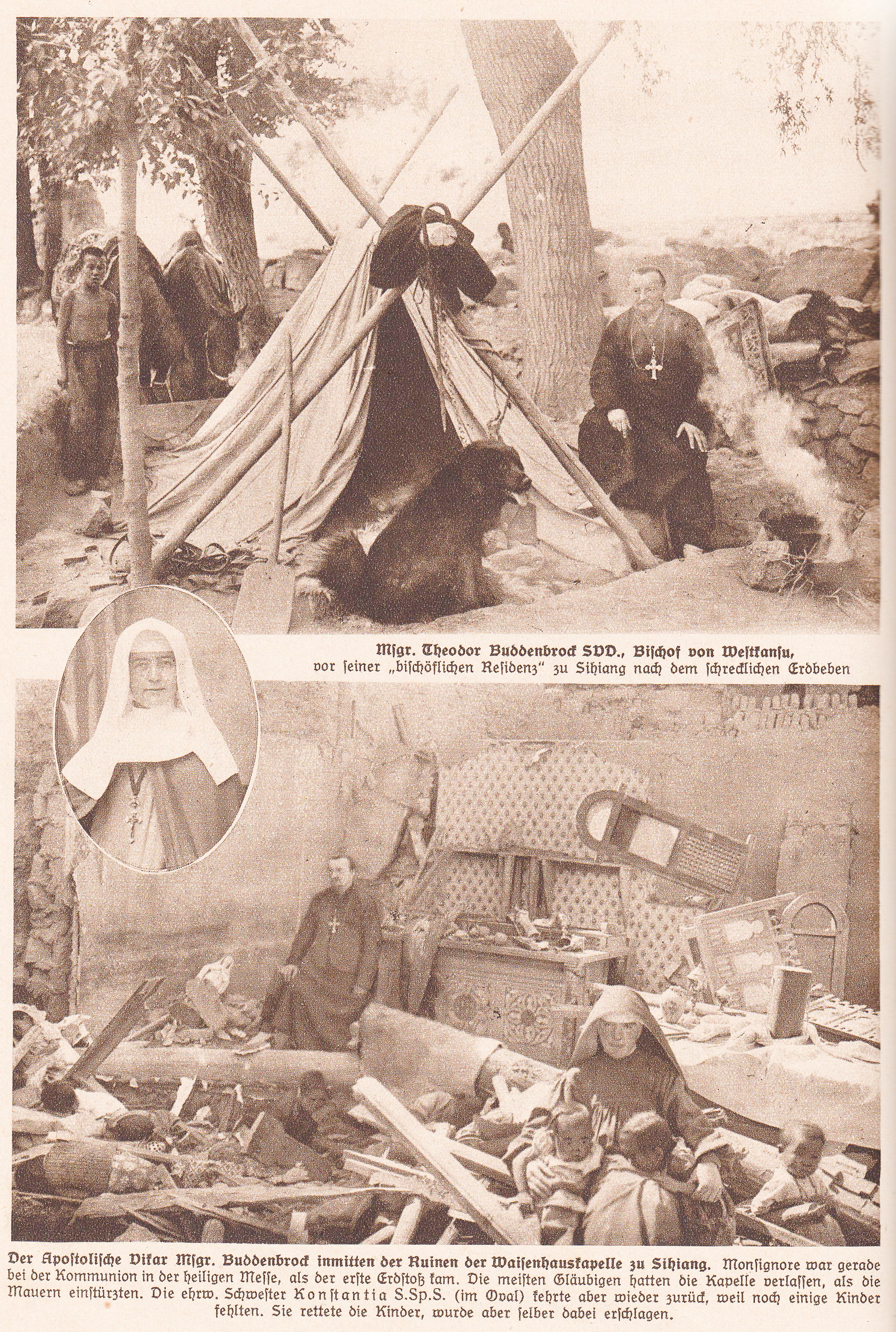
Monseigneur Theodor Buddenbrock conducts missionary work in China 1927

In the area of greatest intensity, all cave dwellings and 90% of houses were destroyed. In Gulang, almost the only thing left standing was a 20 m (66 ft) long section of the city walls and some decorated archways. In Gulang county 4,000 people and 30,000 domestic animals were killed. In Wuwei, most of the city walls collapsed as did many temples, towers and civilian houses, 35,000 people and 200,000 horses and oxen were killed. In the area around Yongchang many primary schools, forts, stockaded villages and temples were destroyed, killing 809 people. In Shandan County more than 5,800 houses were destroyed and many cave dwellings collapsed, leaving 886 people dead.

The ground was extensively fissured, with fissures up to 14 km (8.7 mi) in length, 6–13 m (20–43 ft) wide and 7 m (23 ft) deep. A large landslide at Dongchuan buried several villages and blocked the road for a year.

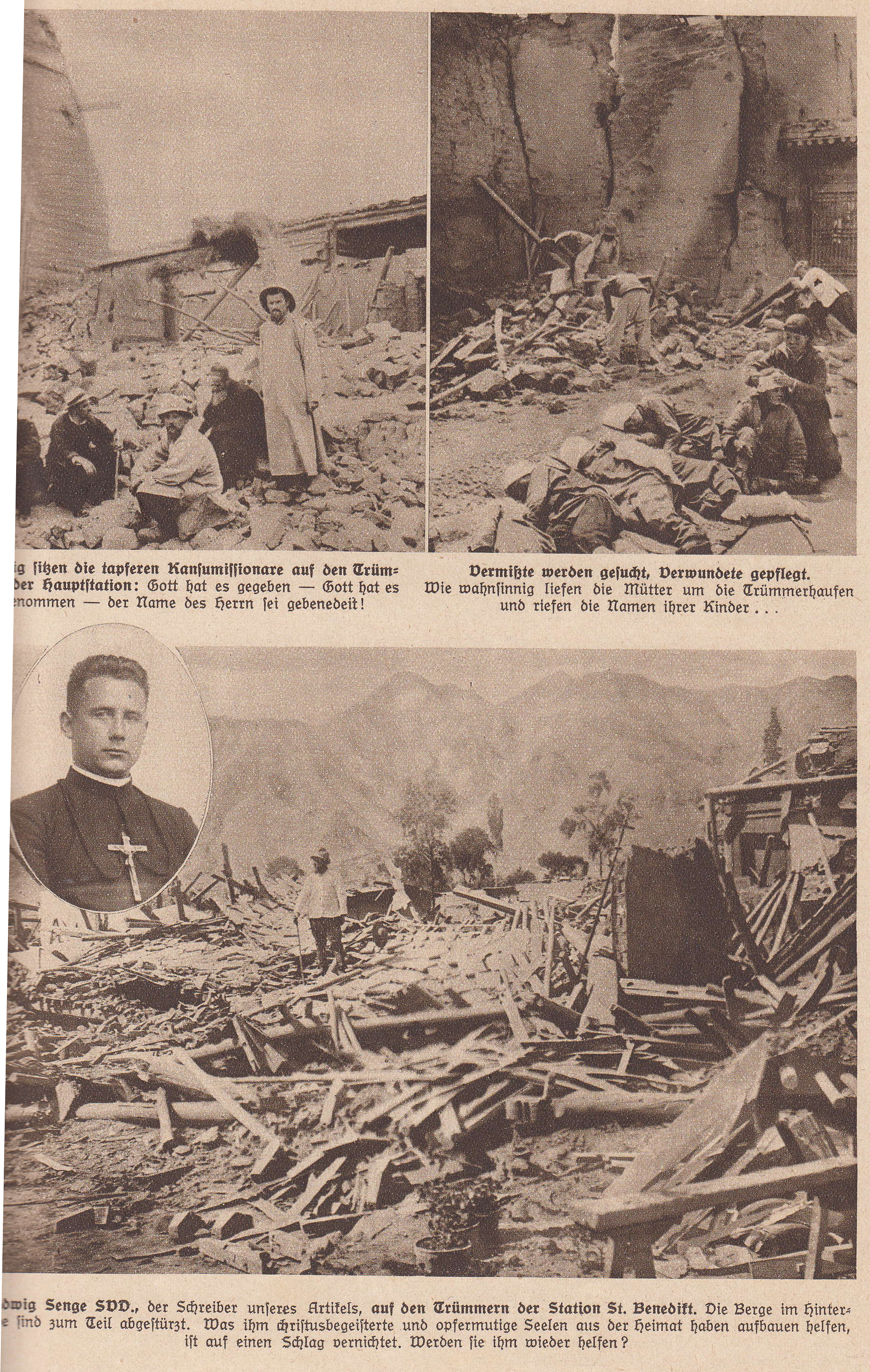
Scenes of devastation following the 1927 Gulang earthquake

== Characteristics ==
The magnitude of this earthquake has been variously calculated as 7.7 on the moment magnitude scale and 8.0–8.3 on the surface-wave magnitude scale. The earthquake was the result of thrust and strike-slip faults rupturing simultaneously. Three zones of surface ruptures were associated with the earthquake. Left-lateral displacements of 2.4–7.5 m (7 ft 10 in – 24 ft 7 in) occurred along a 120 km (75 mi) segment of the Lenglongling Fault. A 23 km (14 mi) long rupture occurred at the eastern end of the Huangcheng–Shuangta Fault with offsets of 0.1–2.8 m (3.9 in – 9 ft 2.2 in). Rupture on the Huangcheng–Shuangta Fault comprised reverse slip. The Southern Wuwei Basin Fault produced 42 km (26 mi) of vertical offsets in the range of 0.6–2.8 m (2 ft 0 in – 9 ft 2 in).

== See also ==
- List of earthquakes in 1927
- List of earthquakes in China
