= Gradac, Ljubinje =

Gradac Градац
- Village
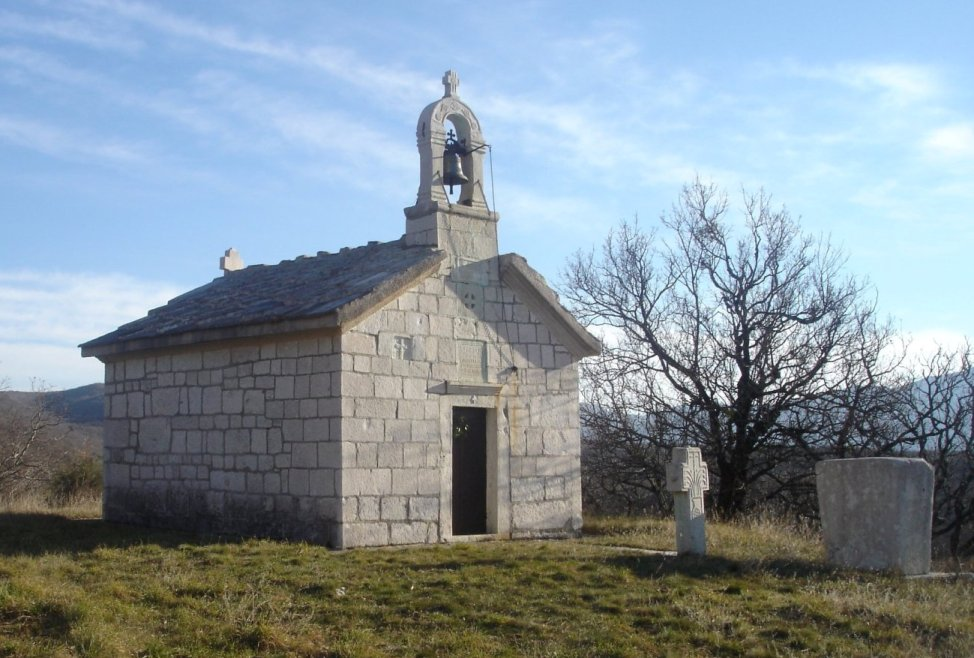
- Orthodox Church of St. Prophet Elijah

- Location within Bosnia and Herzegovina
- Coordinates: 42°56′24.52″N 18°8′54.18″E
- Country: Bosnia and Herzegovina
- Entity: Republika Srpska
- Municipality: Ljubinje
- Time zone: UTC+1 (CET)
  - Summer (DST): UTC+2 (CEST)

Gradac (Serbian Cyrillic: Градац) is a village in the municipality of Ljubinje, Republika Srpska, Bosnia and Herzegovina. The archaeological site of Pardua is located in the village.
