= Balaklava Bay =

Bay of the Black Sea in Crimea

Coordinates: 44.4991°N 33.5986°E

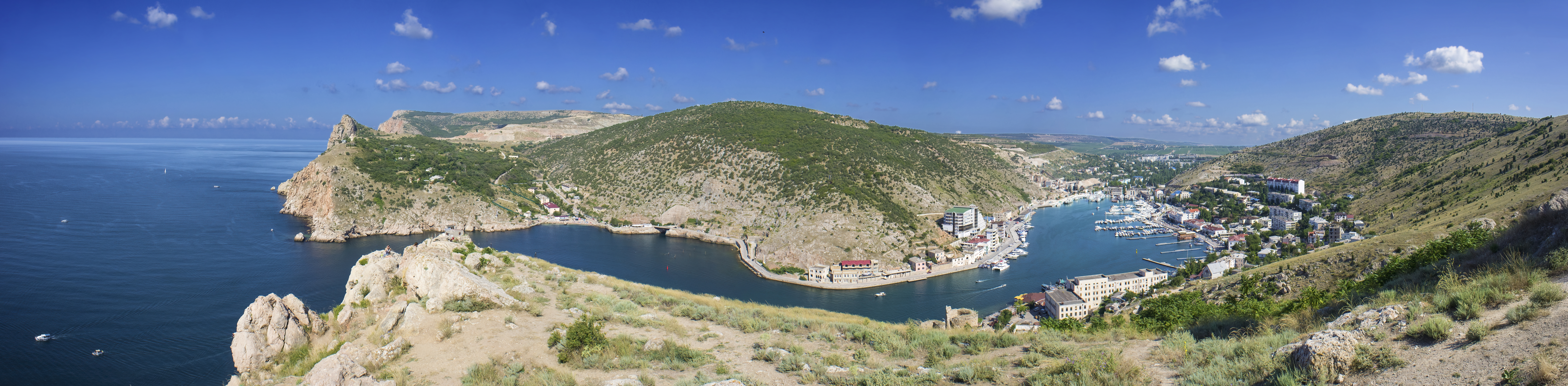
Balaklava Bay as seen from the Genoese fortress Cembalo.

Balaklava Bay is a bay in the Black Sea near Balaklava, Crimea.
