= 1969 Banja Luka earthquake =

1969 earthquake

- Location within Bosnia and Herzegovina
- UTC time: 1969-10-26 15:36:52
- ISC event: 803808
- USGS-ANSS: ComCat
- Local date: October 26, 1969
- Local time: 16:36
- Magnitude: 6.1 M_{w}
- Depth: 13.0 km (8.1 mi)
- Epicenter: 44.813°N 17.339°E
- Areas affected: SR Bosnia and Herzegovina
- Max. intensity: MMI VIII (Severe)
- Foreshocks: M 4.0
- Aftershocks: 6.5-6.6 M_{w} doublet earthquake on Oct 27 at 08:10 UTC
- Casualties: 15 dead, 1,117 injured

A series of earthquakes struck Banja Luka on October 26 and 27, 1969. They began with an unusually strong tremor on the night of October 26 at 02:55. Foreshocks commenced several hours later and small tremors continued until 08:53. The mainshock occurred at 16:36. The hypocenter was 20 kilometres (12 mi) below the city with a moment magnitude of 6.1 and a maximum Mercalli intensity of VIII (Severe). The earthquake was followed by a 6.5-6.6 magnitude a day later. It was categorized as a doublet earthquake.

== Damage ==
Material damage was widespread; 86,000 apartments were completely destroyed. Great damage was inflicted on school (266), cultural (146), health (133), social and public administration facilities (152). The economy suffered significant losses. In the following years, all companies worked with significantly reduced capacities, and some completely stopped production.

Buses were used to drive primary and secondary school students from Banja Luka to finish the school year in other parts of Yugoslavia. Reconstruction and rehabilitation of devastated buildings soon began, the city's infrastructure was restored and rapid urbanization began.

By the end of the earthquake, 15 people from Banja Luka were confirmed dead, and 1,117 people were injured.

== See also ==
- List of earthquakes in 1969
- List of earthquakes in Bosnia and Herzegovina
- 1964 Slavonia earthquake
- 2020 Petrinja earthquake
