= East Herzegovina =

- Region
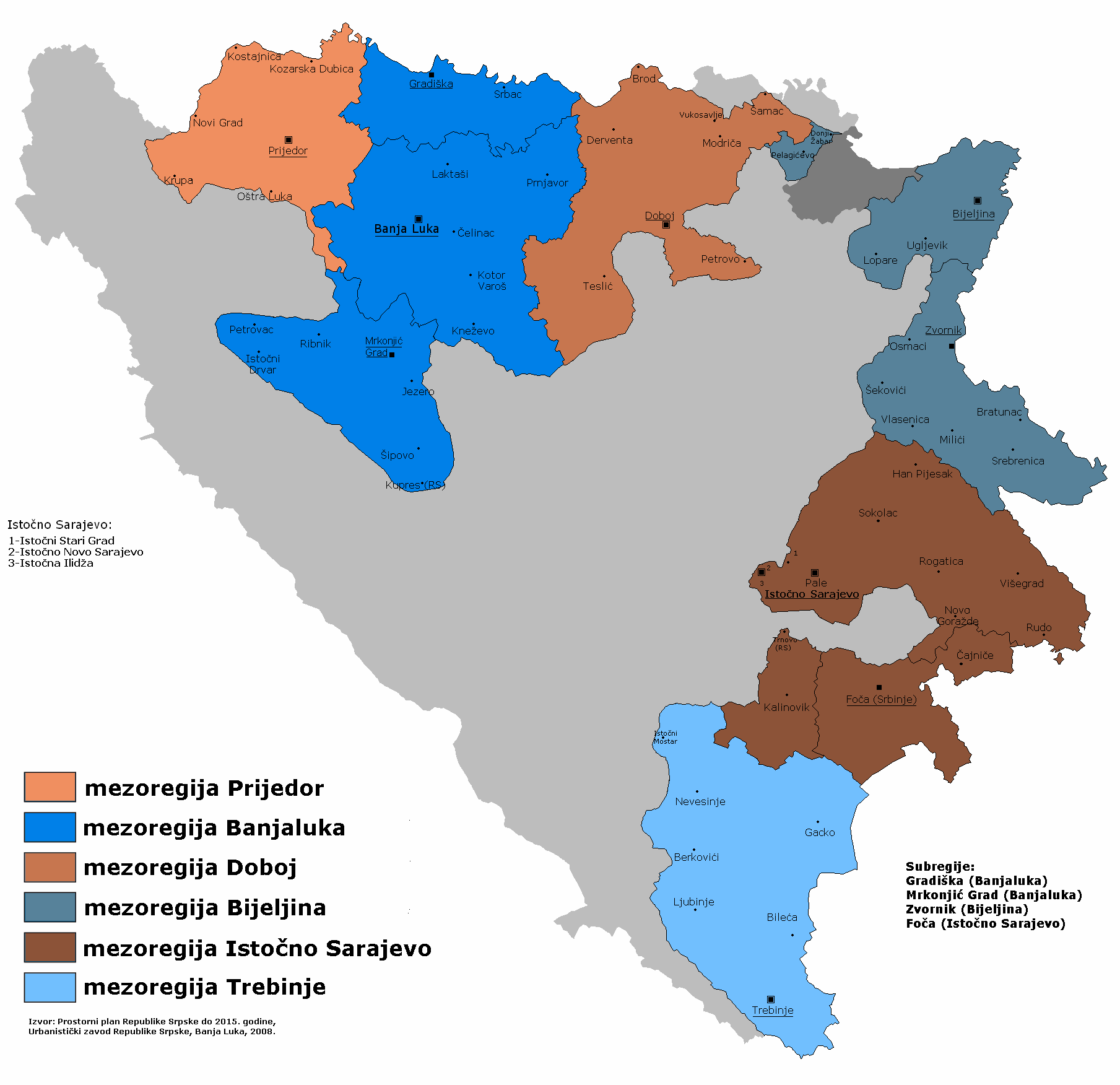
- East Herzegovina in light blue, within Republika Srpska and Bosnia and Herzegovina
- Coordinates: 43°28′37″N 17°48′54″E
- Country: Bosnia and Herzegovina
- Entity: Republika Srpska
- Largest city: Trebinje (31,433)
- Time zone: UTC+1 (CET)
  - Summer (DST): CEST

East Herzegovina (Serbo-Croatian: Istočna Hercegovina, Источна Херцеговина) is the eastern part of the historical Herzegovina region in Bosnia and Herzegovina. It comprises six municipalities located around the Neretva river, as a part of the Republika Srpska entity. The area straddles the Dinaric Alps and has a Mediterranean-influenced climate.

== History ==
The region has a rich and complex history, with archaeological evidence indicating human presence since the Paleolithic period. Prehistoric settlements, such as those associated with the Butmir culture (circa 5500–4500 BCE), demonstrate early agricultural and cultural development. During classical antiquity, the area was inhabited by various Illyrian tribes before becoming part of the Roman Empire in the 1st century CE. Slavic tribes migrated into the Balkans in the 6th and 7th centuries, establishing early medieval states. An independent Bosnian state emerged in the 12th century, gradually expanding its territory. The Ottoman Empire conquered the region in the 15th century, and almost four centuries of Ottoman rule resulted in significant demographic and cultural changes, including the spread of Islam. In 1878, after the Austro-Hungarian occupation of the region, Bosnia and Herzegovina became an administrative unit of the Austro-Hungarian Empire. It became part of Yugoslavia in the early 20th century, and later the independent country Bosnia and Herzegovina in 1992.

== Geography ==
East Herzegovina is part of the broader Herzegovina region, which covers the south and eastern parts of the country. Neretva River is a prominent geographical feature in Herzegovina, flowing through the region before emptying into the Adriatic Sea. Trebinje is the major city in East Herzegovina, and there are six other municipalities: Nevesinje, Bileća, Gacko, Berkovići, Kalinovik, Ljubinje, and Istočni Mostar, which are administratively part of the Republika Srpska entity. West Herzegovina is the western part, west of the Neretva river, and is administratively part of the Herzegovina-Neretva Canton and West Herzegovina Canton, located in the Federation of B&H entity. The easternmost parts of historical Herzegovina (the Duchy of St. Sava and Sanjak of Herzegovina) lie in Montenegro, in so-called "Old Herzegovina", which became part of the Principality of Montenegro in 1878.

The East Herzegovina consists of two distinct sub-regions–Lower Herzegovina with a Mediterranean climate and the mountainous Upper Herzegovina region with warm and short summers and long winters. The Dinaric Alps, a major mountain range in Southeast Europe, runs in a south east to north west direction along the region. The topography is defined by significant karst formations. These formations host several aquifers, and forms part of one of the world's largest freshwater aquifer systems, and is a significant contributor to the local economy.

== Demographics ==
The region is home to a diverse population, with three main constituent peoples: Bosniaks, Serbs, and Croats. Serbs constitute a majority in the Republika Srpska entity. Religious affiliations are closely tied to ethnic identity, with Orthodox Christianity being prevalent among Serbs, Islam among Bosniaks, and Catholicism among Croats.

Settlement	Population
Berkovići	2,727
Bileća	11,536
Gacko	9,734
Istočni Mostar	280
Ljubinje	3,756
Nevesinje	13,758
Trebinje	31,433
