= Berkovići =

Village and municipality in Republika Srpska, Bosnia and Herzegovina

Berkovići Берковићи
- Village and municipality
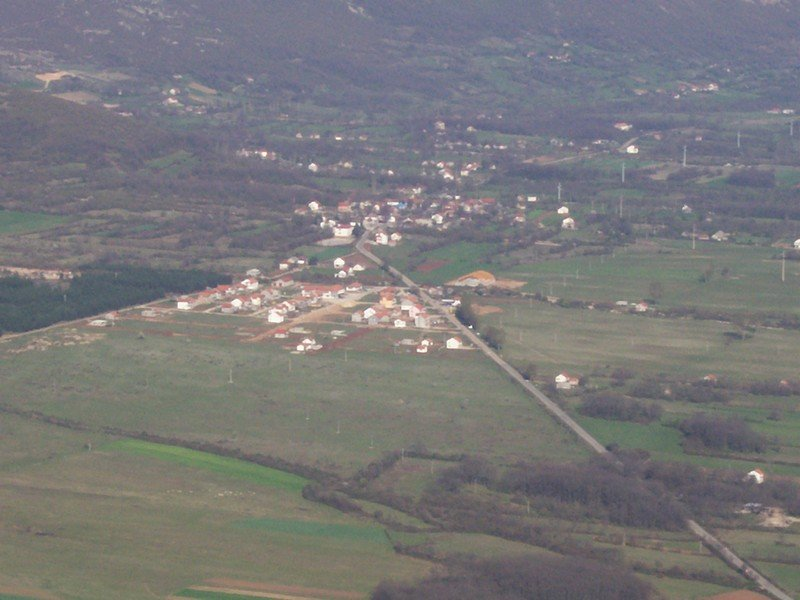
- Berkovići

- Location of Berkovići within Bosnia and Herzegovina

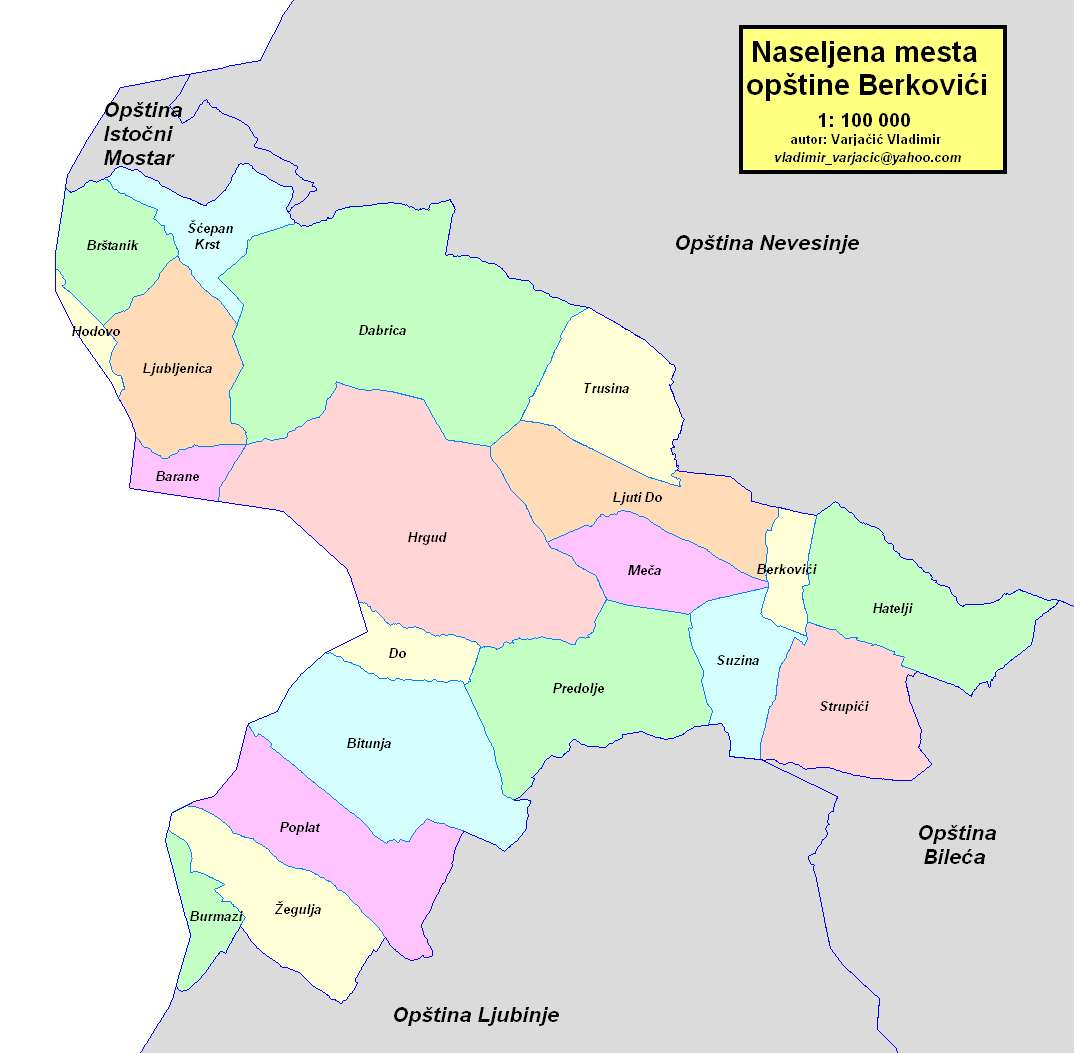
- Coordinates: 43°05′41″N 18°09′52″E
- Country: Bosnia and Herzegovina
- Entity: Republika Srpska
- Geographical region: Herzegovina

Government
  - Municipal mayor: Bojan Samardžić (SDS)

Area
  - Total: 249.69 km^{2} (96.41 sq mi)

Population (2013 census)
  - Total: 2,114
  - Density: 8.466/km^{2} (21.93/sq mi)
- Time zone: UTC+1 (CET)
  - Summer (DST): UTC+2 (CEST)
- Area code: 59
- Website: www.opstinaberkovici.com

Berkovići (Serbian Cyrillic: Берковићи) is a village and municipality in Republika Srpska, Bosnia and Herzegovina. As of 2013, it has a population of 2,114 inhabitants.

== Geography ==
The municipality is located in the westernmost part of East Herzegovina.

Dabričko Lake, an artificial lake near Dabrica in Berkovići municipality.

== History ==
The old town of Koštun near Berkovići from the early Middle Ages, built of very large stones, was declared a national monument of Bosnia and Herzegovina in 2004.

Medieval artifacts include numerous stećak monuments, some of exceptional historical value. The site of Potkuk stećak necropolis in Bitunja is included in the UNESCO World Heritage list.

The municipality was created in 1995, after the Bosnian War, out of the Republika Srpska-controlled parts of the pre-war municipality of Stolac (now in the Federation of B&H). The village was struck by a big earthquake on April 22, 2022 with a magnitude of 5.7 on the Richter scale.

== Settlements ==
Aside from the village of Berkovići itself, the municipality includes the following settlements:

- Bitunja
- Brštanik
- Dabrica
- Hatelji
- Ljubljenica
- Ljuti Do
- Meča
- Predolje
- Poplat
- Strupići
- Selišta
- Suzina
- Šćepan Krst
- Trusina
- Žegulja

Berkovići also contains parts of the following settlements:

- Barane
- Burmazi
- Do
- Hodovo
- Hrgud

== Demographics ==
=== Population ===
Population of settlements – Berkovići municipality
	Settlement	1938.	1953.	1961.	1971.	1981.	1991.	2013.
	Total	2,573	3,166					2,114
1	Berkovići			747	749	651	159	230
2	Hatelji						468	409
3	Ljuti Do						316	233
4	Meča						88	300

=== Ethnic composition ===
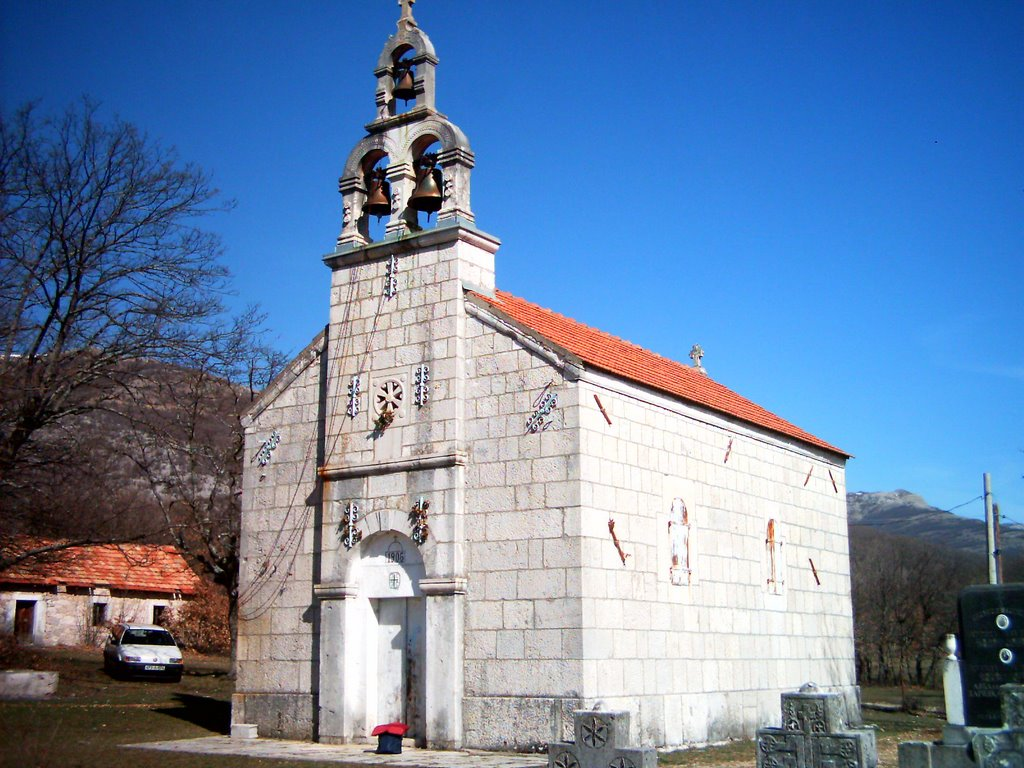
Serbian Orthodox Church in Ljuti Dol

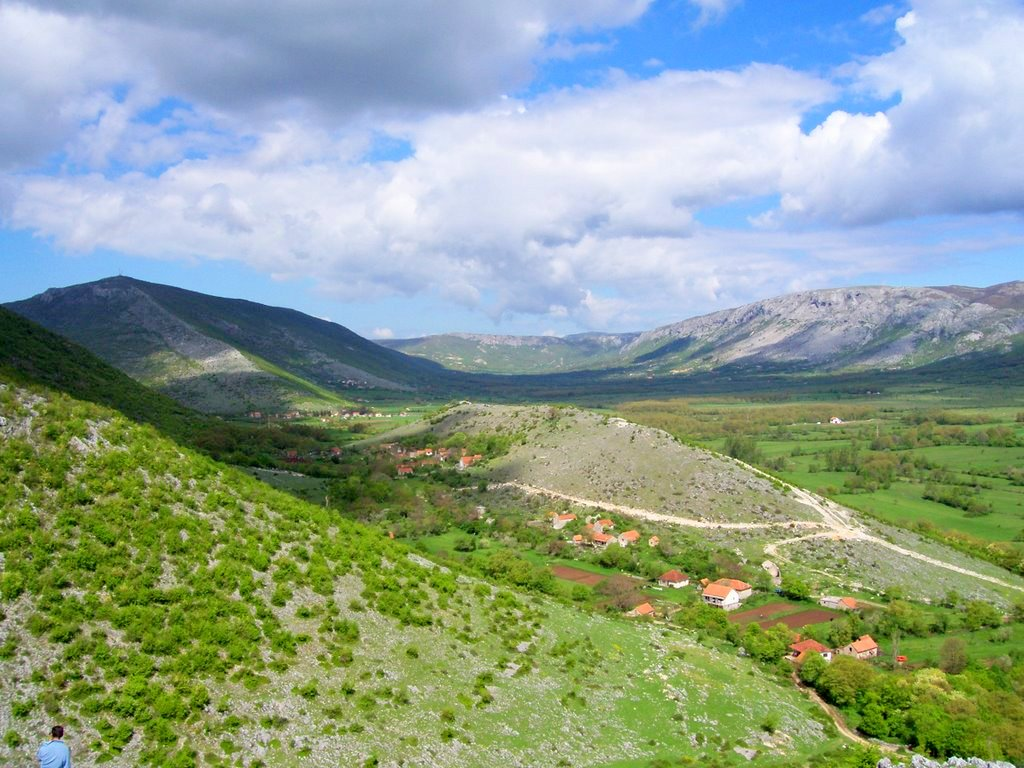
Landscape from Berkovići

Ethnic composition – Berkovići village
	2013	1991.	1981.	1971.
Total	240 (100,0%)	159 (100,0%)	651 (100,0%)	749 (100,0%)
Serbs	238 (99,17%)	147 (97,484%)	611 (93,856%)	744 (100,0%)
Croats	2 (0,83%)		1 (0,154%)	1 (0,134%)
Bosniaks		4 (2,516%)	4 (0,614%)	
Yugoslavs			33 (5,069%)	
Other			2 (0,307%)	2 (0,267%)
Montenegrins				1 (0,134%)
Macedonians				1 (0,134%)

Ethnic composition – Berkovići municipality
	2013
Total	2,114 (100,0%)
Serbs	1,942 (91,86%)
Bosniaks	159 (7,52%)
Croats	11 (0,52%)
Others	2 (0,09%)

== Economy ==
The municipality is underdeveloped and much of the economic activity is agricultural.

== See also ==
- Municipalities of Republika Srpska
