= Ljubinje =

Town and municipality, Bosnia and Herzegovina

Ljubinje Љубиње
- Town and municipality
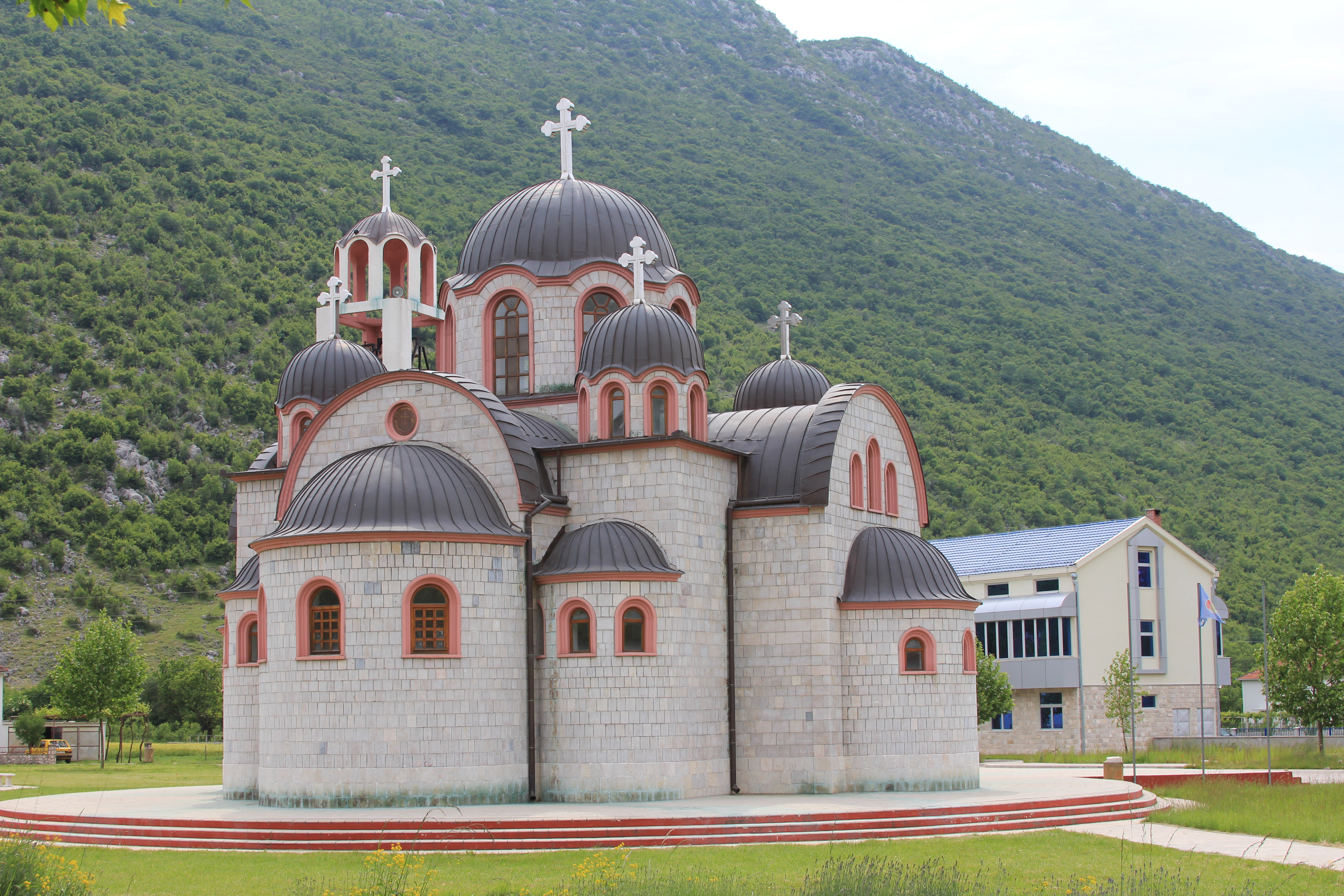
- Serbian Orthodox Church of the Nativity of the Virgin in Ljubinje

- Coat of arms

- Location of Ljubinje within Bosnia and Herzegovina

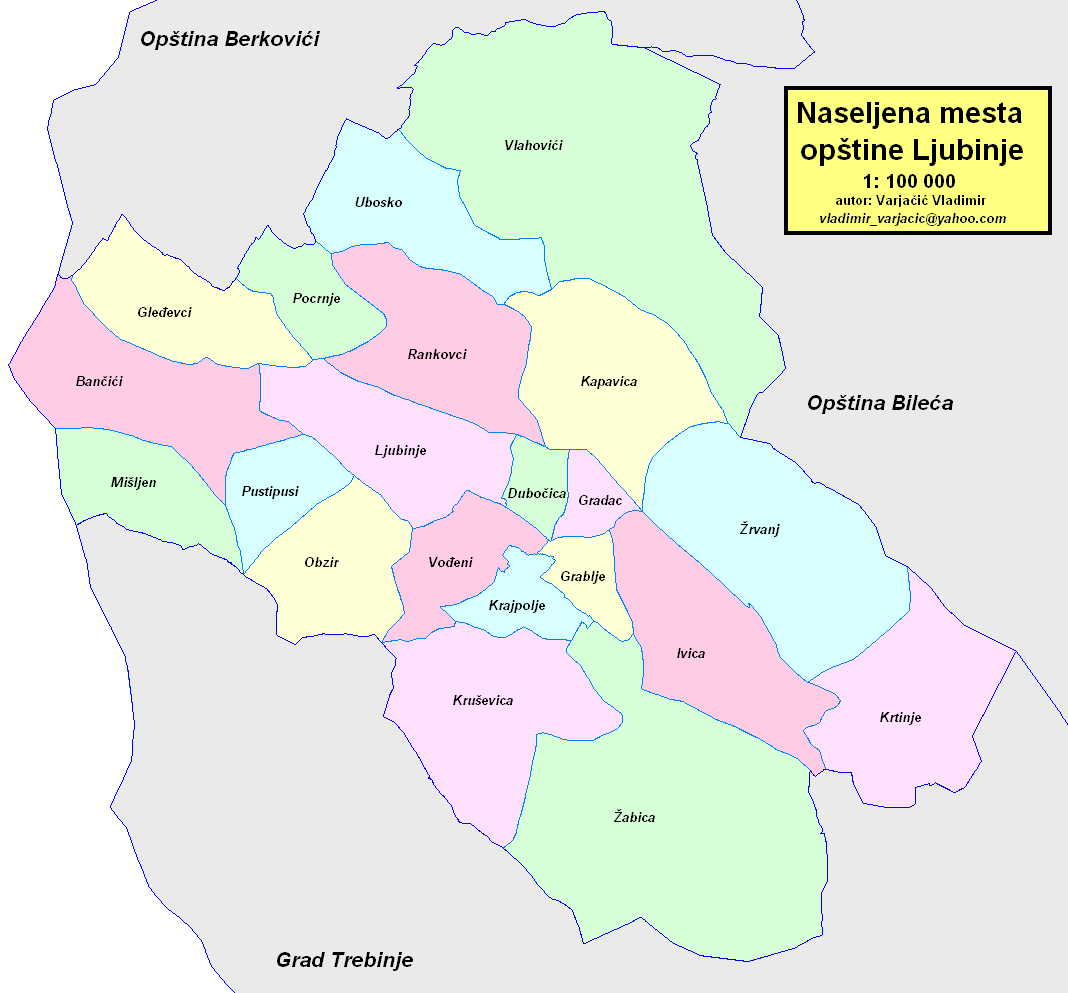
- Coordinates: 42°57′05″N 18°05′25″E
- Country: Bosnia and Herzegovina
- Entity: Republika Srpska
- Geographical region: Herzegovina
- Boroughs: 21 (2008)

Government
  - Municipal mayor: Stevo Drapić (SDS)
  - Municipality: 319.07 km^{2} (123.19 sq mi)

Population (2013 census)
  - Town: 2,744
  - Municipality: 3,511
  - Municipality density: 11.00/km^{2} (28.50/sq mi)
- Time zone: UTC+1 (CET)
  - Summer (DST): UTC+2 (CEST)
- Area code: 59

Ljubinje (Serbian Cyrillic: Љубиње) is a town and municipality in Republika Srpska, Bosnia and Herzegovina. It is situated in southeastern part of Herzegovina. As of 2013, the town has a population of 2,744 inhabitants, while the municipality has 3,511 inhabitants.

== History ==
=== Ancient history ===
In antiquity, a road ran from Narona (near Metković) to Epidaurum (Cavtat) via Pardua, in the present-day village of Gradac near Ljubinje. The remains of a Roman settlement have been identified near Ljubinje. No systematic expert investigations have been conducted in the area (since 1973).

=== Middle Ages ===
In the early medieval period the area of the present-day Ljubinje municipality belonged to the large župa (county) of Popovo, constituting the northernmost part of the Popovo county, bordering the counties of Dubrave and Dabar. Politically, the area belonged to Zahumlje ("Hum"), ruled between the 12th and early 14th century with minor interruptions by the Nemanjić dynasty. After the War of Hum (1326–1329), this part of Hum was occupied by the Bosnian Ban Stjepan II Kotromanić, whose heir Tvrtko I had by 1373 extended the Bosnian borders southwards to include all of Hum. Tvrtko's reign saw the rise of the Kosača family, of whom Vlatko Vuković had already by that time begun to rule much of Hum. Hum was governed by the family through Sandalj Hranić (1392–1435), Stjepan Vukčić Kosača (1435–1466), and the latter's sons, until 1482.

=== Ottoman period ===
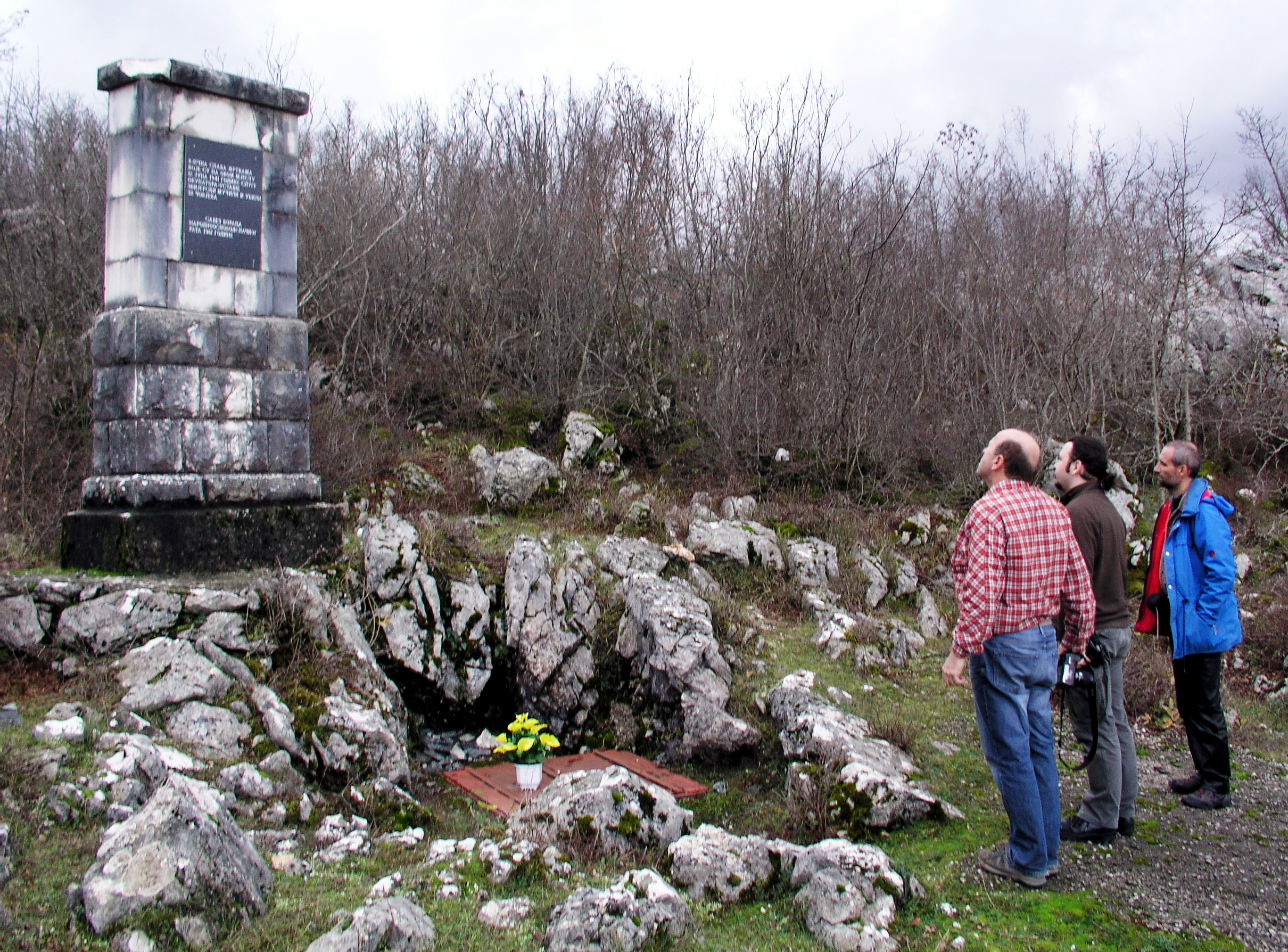
People in front of the Pandurica pit, a place where Ustaše killed 36 locals by throwing them alive into a mass grave, as part of the wider Genocide of the Serbs

The Ottoman Empire occupied the area around Ljubinje between 1465 and 1467, and the defter (tax registry) of the Bosnian sanjak for 1468/69 already included the nahiya of Ljubinje.

=== Austro-Hungarian rule ===
Under article 29 of the Treaty of Berlin of 1878, Austria-Hungary received special rights in the Ottoman Empire's provinces of Bosnia and Herzegovina and the Sanjak of Novi Pazar. On 14 August 1878, the Austro-Hungarian army marched into Ljubinje, ending Ottoman rule in the region. On 6 October 1908, Emperor Franz Joseph announced to the people of Bosnia and Herzegovina his intention to give them an autonomous and constitutional regime. The provinces were then annexed. The annexation of Bosnia and Herzegovina was not countenanced by the Treaty of Berlin and set off a flurry of diplomatic protests and discussions. Ljubinje remained part of the Austro-Hungarian Empire until the liberation at the end of World War I, when the Serbian army marched into Ljubinje.

=== World War II ===
In June 1941 Ustaše soldiers killed 36 locals by throwing them alive into a mass grave, which was part of the wider Genocide of Serbs in the Independent State of Croatia.

== Culture ==
=== Church of the Nativity of the Virgin ===
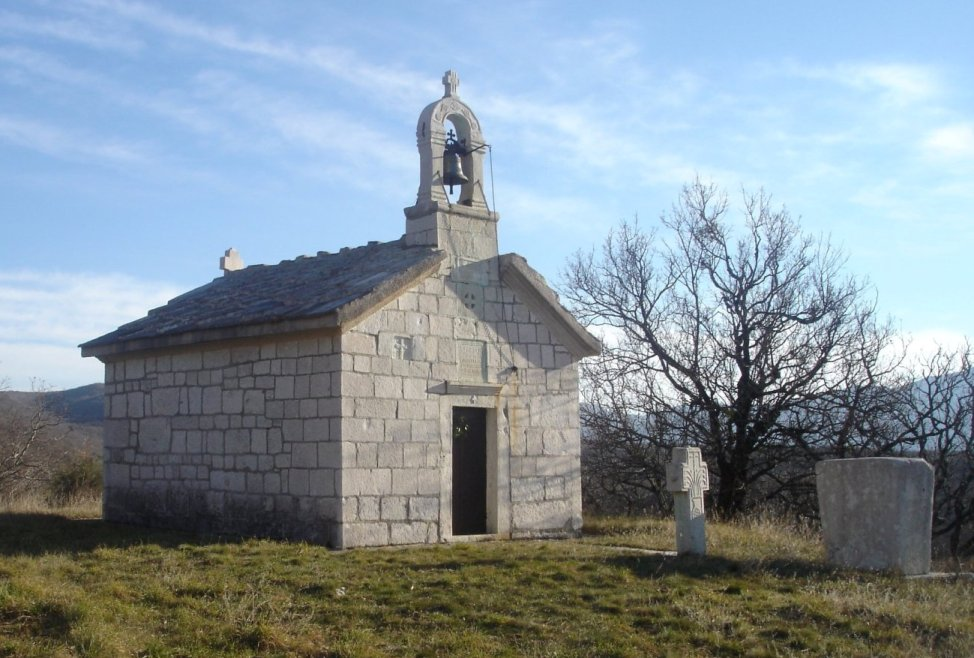
A church in Gradac

The Serbian Orthodox Church of the Nativity of the Virgin in Ljubinje, was built in 1867 (as recorded by the inscription engraved on a plaque above the entrance to the church). The church belongs to a type of Herzegovinian single-nave stone-built church with an apse and a stone belltower — a type known as "na preslicu", perched over the main entrance facade. A belltower na preslicu with three bells, made of finely finished limestone blocks, tops the left wall of the church. Belltowers of this form are one of the main characteristics of churches of this type in Herzegovina. The church is roofed with industrial tiles. Only the ends of the roof panes (of the belltower and apse respectively) are covered with sheet copper. The apse is also covered with sheet copper. The nave is separated from the altar space by an iconostasis partition. The iconostasis of the church of the Nativity of the Most Holy Virgin in Ljubinje was installed in the early 20th century. The artist who painted the icons remains unidentified. The frame of the iconostasis is wooden, and icons are attached to it, with various scenes painted on canvases. The church contains a copy of the Gospels dating from 1793, in a metal cover with two metal clasps to the side, donated from Russia along with a double-sided processional icon, made of copper, by Zorka Radonjić (1901). The centre of one side of the processional icon is occupied by an embossed and engraved scene of the Nativity of Christ, and the other by the Evangelist Luke, also embossed and engraved.

To the north, east and west, the church is surrounded by an Orthodox cemetery in active use, and a necropolis with stećak tombstones. About 20 metres to the north of the church is a mausoleum in memory of World War II victims of fascist terror.

The Commission to Preserve National Monuments in 2005 issued a decision to add the architectural ensemble of the Church of the Nativity of the Virgin in Ljubinje to the List of National Monuments.

=== Church of the Nativity of the Lord Jesus Christ ===
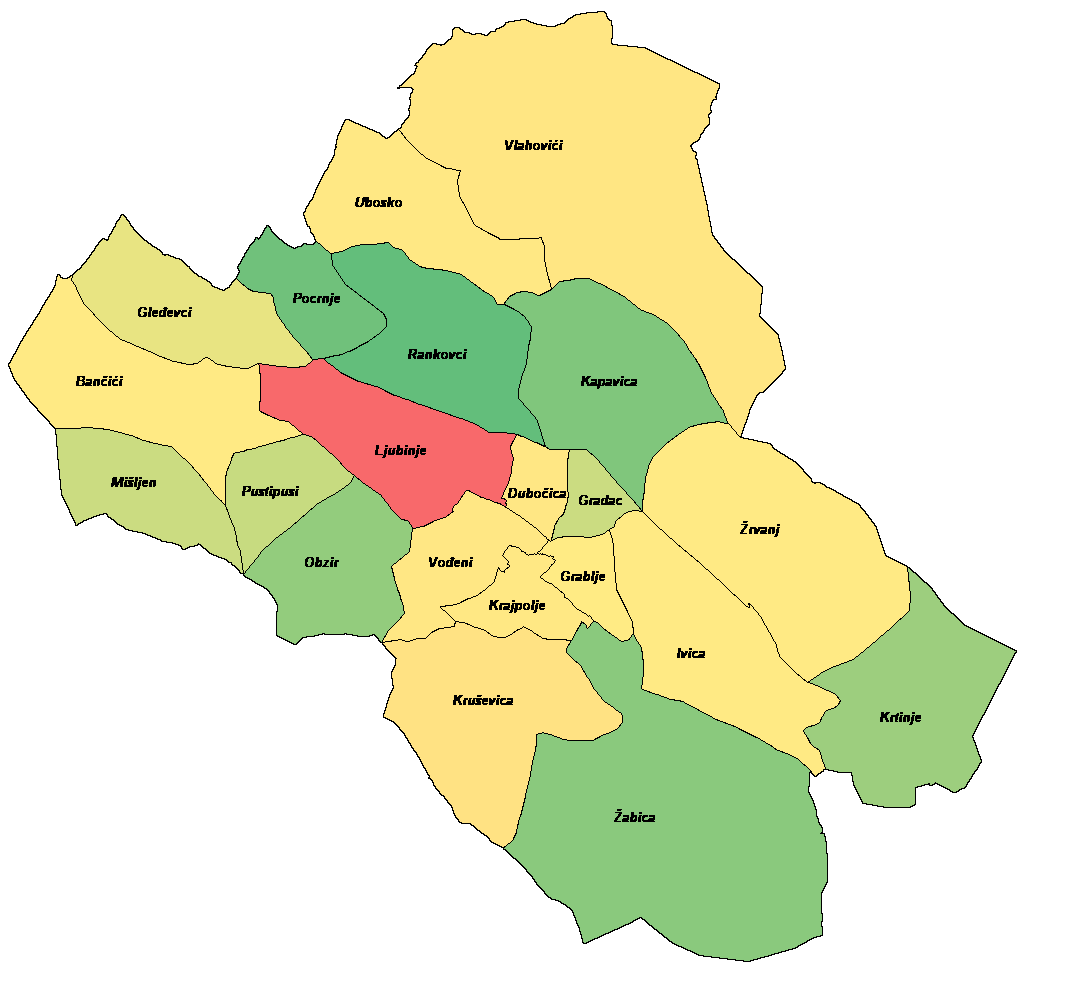
Ljubinje municipality by population proportional to the settlement with the highest and lowest population (1991)

The Serbian Orthodox Church of the Nativity of the Lord Jesus Christ in Ljubinje was designed by the Serbian architect Ljubiša Folić. The church was named after the Nativity of Christ for the fact that its construction started in 2000, an important year in Christianity that actually commemorates its most important event and the reason why it exists in the first place. Completion of the work and consecration of the new Orthodox Cathedral was solemnly celebrated on 21 September 2004, on the Patron Saint's Day of the Ljubinje municipality (The feast day of the Nativity of the Most Holy Theotokos). The Holy Hierarchal Liturgy was served by the episcope Grigorije of Zahumlje, Herzegovina and the Littoral.

== Demographics ==
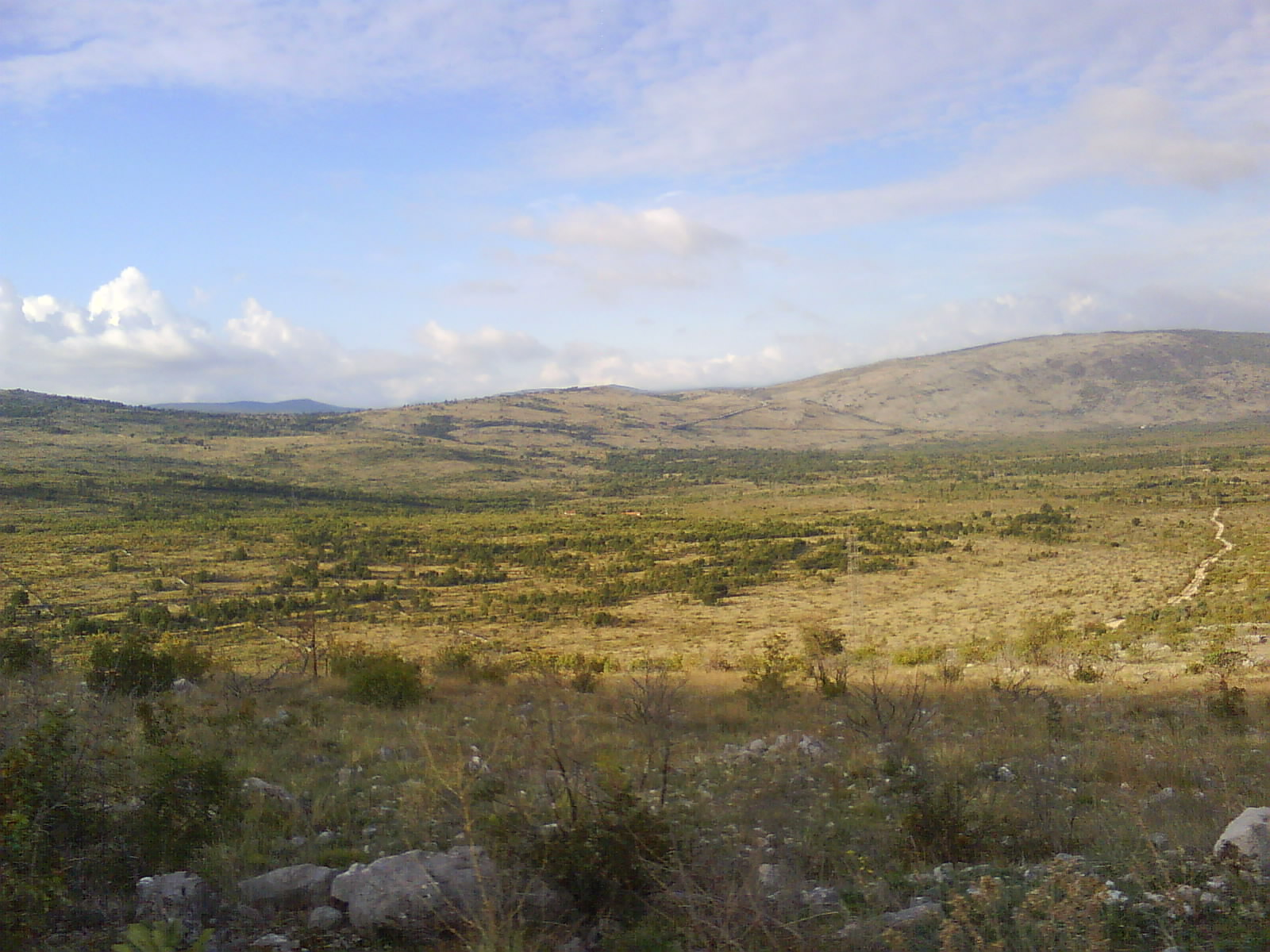
Landscape from Ljubinje

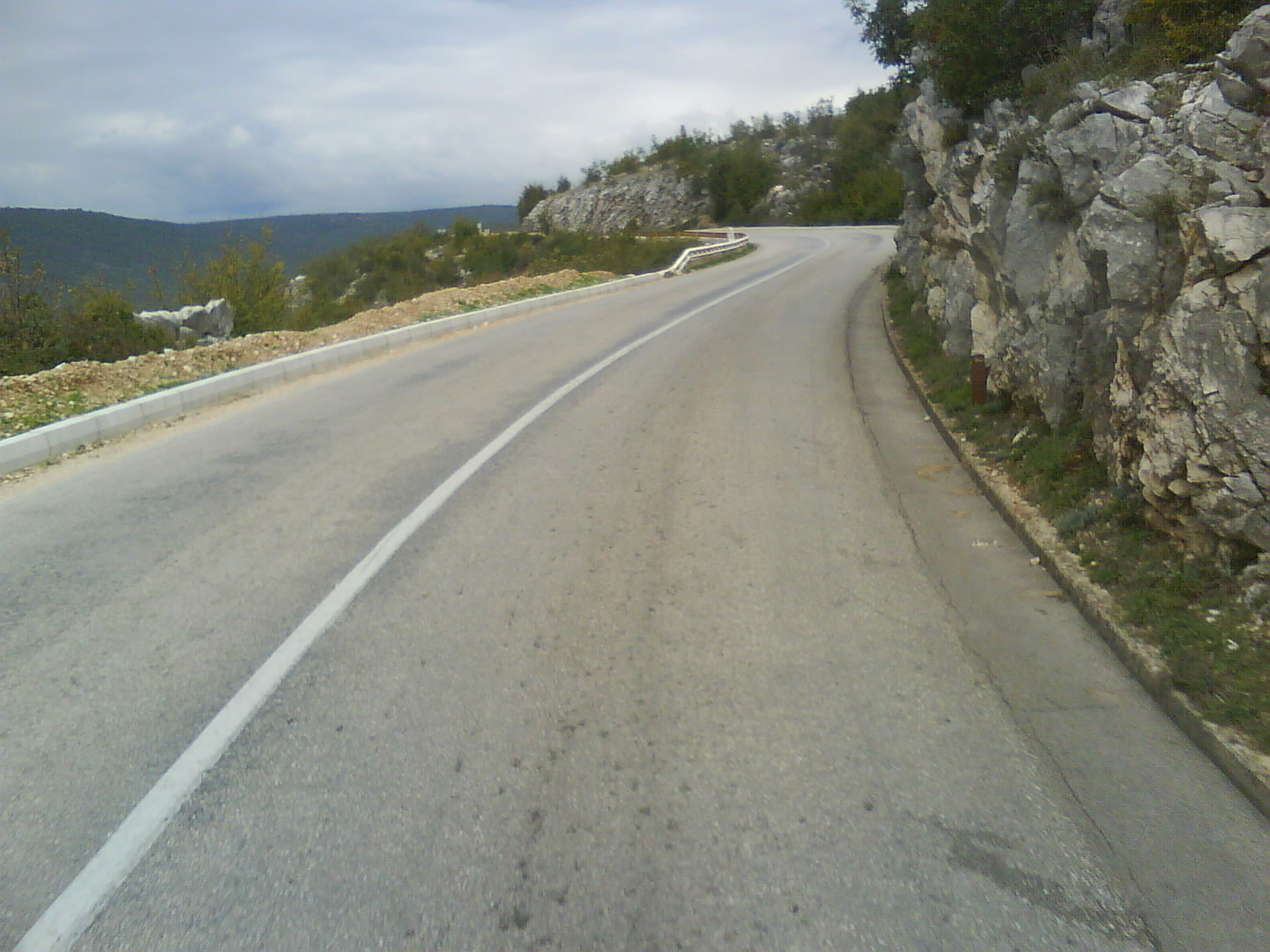
Road towards Ljubinje

=== Population ===
Population of settlements – Ljubinje municipality
	Settlement	1879.	1885.	1895.	1910.	1921.	1931.	1948.	1953.	1961.	1971.	1981.	1991.	2013.
	Total	10,283	11,381	12,238	14,606	14,422	14,980				4,837	4,516	4,172	3,511
1	Bančići												113	
2	Dubočica												160	
3	Gleđevci												74	
4	Grablje												81	
5	Gradac												65	
6	Ivica												99	
7	Kapavica												42	
8	Krajpolje												134	
9	Krtinje												51	
10	Kruševica												233	
11	Ljubinje							503	469	621	796	1,660	2,265	2,744
12	Mišljen												65	
13	Obzir												48	
14	Pocrnje												37	
15	Pustipusi												64	
16	Rankovci												33	
17	Ubosko												142	
18	Vlahovići												169	
19	Vođeni												153	
20	Žabica												45	
21	Žrvanj												99	

=== Ethnic composition ===
Ethnic composition – Ljubinje town
	2013.	1991.	1981.	1971.
Total	2,744 (100,0%)	2,265 (100,0%)	1,660 (100,0%)	796 (100,0%)
Serbs		2,114 (93,33%)	1,448 (87,23%)	710 (89,20%)
Bosniaks		103 (4,547%)	74 (4,458%)	49 (6,156%)
Others		28 (1,236%)	1 (0,060%)	
Yugoslavs		17 (0,751%)	107 (6,446%)	16 (2,010%)
Croats		3 (0,132%)	5 (0,301%)	5 (0,628%)
Montenegrins			22 (1,325%)	8 (1,005%)
Albanians			3 (0,181%)	
Roma				8 (1,005%)

Ethnic composition– Ljubinje municipality
	2013.	1991.	1981.	1971.
Total	3,511 (100,0%)	4,172 (100,0%)	4,516 (100,0%)	4,837 (100,0%)
Serbs	3,469 (98,80%)	3,748 (89,84%)	3,840 (85,03%)	4,170 (86,21%)
Others	20 (0,570%)	34 (0,815%)	11 (0,244%)	16 (0,331%)
Bosniaks	12 (0,342%)	332 (7,958%)	407 (9,012%)	532 (11,00%)
Croats	10 (0,285%)	39 (0,935%)	55 (1,218%)	62 (1,282%)
Yugoslavs		19 (0,455%)	159 (3,521%)	17 (0,351%)
Montenegrins			24 (0,531%)	16 (0,331%)
Roma			17 (0,376%)	8 (0,165%)
Albanians			3 (0,066%)	1 (0,021%)
Slovenes				13 (0,269%)
Macedonians				2 (0,041%)

== Economy ==
The following table gives a preview of the total number of registered people employed in professional fields per their core activity (as of 2018):

Professional field	Total
Agriculture, forestry and fishing	80
Mining and quarrying	-
Manufacturing	48
Electricity, gas, steam and air conditioning supply	19
Water supply; sewerage, waste management and remediation activities	13
Construction	4
Wholesale and retail trade, repair of motor vehicles and motorcycles	70
Transportation and storage	8
Accommodation and food services	39
Information and communication	85
Financial and insurance activities	5
Real estate activities	-
Professional, scientific and technical activities	8
Administrative and support service activities	3
Public administration and defense; compulsory social security	71
Education	78
Human health and social work activities	25
Arts, entertainment and recreation	8
Other service activities	7
Total	571

== Notable residents ==
- Đorđe Đurić, Serbian volleyball player, Olympic bronze medalist
- Gojko Đogo, poet and dissident
- Miroslav Toholj, writer and politician, Information Minister, Minister without portfolio (Government of Republika Srpska)
- Nektarije Krulj, Metropolitan Bishop of Dabar and Bosnia (Serbian Orthodox Church)
- Admir Vladavić, football player

== See also ==
- Municipalities of Republika Srpska

== Notes ==
Secondary sources

- Anđelić, Pavao. 1983. Srednjovjekovna župa Popovo (The mediaeval county of Popovo), Tribunia, no. 7, Trebinje.
- Ćirković, Simo. 1964. Istorija srednjovjekovne bosanske države (History of the mediaeval Bosnian state), Belgrade.
- Aličić, Ahmed. 1985. Poimenični popis sandžaka vilajeta Hercegovina.(Name lists of the sandžak of the vilayet of Herzegovina) Oriental Institute in Sarajevo, Sarajevo.
- Albertini, Luigi. 2005. Origins of the War of 1914 – Vol. 1, Enigma Books, New York.
- Bojanovski, Ivo. 1973. Rimska cesta Narona - Leusinium kao primjer saobraćajnog kontinuiteta. Godišnjak ANUBiH, Centar za balkanološka ispitivanja 10/8, Sarajevo.
