= Conjunto Aristos =

Mixed-use building complex in Mexico City

- The tower (now the Andaz) and, right, the Aguascalientes block (now the Mondrian) from Avenida de los Insurgentes, 2026
- Alternative names: Edificio Aristos; i421 Live District

General information
- Status: Completed
- Type: Mixed-use complex
- Architectural style: International Style
- Location: Avenida de los Insurgentes Sur 421, corner of Aguascalientes, Hipódromo, Cuauhtémoc, Mexico City, Mexico
- Coordinates: 19.4077°N 99.1684°W
- Current tenants: Mondrian Mexico City Condesa; Andaz Mexico City Condesa; Sanborns dept. store
- Construction started: 1958
- Completed: 1961
- Renovated: 2019–2022
- Client: Manuel Klaschky
- Owner: Grupo Murano

Technical details
- Material: White Oaxaca stone
- Floor count: 18 (tower)

Design and construction
- Architect: José Luis Benlliure Galán
- Structural engineer: Emilio Rosenblueth
- Other designers: José Luis Benlliure López de Arana (artworks); Adolfo del Cueto, Oscar Hagerman, Alejandro Schoenhofer, Héctor Ortiz

The Conjunto Aristos is a mixed-use complex on Avenida de los Insurgentes at the corner of Aguascalientes, in Colonia Hipódromo, Mexico City. It was designed by the Spanish-born architect José Luis Benlliure Galán and built from 1958 to 1961. It was one of the first mixed-use buildings in the city, with offices, stores and apartments surrounding a garden space open to the public. The Aristos is clad in white Oaxaca stone and laid out on a grid consisting only of triangles, and no right angles. In 1959 Benlliure wrote that he was praised for rebelling against the "glass boxes and grids" that were in fashion, and that it was the most talked-about building going up in Mexico City at the time. Architect Ricardo Cruz Rodríguez calls it Benlliure's masterpiece, and La Jornada called it one of the most interesting works of contemporary architecture in Mexico City. The complex is catalogued as part of the city's heritage. The Instituto Nacional de Antropología e Historia (INAH) had its headquarters there from 2009 to 2017. After the 2017 Puebla earthquake, it was renovated and converted into two hotels, the Mondrian and the Andaz Mexico City Condesa.

== History ==
The client commissioning the project was engineer Manuel Klaschky (also spelled Klachky), for whom Benlliure had already done a project in 1950. The site was located on what was then the far southwestern edge of the business districts of the city. In 1956 Benlliure had entered a competition for a building with a movie theater on the same lot. That first concept was a 3,000-seat movie theater, a small theater, stores, parking and two 12-story towers, one for offices and one for apartments; Benlliure called it a smaller "Rockefeller-type center" whose rents would pay for an arts center. Klaschky then fell out with Grupo Jenkins, which had an effective monopoly on the city's movie theaters, and so the cinema idea was dropped. In 1958 Benlliure redrew the project on a triangular grid.

The design phase ran from October 1957 to early 1961, and construction from April 1958 to mid-1961. Emilio Rosenblueth headed up the structural engineering. In September 1958, a commission of Federal District engineers called it the best-designed and best-built reinforced concrete structure in Mexico. The walls went up with slip forming, and the foundations were the first in the country to use electro-osmosis. Benlliure's father, architect José Luis Benlliure López de Arana, named it Aristos (Greek for "the best") and assisted with designing the reliefs, paintings, mosaics, sculptures and chimneys. In 1962, both Calli in Mexico and in Arquitectura, the journal of the Madrid college of architects, featured the project.

By the early 1970s the Conjunto Aristos no longer had residents and was home only to offices and stores.

On November 10, 1970, a fire started in an office and reached the top floor. The structure was left undamaged and there were no deaths. Helicopters landed on the terraces during the rescue. Enrique Metinides photographed the fire. The building had no structural damage from the 1985 Mexico City earthquake and was remodeled afterwards. Later, the owners closed the public passage between Insurgentes and Aguascalientes streets, and the garden was paved over with stone.

INAH, the National Institute of Anthropology and History, rented the building starting in 2009. In the 2017 earthquake, part of the wavy roofs of the Aguascalientes block fell in, and ground-floor columns cracked. A month later, INAH and its nearly 800 employees moved out. Grupo Murano then spent around US$100 million converting it into the i421 Live District. The 183-room Mondrian Mexico City Condesa, the first Mondrian (an Ennismore brand) in Latin America, opened in December 2022. The 213-room Andaz Mexico City Condesa, Hyatt's first Andaz in the city, opened in January 2023 in a 17-story tower. Sanborns, a small department store and restaurant, still takes up much of the ground floor including the wedge-shaped corner and is known as the "Sanborns del Aristos".

The Sanborns at the corner of Insurgentes and Aguascalientes, 2026

== Architecture ==
=== Buildings ===
A base, raised one level and covering about 85 percent of the 5,232 m^{2} (56,320 sq ft) trapezoidal lot, holds two buildings that do not touch: an 18-story tower on Insurgentes and a nine-story building on Aguascalientes. There is also a smaller four-story building to the south. The ground floor was meant to be public, with passages from both streets to what was originally a garden in the middle. Everything sits on a grid of equilateral triangles 5.84 m (19.2 ft) per side, with round columns, and no element has a right-angled joint or edge. One horizontal window, in a 1:120 proportion, runs the whole length of the base on both streets and around the corner. Benlliure named as his influences Erich Mendelsohn, Francesco Borromini, Antoni Gaudí and, for the garden, Brazilian architecture. Cruz Rodríguez compared the window proportions to the friars' façade at El Escorial, and the courtyard to Borromini's Sant'Ivo alla Sapienza.

Two of Benlliure's exterior murals still decorate the façade.

The relief over the Insurgentes entrance

=== Reliefs ===
Over the Insurgentes entrance is a 21.8 by 4.74 m (71.5 by 15.6 ft) relief in the same stone. Benlliure drew it; his letters say a master stonecutter carved it from his drawings, but Cruz Rodríguez (2014) says Benlliure carved it himself. In 1960, Benlliure described the subject as Greeks landing ships in a Mediterranean cove, both for the Greek trade that spread art and culture, as well as for the building's Greek name, though he admitted that he picked it more for decoration than for symbolism. Cruz Rodríguez called it fishermen lit by Apollo.

For the back of the courtyard, Benlliure modeled a relief himself, an allegory of liberty as a teenage girl.

=== Mosaics ===
The Aguascalientes entrance has a geometric mosaic of the Panathenaic procession. The most recent renovation to two hotels reinterpreted his mosaics above the hotel room beds.

A new mosaic mural in the lobby by Carlos Baeza of Tatiana Bilbao's studio is a homage to the building and to Benlliure.

=== Courtyard and fountain ===
In 1959, Benlliure redesigned the wavy courtyard fountain as a homage to Gaudí. He said he designed the courtyard for ordinary people: women out shopping, and children playing with toy boats in the fountains.

== Gallery ==
The complex at sunset from Insurgentes

The Aguascalientes block, now the Mondrian

The tower from the courtyard, over the main fountain

Main courtyard fountain

The fountain from an upper floor

Original 1960 mosaic mural

Homage mural by Carlos Baeza, Tatiana Bilbao's studio

Andaz (left) and Mondrian (right) lobbies

Andaz escalators

Andaz upper-floor corridor

Café on the courtyard level

Day of the Dead offering in the lobby

Inside the Sanborns

The Sanborns restaurant
