= José Luis Benlliure Galán =

Spanish-born Mexican architect (1928–1994)

- Born: 16 March 1928; Madrid, Spain
- Died: 9 March 1994 (aged 65); Mexico City, Mexico
- Education: UNAM (1955)
- Occupation: Architect
- Spouse: María del Carmen Bilbao Durán
- Parent(s): José Luis Benlliure López de Arana; Soledad Galán Guerra
- Buildings: Conjunto Aristos; Museo Mural Diego Rivera

José Luis Benlliure Galán (16 March 1928 – 9 March 1994) was a Spanish-born Mexican architect. He was the son of architect José Luis Benlliure López de Arana and grandson of sculptor Mariano Benlliure. He came to Mexico in 1939 with the Republican exile, but went back to Spain with his family in 1948 and studied in Rome. In 1950, he returned to Mexico alone. He graduated from the National School of Architecture of UNAM in 1955 and had the Higher Technical School of Architecture of Madrid recognize his degree in 1965. He taught at UNAM from 1956 to 1993. His best-known work is the mixed-use Conjunto Aristos on Avenida de los Insurgentes at the corner of Aguascalientes, now home to two hotels, an Andaz and a Mondrian.

== Works ==
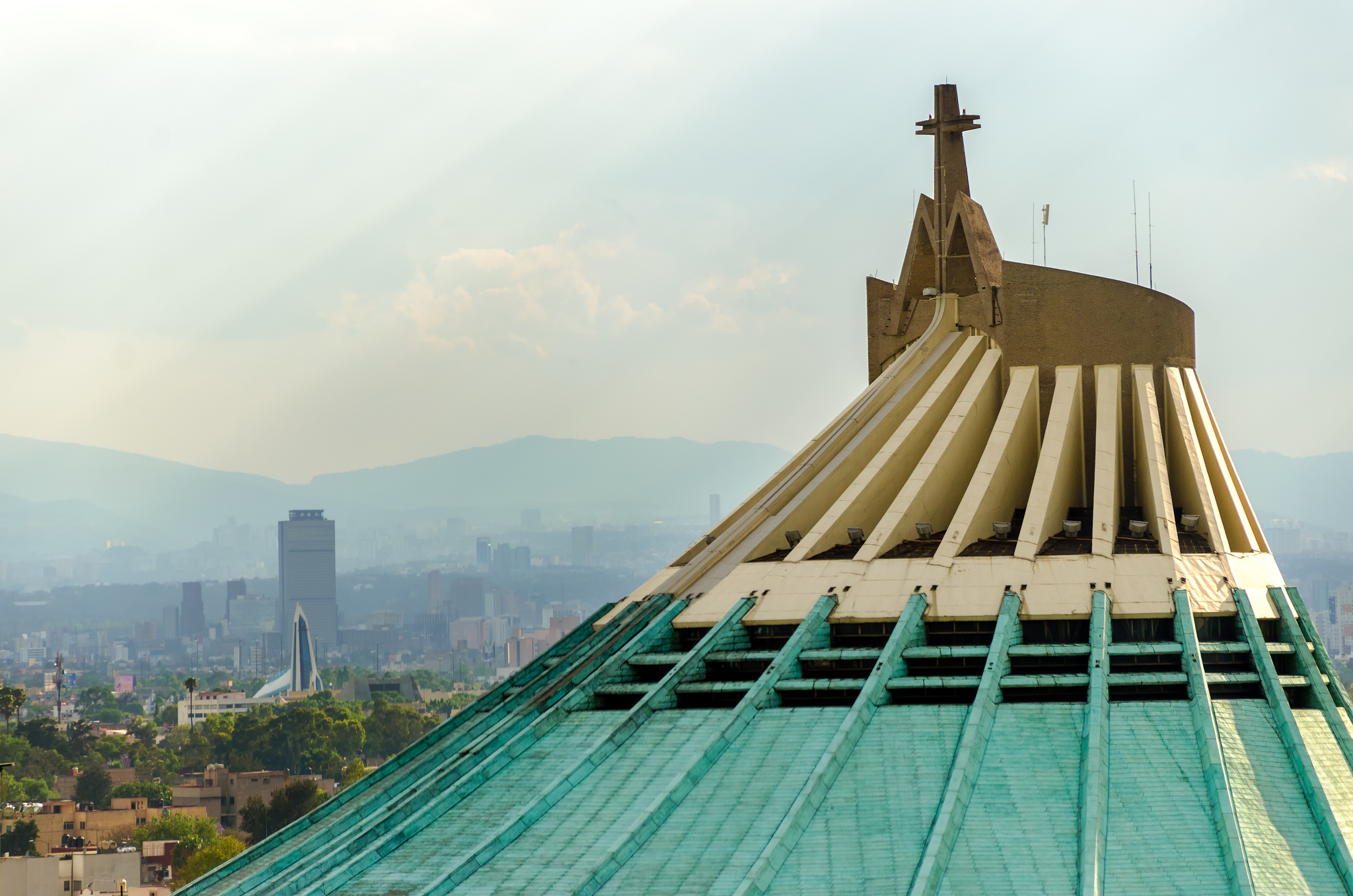
Basilica of Our Lady of Guadalupe (1974–1976)

Relief on the Conjunto Aristos, Avenida de los Insurgentes

Sanborns in the Conjunto Aristos

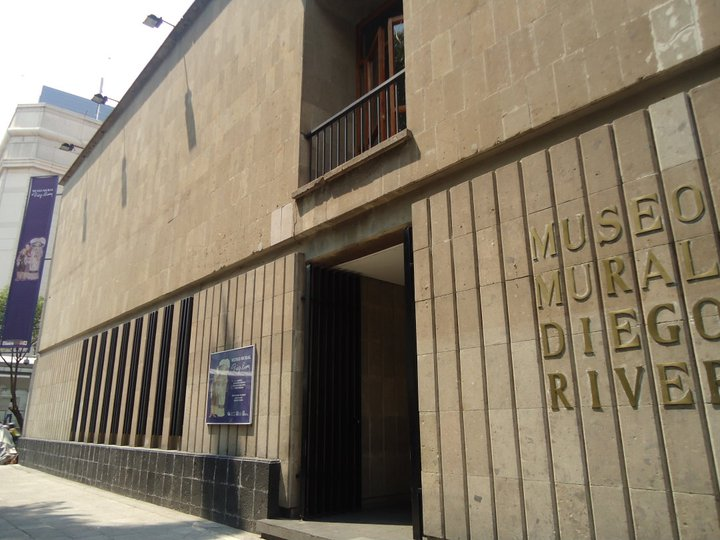
Entrance of the Museo Mural Diego Rivera

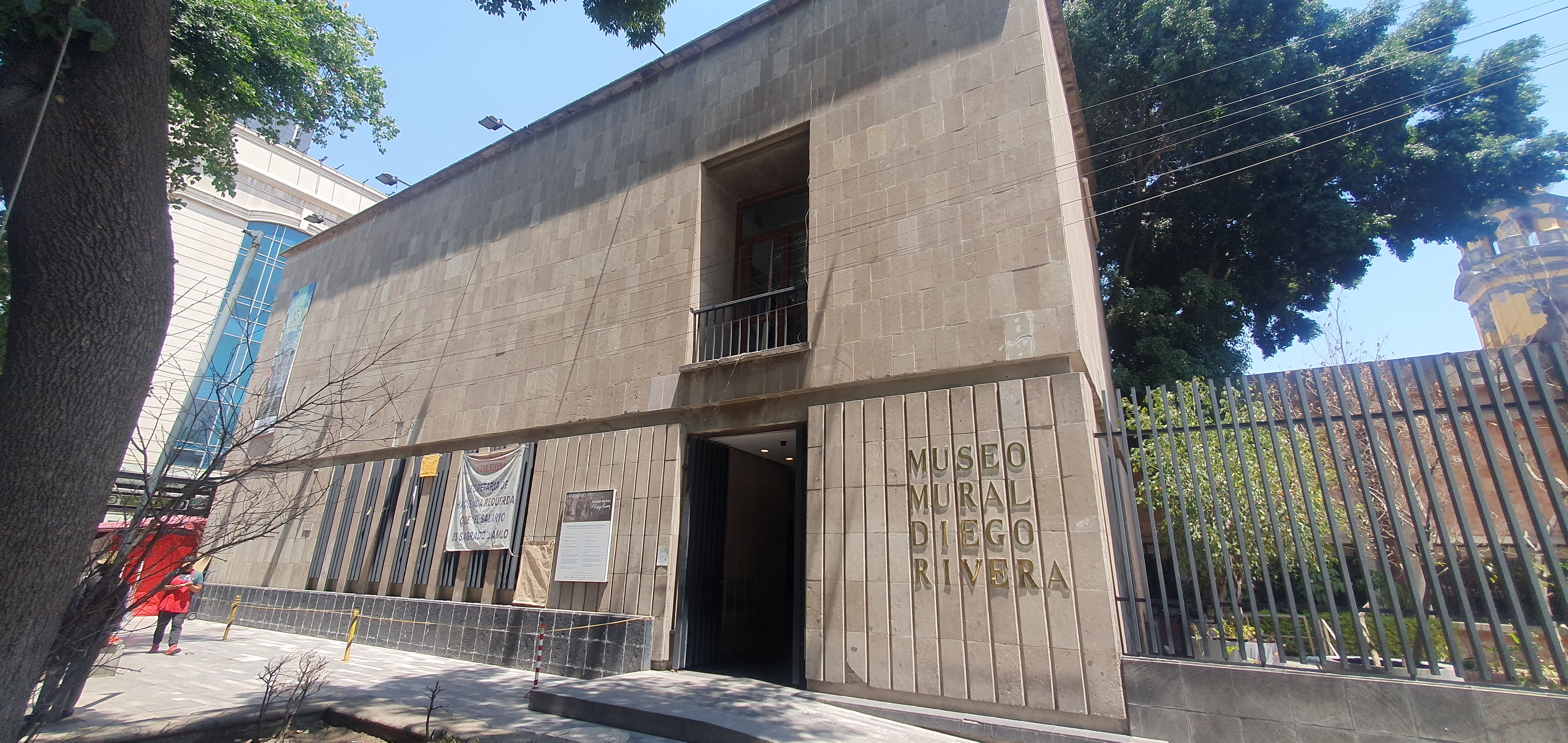
Façade of the Museo Mural Diego Rivera (1986–1988)

| Year | Work | Location | Country | Notes |
|---|---|---|---|---|
| 1954–1955 | Minor Seminary of the Archdiocese of Mexico | Tlalpan, Mexico City | Mexico | With José Cano Vallado and Pedro Fernández Miret |
| 1954 | Church of Our Lady of the Miraculous Medal | Colonia Narvarte, Mexico City | Mexico | With Félix Candela and Pedro Fernández Miret |
| 1957–1961 | Conjunto Aristos, now housing the Andaz and Mondrian hotels | Avenida de los Insurgentes Sur 421, colonia Hipódromo, Mexico City | Mexico | Client: engineer Manuel Klaschky; structural engineer Emilio Rosenblueth; studio team Adolfo del Cueto, Óscar Hagerman, Alejandro Schoenhofer and Héctor Ortiz |
| 1962–1963 | Apartments on Albir beach | Altea | Spain | With his father and Gabriel Sancho |
| 1963–1965 | Casa Capdevila | Somosaguas, near Madrid | Spain | With his father |
| 1964–1972 | Casa Enseñat | Somosaguas | Spain | With his father |
| 1964–1968 | Pastejé industrial park | Jocotitlán, State of Mexico | Mexico | With Alberto González Pozo and Juan Antonio Tonda |
| 1974–1976 | Basilica of Our Lady of Guadalupe | Mexico City | Mexico | With Pedro Ramírez Vázquez, Gabriel Chávez de la Mora and others; he had earlier made several preliminary designs for Tepeyac Hill |
| 1979–1985 | House for Arturo Prado | Valle de Bravo, State of Mexico | Mexico | |
| 1982 | Library of the Instituto Mora | Mexico City | Mexico | |
| 1985 | Extension of the Museo Nacional de San Carlos | Mexico City | Mexico | |
| 1985 | Bank of Mexico annex | Northeast corner of 5 de Mayo Street and Callejón de la Condesa, Mexico City | Mexico | With a bas-relief of a winged victory of his own design |
| 1985 | Mexico City Chamber of Commerce (integration work) | Paseo de la Reforma 42, Mexico City | Mexico | |
| After 1985 | L-shaped building wrapping around the La Palestina leather goods shop | Cinco de Mayo and Bolívar, Mexico City | Mexico | One façade matched to La Palestina, the other to the former Convento de Betlemitas, now the Interactive Museum of Economics |
| After 1985 | Plaza of the Palacio de Bellas Artes | Mexico City | Mexico | Converted from a parking lot into a pedestrian plaza with fountains and planters |
| After 1985 | Rebuilding of structures damaged by the earthquake | Historic center of Mexico City | Mexico | With Juan Urquiaga of the INBA |
| 1986–1988 | Museo Mural Diego Rivera | Next to the Alameda Central, Mexico City | Mexico | |
| 1991 | Cultural center and administration building of the UAM Azcapotzalco | Mexico City | Mexico | |

=== Competitions ===
| Year | Project | Location | Country | Notes |
|---|---|---|---|---|
| 1956 | Office building and cinema | Avenida de los Insurgentes, Mexico City | Mexico | On the later site of the Conjunto Aristos, for the same client; the thesis calls it the "first Aristos" |
| 1963–1964 | New Madrid Opera House | Madrid | Spain | Never built |
| 1964–1965 | Euro-Kursaal | San Sebastián | Spain | Honorable mention; the site is now occupied by the Kursaal Congress Centre and Auditorium |

== See also ==
- Architecture of Mexico
- List of Mexican architects
- Spanish Republican exiles

== Bibliography ==
- Cruz Rodríguez, Ricardo Nathaniel (2018). José Luis Benlliure Galán, arquitecto. Primeros proyectos, primeras obras (Licenciatura (architecture) thesis) (in Spanish). Mexico City: Facultad de Arquitectura, National Autonomous University of Mexico. (catalogue of his works 1946–1960, with a chapter on the Conjunto Aristos, pp. 765–910)
- López Rangel, Rafael (2012). José Luis Benlliure: un clásico de la arquitectura contemporánea en México. Colección Arquitectura (in Spanish) (1st ed.). Mexico City: Facultad de Arquitectura, UNAM; Universidad Autónoma Metropolitana. ISBN 978-607-02-3315-9.
- Cruz Rodríguez, Ricardo Nathaniel. "Alma de arquitecto: José Luis Benlliure Galán en España" (PDF). I Congreso Pioneros de la Arquitectura Moderna Española (in Spanish).
- Cervantes García, Tadeo; Benítez Gómez, Nuria (2013). "Reseñas". Bitácora Arquitectura (in Spanish). Facultad de Arquitectura, UNAM. (review of López Rangel's book)
