= Plaza de la Solidaridad =

Coordinates: 19°26′8.016″N 99°8′48.192″W

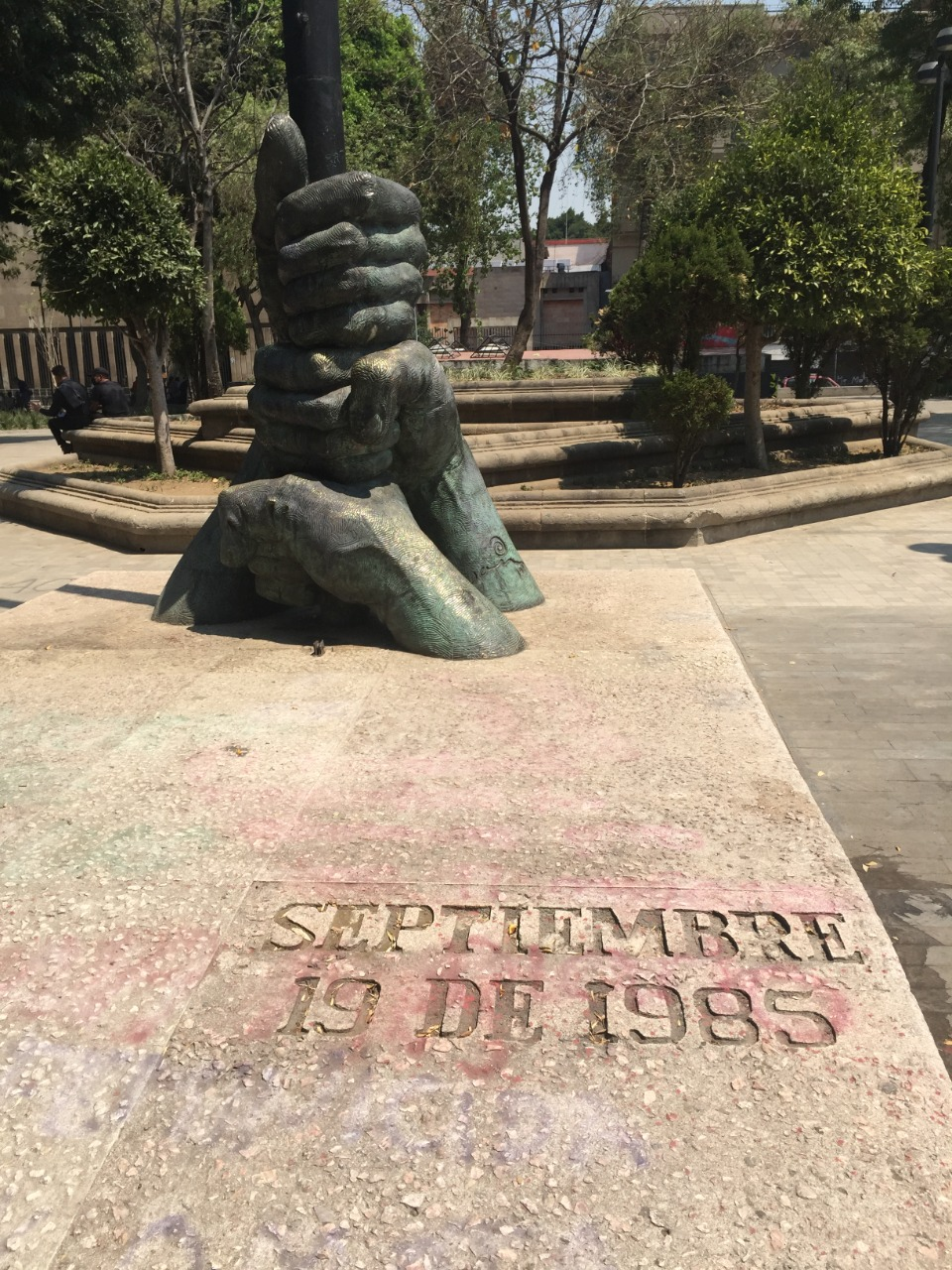
- Monument in the plaza honoring the victims and rescuers of the 1985 Mexico earthquake, appreciated in 2022
- Interactive map of Plaza de la Solidaridad
- Location: Mexico City, Mexico

The Plaza de la Solidaridad is a plaza located in Mexico City, Mexico, adjacent to the Alameda Central. During the sixteenth century, the area in which the park is now located was on the outskirts of the city. When the city grew and urbanized, the Convent of San Diego occupied the space.

A sculpture in the center of the square simultaneously commemorates the victims that died and honors the first responders of the 1985 Mexico City earthquake.

== Gallery ==
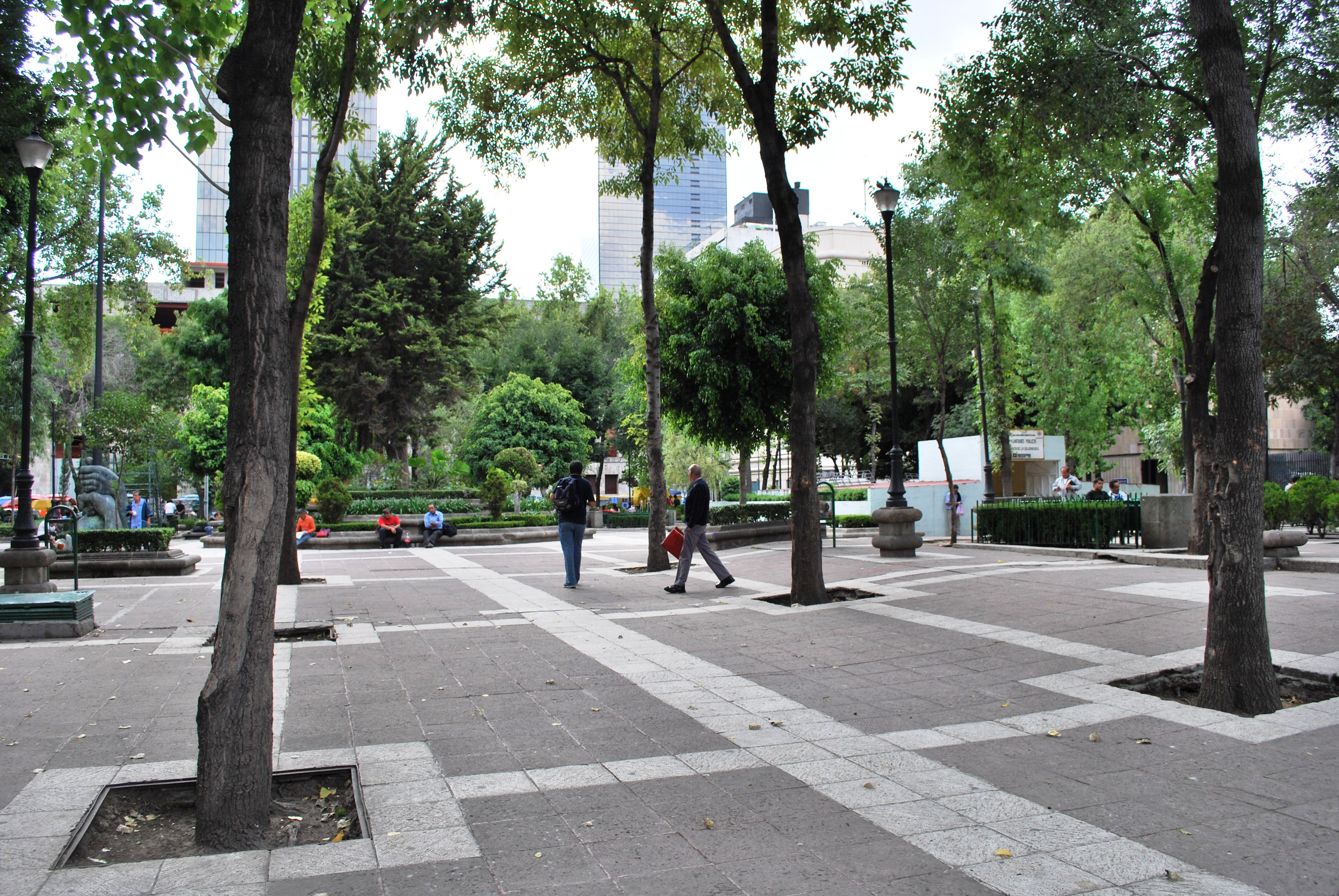
Part of the plaza in 2009.

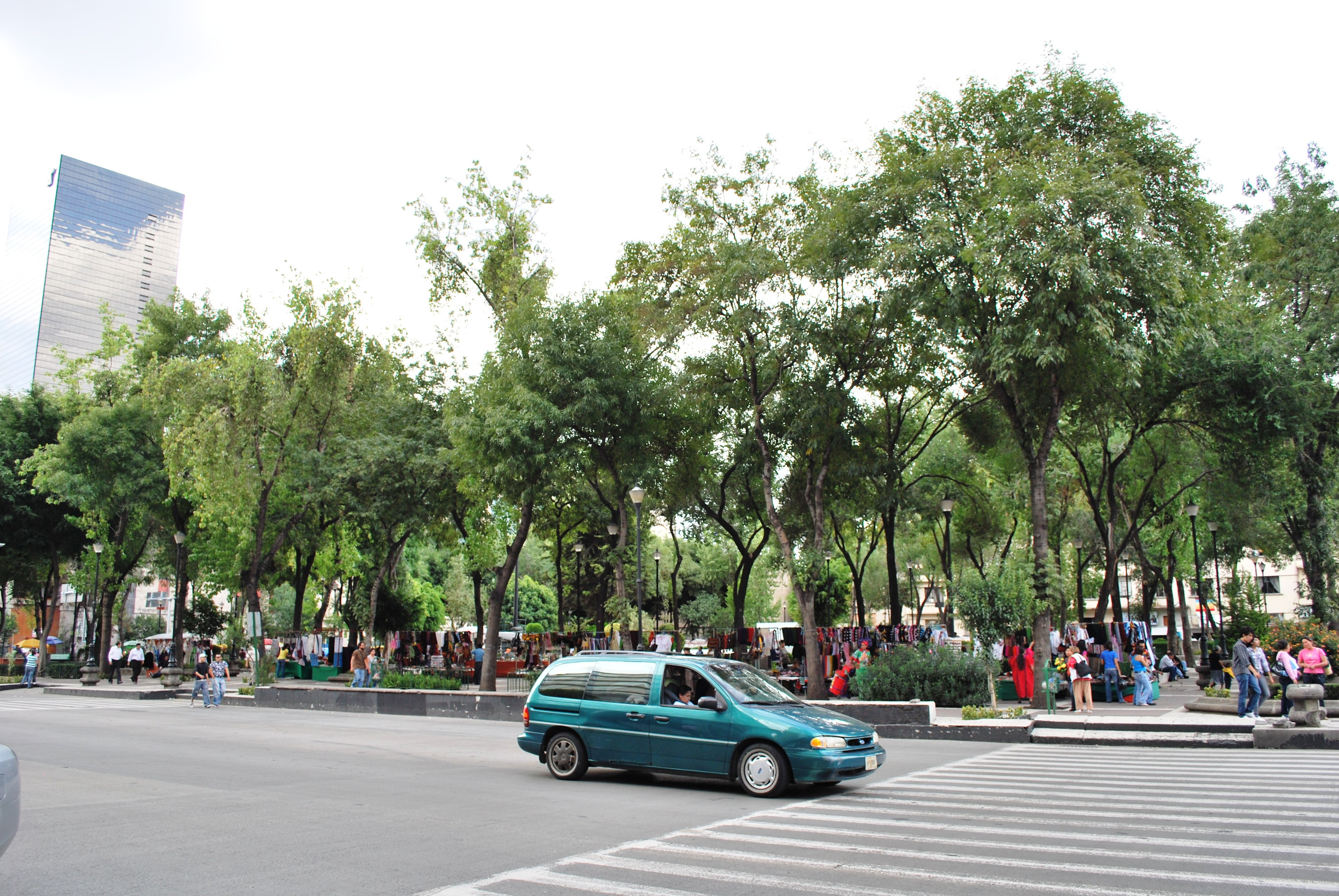
View of the plaza through Juarez avenue.

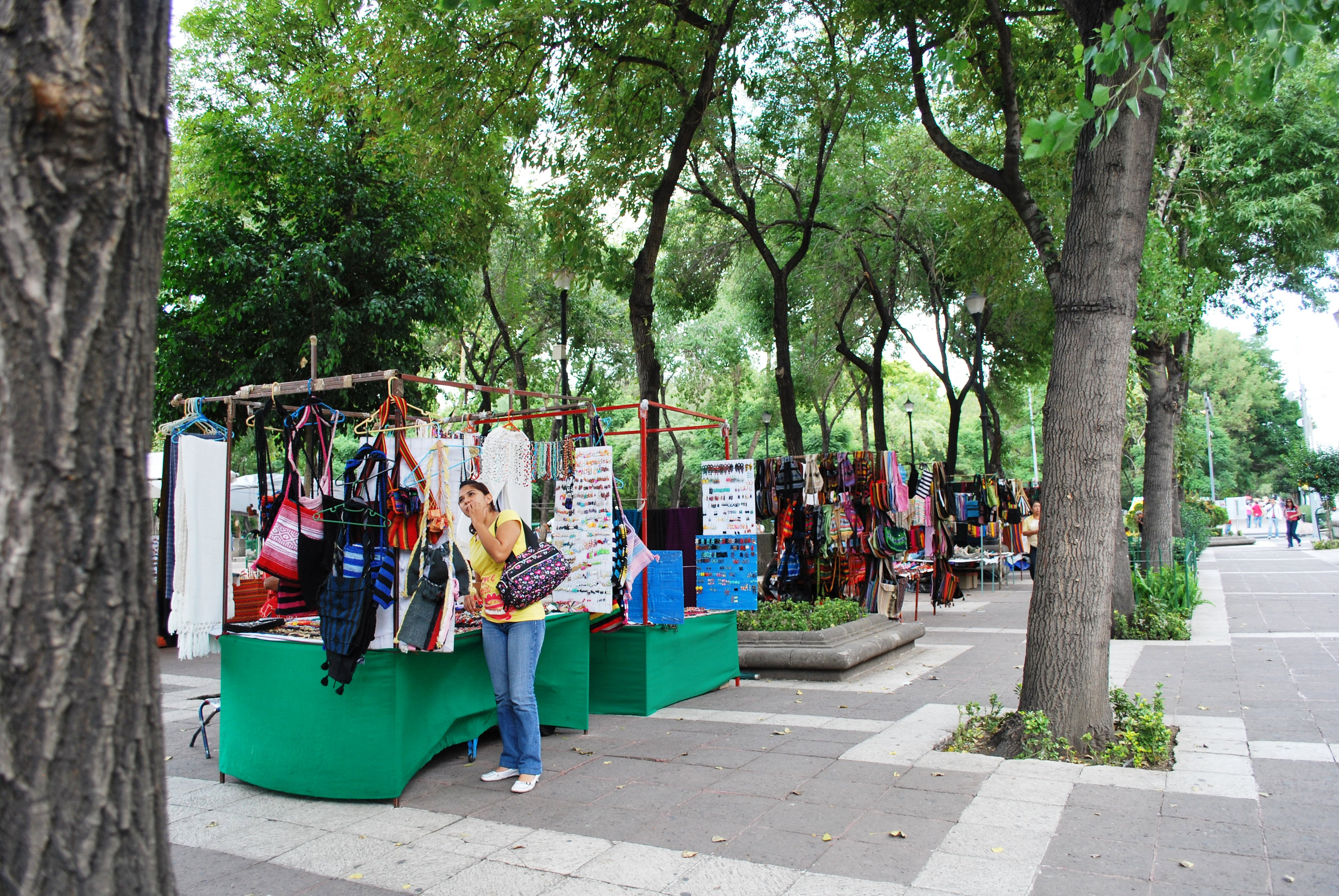
Vendors' stalls in the plaza.
