= La Palestina =

Leather goods store in Mexico City, founded 1884

- The La Palestina building on the corner of 5 de Mayo and Bolívar

General information
- Location: Mexico City, Mexico
- Completed: 1903

La Palestina is a leather goods store at Avenida Cinco de Mayo #20, on the corner of Bolívar street in the Historic center of Mexico City. Juan Rosales Ortiz opened it in 1884 as a talabartería (saddlery) selling tack and charrería gear. It still has its gilded bronze railing with horse figures, where horses and carriages were once tied up.

The six-story building that houses the store designed by Alfredo Robles Domínguez and completed in 1903, on part of the site of the Teatro Nacional, and was the first building of that height in the city. During the Porfiriato (Porfirio Díaz dictatorship), the top floor held the editorial office of the magazine Savia Moderna. The L-shaped building that wraps around it is the work of José Luis Benlliure Galán, who gave it a façade on 5 de Mayo in keeping with La Palestina's scale and color. The name of the establishment is not a reference to the origins of the owners, but rather was named after the land of Jesus due to the founder's Christian beliefs.

The store entrance in 2025, with its sign reading Almacenes de Talabartería y Artefactos Nacionales

The store still sells saddlery, along with backpacks, suitcases, briefcases, wallets and bags.
