= Iglesia de la Medalla de la Virgen Milagrosa =

- Location in Mexico City

General information
- Coordinates: 19.37950°N 99.1573°W
- Construction started: 1953
- Completed: 1955

Design and construction
- Architects: Félix Candela, José Luis Benlliure Galán, Pedro F. Miret

Our Lady of the Miraculous Medal Church, known in Spanish as Iglesia de la Medalla de la Virgen Milagrosa or simply Iglesia de la Medalla Milagrosa is a church in Colonia Narvarte, Mexico City, Mexico. The church was designed by three Spanish-Mexican architects: Félix Candela, José Luis Benlliure Galán and Pedro F. Miret, and built between 1953 and 1955.

The monks who had commissioned the project favored a Gothic building and reportedly did not realize the design's modern style until after construction had started.
