= Andaz =

Andaz may refer to:

- Andaz (album), a 2001 album by the Pakistani rock band Junoon
- Andaz (1949 film), a 1949 film directed by Mehboob Khan
- Andaz (1971 film), a 1971 film directed by Ramesh Sippy
- Andaz (1994 film), a 1994 film directed by David Dhawan
- Andaz, a brand of hotels managed by Hyatt Hotels Corporation

== See also ==
- Andaaz, a 2003 film directed by Raj Kanwar
