= Emilio Rosenblueth =

Mexican engineer (1926–1994)

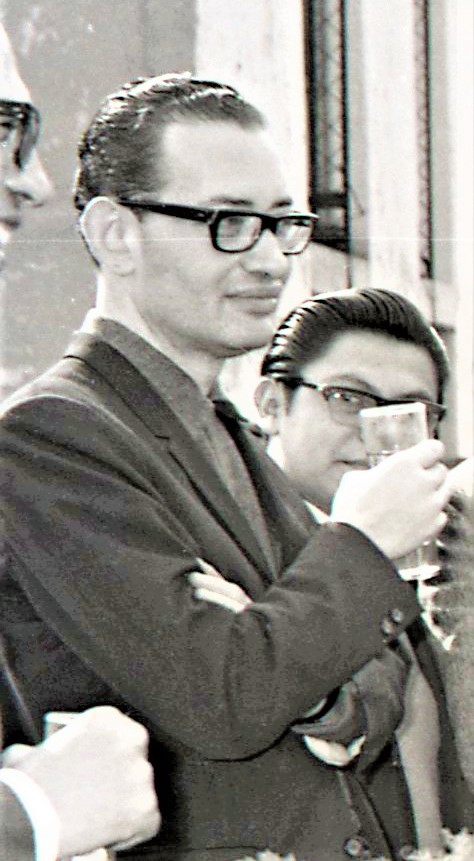
- Born: Emilio Rosenblueth Deutsch; April 8, 1926; Mexico City, Mexico
- Died: January 11, 1994 (aged 67); Mexico City, Mexico
- Education: National Autonomous University of Mexico (1949); University of Illinois (1951)
- Occupations: Engineer & professor

Emilio Rosenblueth Deutsch (1926–1994) was a Mexican engineer who devoted himself to the research of seismic events, and in particular to study the behavior of buildings against earthquakes and other seismic activity.

Born in Mexico City, Rosenblueth was the only child of Emilio Rosenblueth Stearns and Charlotte Deutsch Kleinman. His parents were Hungarian-Jewish émigrés who lived in Germany and moved to Mexico before he was born.

== University Studies ==
Emilio Rosenblueth grew up in a family of leading researchers, so from an early age he was inclined towards the sciences. He became interested in seismic phenomena due to the location of his hometown and its high propensity for earthquake activity. He began his university studies at the National Autonomous University of Mexico (UNAM for its name in Spanish) where he obtained a bachelor's degree in 1948. He received a master's degree in 1949 and a PhD in 1951 from the University of Illinois.

He was an advisor to Unesco and the Organization of American States (OAS) on seismic and scientific research. He was a member of Mexican and foreign academies and associations, such as the Academia de la Investigación Científica, the Colegio de Ingenieros Civiles de México, the Sociedad Mexicana de Ingeniería Sísmica, the Sociedad Mexicana de Mecánica de Suelos, the American Society of Civil Engineers, the American Concrete Institute, the Seismological Society of America, the International Association for Earthquake Engineering, the Asociación Latinoamerican de Sismología e Ingeniería Antisísmica, the Unión Panamericana de Asociaciones de Ingenieros, and the National Academy of Sciences of the United States.

== Awards and distinctions ==
- Scientific Research Award of the Mexican Academy of Sciences, 1963.
- Member of El Colegio Nacional on April 4, 1972.
- Luis Elizondo" Science Award in 1973.
- National Award of Sciences and Arts in the area of Physical-Mathematical and Natural Sciences by the Mexican Government in 1974.
- Emeritus Researcher of the Institute of Engineering of the UNAM in 1988.
- Prince of Asturias Award, by the government of Spain in 1985.
- In his honor, the secondary school 305, located in Guadalupe I. Ramírez, s/n, Potrero de San Bernardino is named after him.
