= Félix Candela =

Spanish and Mexican architect

Félix Candela Outeriño
- Born: January 27, 1910; Madrid, Spain
- Died: December 7, 1997 (aged 87); Durham, North Carolina, United States
- Education: Madrid School of Architecture
- Spouse(s): Eladia Martin, Dorothy Candela
- Engineering career
- Discipline: Architecture
- Institutions: Institution of Structural Engineers
- Projects: Ciutat de les Arts i les Ciències, Palacio de los Deportes
- Significant design: thin shells
- Awards: IStructE Gold Medal, Augusto Perret prize of the Architects International Union

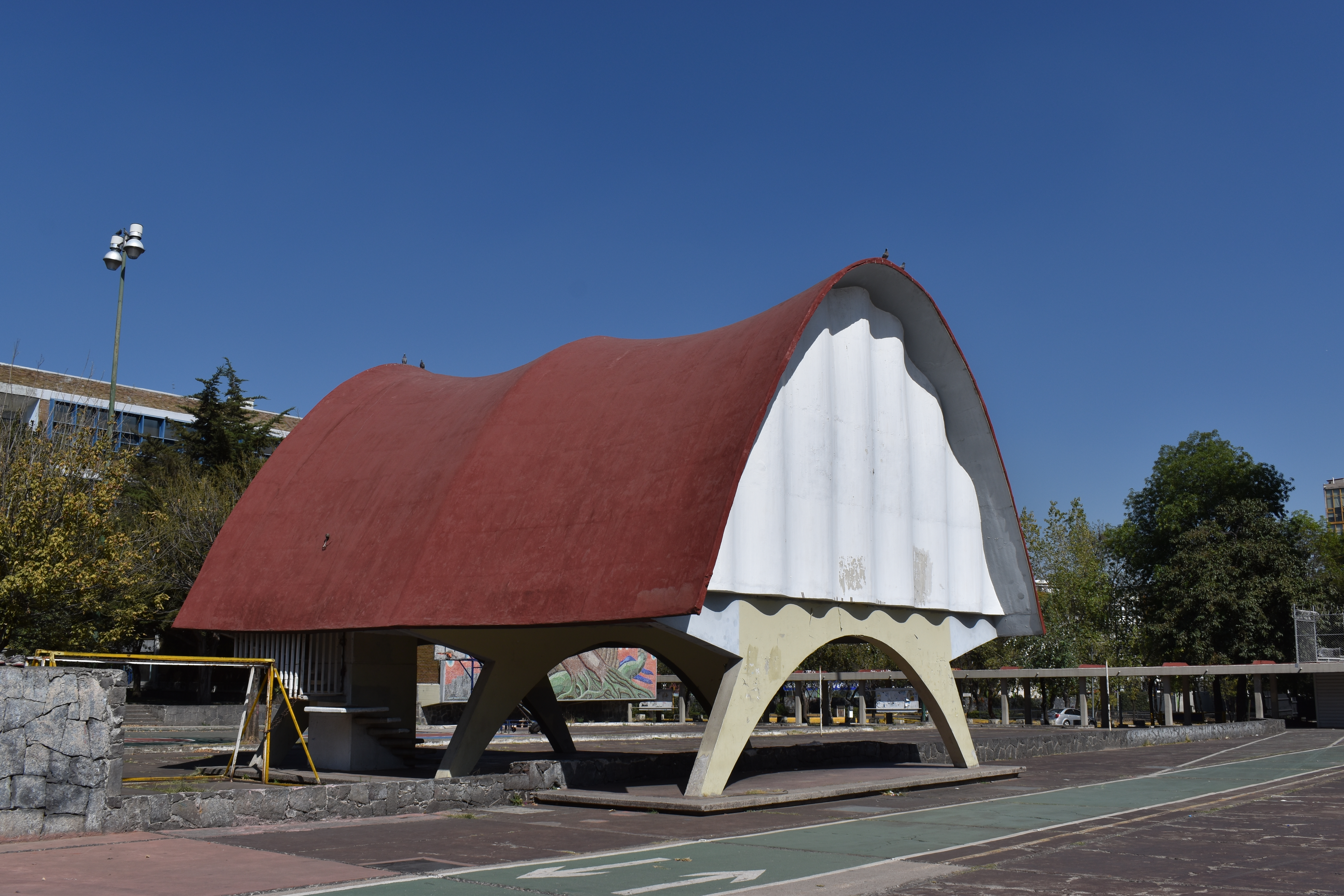
1951, Pabellón de Rayos Cósmicos ("Pavilion of Cosmic Rays"), National Autonomous University of Mexico, with Jorge González Reyna

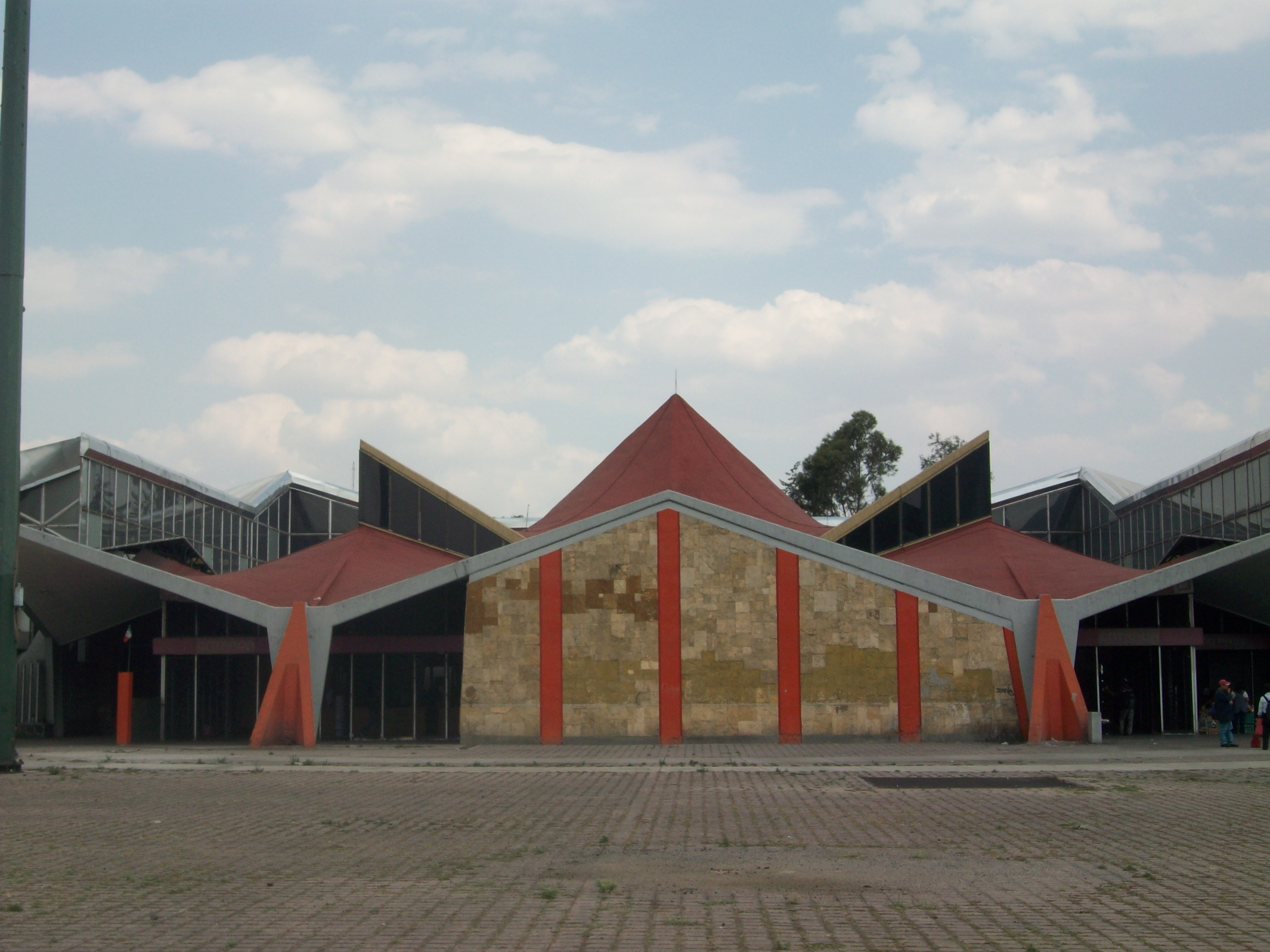
San Lázaro metro station, Mexico City

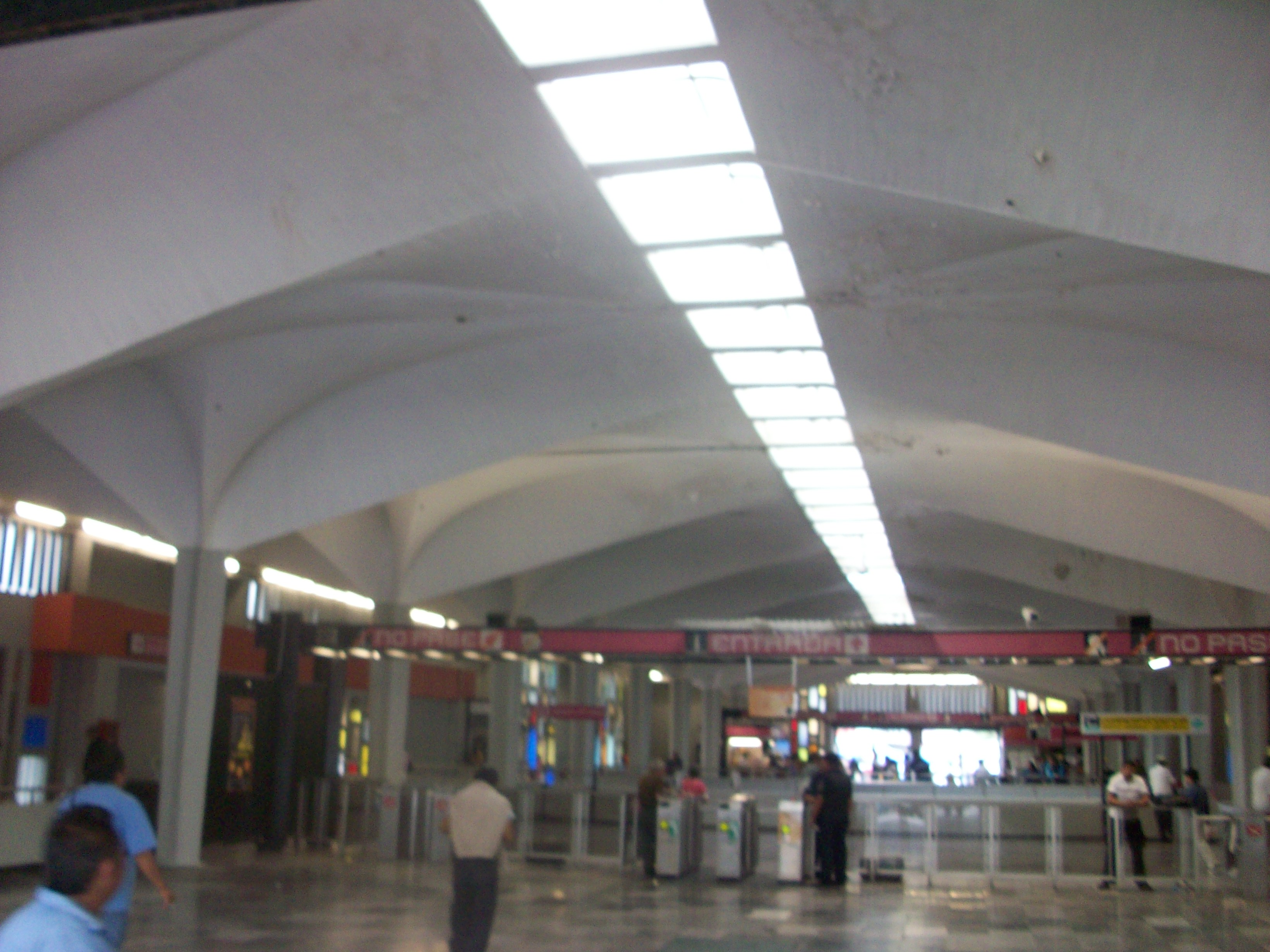
Roof of Candelaria metro station, Mexico City

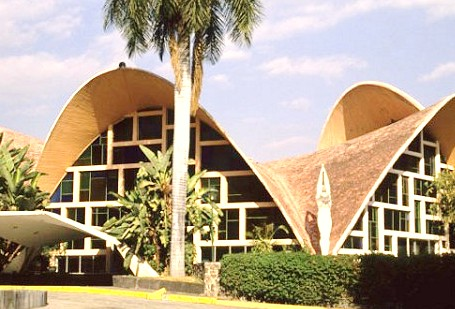
Restaurant of the Hotel Casino de la Selva, Cuernavaca, Mexico

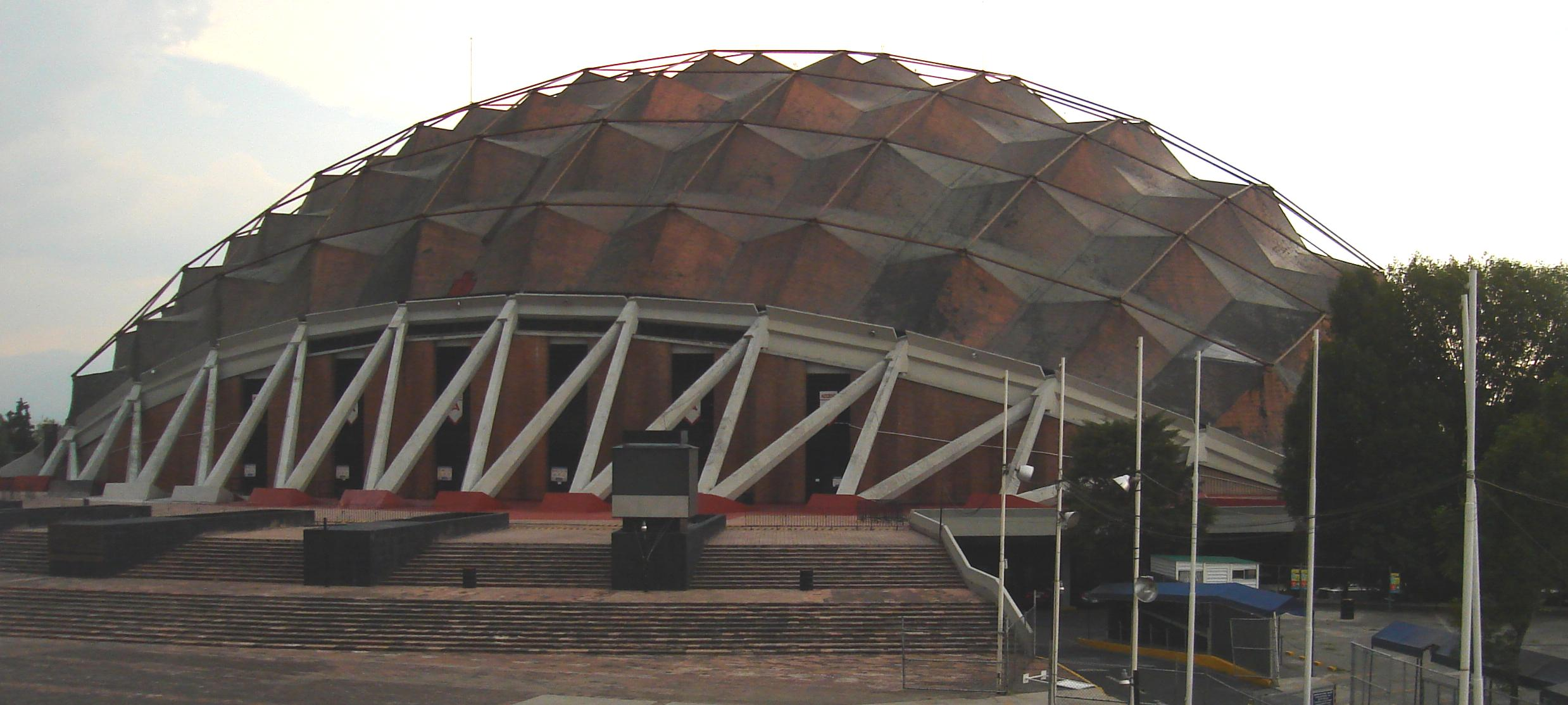
Palacio de los Deportes, Mexico City

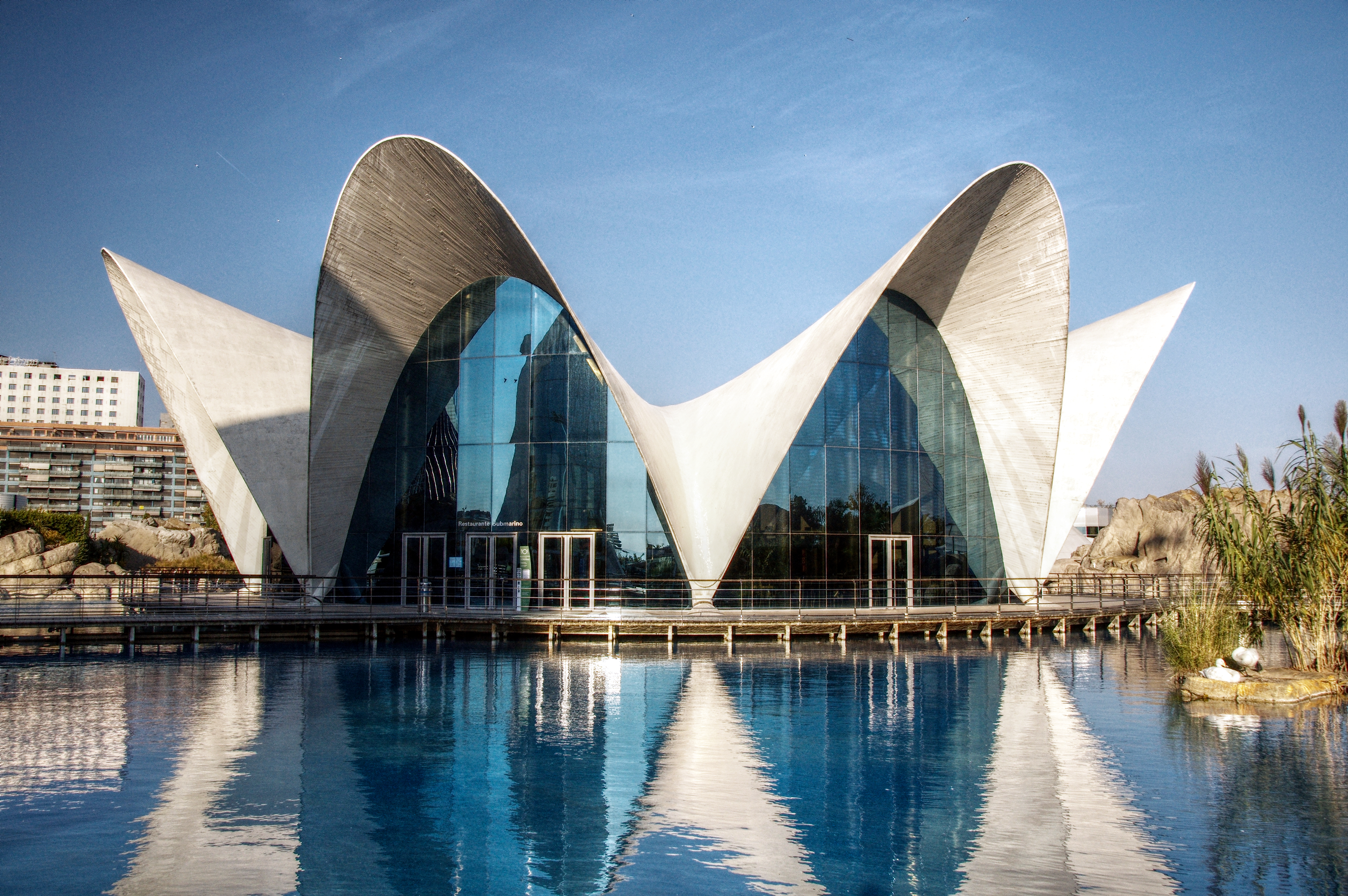
L'Oceanogràfic (El Oceanográfico), City of Arts and Sciences, Valencia, Spain, with Alberto Domingo and Carlos Lázaro.

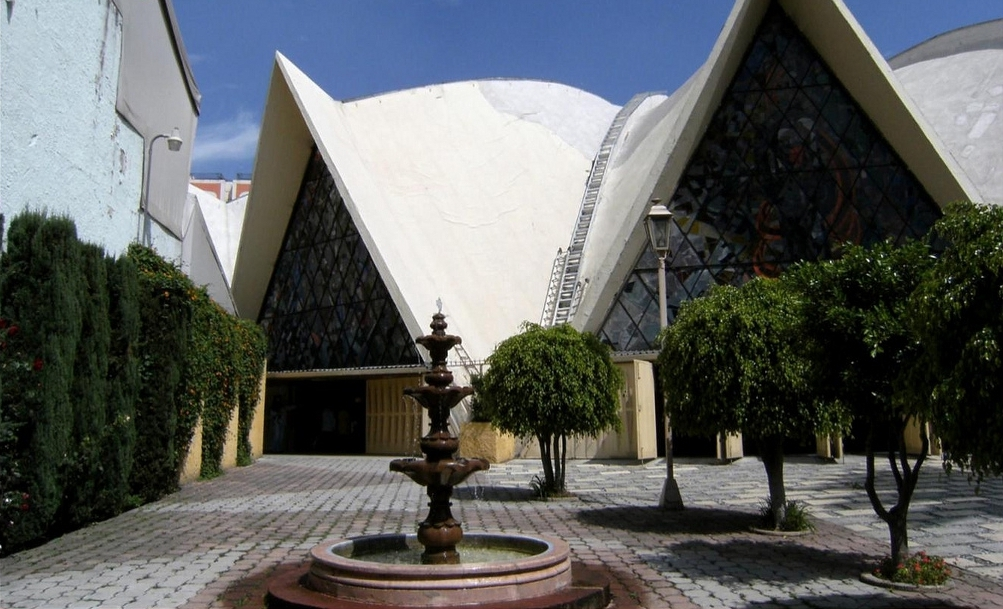
Templo de Santa Mónica in Colonia Del Valle, Mexico City

Félix Candela Outeriño (Spanish pronunciation: [ˈfeliɣs kanˈdela owteˈɾiɲo]; January 27, 1910 – December 7, 1997) was a Spanish and Mexican architect who was born in Madrid and, at the age of 29, emigrated to Mexico, acquiring Mexican nationality.

He is known for his significant role in the development of Mexican architecture and structural engineering. Candela's major contribution to architecture was the development of thin shells made out of reinforced concrete, popularly known as cascarones.

He was Santiago Calatrava's icon who has had a great influence on his works.

At the end of his career he worked with the architect Fernando Higueras, designing inverted umbrellas with 12-meter cantilevers, and with the young and innovative Emilio Pérez Piñero.

== Early life ==
Felix Candela was born in Madrid, Spain in 1910. In 1927 Candela enrolled in La Escuela Superior de Arquitectura (Madrid Superior Technical School of Architecture), graduating in 1935; at which time Candela traveled to Germany to further study architecture. Early after he started classes, he developed a very keen sense of geometry and started teaching other students in private lessons. In his junior year, his visual intelligence and his descriptive geometric and trigonometric talent helped him catch the eye of Luis Vegas. Vegas was his material strength professor, and gave Candela the honorary title of "Luis Vegas' Helper". While "helping" Vegas, Candela entered many architecture competitions and won most of them. Unlike many of his peers, Candela did not show intellectual or aesthetic efforts in school. He did not even like pure mathematics. When Candela was a student in Madrid, the schools taught the theory of elasticity where Candela assisted the professors and even tutored other students.

His studies ended very quickly when the Spanish civil war began in 1936. When Candela returned to Spain to fight, he sided with the republic and fought against Franco. Candela became a Captain of Engineers for the Spanish republic after a short period of time. Unfortunately, while participating in the civil war, Candela was imprisoned in the Perpignan Concentration camp in Perpignan, France until the end of the war in 1939. Candela had fought against Franco; therefore he could not stay in the new Spain as long as Franco was the head of state. After his name was selected with a few hundred other prisoners, Candela was put onto a ship bound for Mexico, where he would start his career. He landed in Acapulco later that year.

As an expert of paraboloid and hyperbolic geometry, he was drawn to experiment on a series of residential and commercial shell-shaped structures since the beginning of his career. Candela evaluated both the artistic and the cost-saving aspects of this kind of design choice.

Candela married Eladia Martin when he moved to Mexico from Spain; there, they raised a family. In his early life, Felix was active in sports, particularly rugby and skiing.

In 1967 Candela married Dorothy (Davies) Candela a draftsperson and interior designer originally from Detroit Michigan.

== Thin-shell structures ==
Candela worked very hard during his lifetime to prove the real nature and potential reinforced concrete had in structural engineering. Reinforced concrete is extremely efficient in a dome or shell like shape. This shape eliminates tensile forces in the concrete. He also looked to solve problems by the simplest means possible. In regard to shell design, he tended to rely on the geometric properties of the shell for analysis, instead of complex mathematical means and he followed the works of Eduardo Torroja in Europe and Guillermo Gonzalez Zuleta in America. Around 1950 when Candela's company went to design laminar structures, he started researching journals and engineering articles for as much information as he could find. From this, he started questioning the behaviour of reinforced concrete with the elastic assumptions and concluded they are in total disagreement with each other. (Faber 1963) Candela has said on more than one occasion that the analysis of a structure is a sort of "hobby" to him.

== Mexico: 1939–1968 ==
Félix Candela worked as an architect upon his arrival in Mexico until 1949 when he started to engineer many concrete structures utilizing his well-known thin-shell design. Candela did most of his work in Mexico throughout the 1950s and into the late 60s. He was responsible for more than 300 works and 900 projects in this time period. Many of his larger projects were given to him by the Mexican government, such as the Cosmic Rays Pavilion. In 1956, Mexican President Adolfo Ruiz Cortines said "Nothing could be more serious than to sit in the shade of the buildings we are about to build," foreshadowing the many construction projects to come. Ruiz Cortines came up with a budget to enable his construction declaration to come true, requesting ₱81,200,000 (pesos) more funding than was used in 1955. Luckily for Candela, ₱20,300,000 (pesos) of this funding was to go towards public works. Candela also benefited from the budget implemented by Ruiz Cortines in the area of education. Candela became a professor in Mexico, which is what he did for the remainder of his career. Felix moved to the United States and taught at University of Illinois at Chicago from 1971 to 1978.

== University of Illinois at Chicago Circle: 1971–1978 ==
Candela was hired as a Professor of Architecture at the university's Chicago Circle campus (now University of Illinois at Chicago) on September 1, 1971, a position he held until 1978.

Candela's teaching focusing on thin-shell concrete structures and hyperbolic paraboloid geometry as a way to integrate architectural form with structural efficiency. His teaching emphasized deriving design directly from material behavior and structural logic, encouraging students to treat engineering and architecture as a unified system of thinking. He was teaching in Chicago during a period when the city was deeply engaged in reinforced concrete experimentation in high-rise and institutional construction, which allowed his shell-based pedagogy to align closely with and reinforce the broader culture of structural innovation already underway..

== Works ==
Source: Fausto Giovannardi, ed.: Felix Candela, Builder of Dreams

- 1951, Pabellón de Rayos Cósmicos ("Pavilion of Cosmic Rays"), National Autonomous University of Mexico, with Jorge González Reyna
- 1952, Almacenes de las Aduanas (customs warehouses), Pantaco, Azcapotzalco, Mexico City, with Carlos Recamier
- 1953–1957 Iglesia de la Medalla de la Virgen Milagrosa, Colonia Narvarte, Mexico City
- 1954–1955 Fábrica Celestino Fernández, Colonia Vallejo, Mexico City
- 1955, covering for Mexican Stock Exchange, Mexico City, with Enrique de La Mora Lopez and Fernando Carmona
- 1955–1956 Quiosco de Música, Santa Fe.
- Churches in Mexico City: 1955 El Atillo church, Coyoacán; 1955 San Antonio de las Huertas, Tacuba; 1959 San Vicente de Paul, 1963 Santa Monica Lopez of Carmona; all with Enrique de La Mora y Palomar and Fernando Lopez Carmona
- 1955–56: Municipal markets in Coyoacán, Azcapotzalco and Anáhuac, Mexico City with Pedro Ramirez Vàzquez and Rafael Mijares
- 1956–1957 Nightclub La Jacaranda, Acapulco
- 1956: Hotel Casino de la Selva, Cuernavaca, Mexico (demolished 2001)
- 1958, Los Manatiales restaurant, Xochimilco, Mexico City, with Joaquín Álvarez Ordonez
- 1958, Chapel Lomas de Cuernavaca, Cuernavaca, Mexico
- 1959–1960, Planta embotelladora Bacardi, Cuautitlán, near Mexico City
- 1959, Capilla de Abierta Palmira in Cuernavaca with Rosell and Manuel Guillermo Larrosa
- 1959, San José Obrero church Monterrey, with Enrique de La Mora y Palomar and Fernando Lopez Carmona
- 1962, Aula Magna at The Anglo Mexican Foundation, with Enrique de La Mora Colonia San Rafael
- 1962-3, Church of Our Lady of Guadalupe in Madrid, with Enrique de La Mora y Palomar and Fernando Lopez Carmona
- 1963, John Lewis Warehouse (JLW) at Stevenage, UK
- 1966, Parroquia del Señor del Campo Florido, Mexico City
- 1968, Palacio de los Deportes, Mexico City, built for the 1968 Summer Olympics, with A. Peyri and E. Castañeda Tamborell
- 1969, Mexico City metro stations San Lázaro and Candelaria
- 1994–2002 L'Oceanogràfic, Valencia, Spain

== Archive ==
Candela's drawings, correspondence, personal and professional papers, and writings are held in the permanent collection of the Department of Drawings & Archives in the Avery Architectural and Fine Arts Library at Columbia University in New York City.
