= Guerrero earthquake =

This disambiguation page refers to earthquakes that have occurred in the Mexican state of Guerrero, including:

- 1787 New Spain earthquake – M_{w} 8.6 earthquake and tsunami affecting Guerrero.
- 1911 Guerrero earthquake
- 1957 Guerrero earthquake
- 1964 Guerrero earthquake
- 1979 Petatlán earthquake
- 1982 Ometepec earthquake
- 1995 Guerrero earthquake
- 2011 Guerrero earthquake
- 2012 Guerrero–Oaxaca earthquake
- 2014 Guerrero earthquake
- 2021 Guerrero earthquake
- 2026 Guerrero earthquake
