= Oaxaca earthquake =

Oaxaca earthquake may refer to several earthquakes in or around what is today the state of Oaxaca, Mexico:

- 1787 New Spain earthquake
- 1931 Oaxaca earthquake
- 1965 Oaxaca earthquake
- 1980 Oaxaca earthquake
- 1999 Oaxaca earthquake
- 2010 Oaxaca earthquake
- 2012 Guerrero–Oaxaca earthquake
- 2017 Chiapas earthquake
- 2018 Oaxaca earthquake
- 2020 Oaxaca earthquake
