= 2021 Guerrero earthquake =

7.0 magnitude earthquake in Mexico

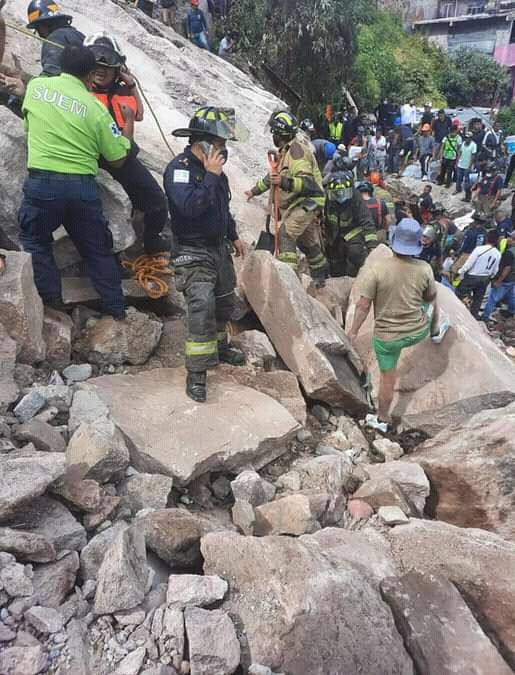
- Rescue workers attending to the scene of a landslide that occurred on 10 September in Cerro del Chiquihuite

- Location within Guerrero Location within Mexico
- UTC time: 2021-09-08 01:47:46
- ISC event: 621041919
- USGS-ANSS: ComCat
- Local date: September 7, 2021
- Local time: 20:47:46
- Magnitude: 7.0 M_{w} (USGS) 7.1 M_{w} (SSN)
- Depth: 20.0 km (12.4 mi) (USGS) 10.0 km (6.2 mi) (SSN)
- Epicenter: 16.982°N 99.773°W
- Type: Thrust
- Areas affected: Mexico
- Max. intensity: MMI VIII (Severe)
- Tsunami: 48 cm (1.6 ft)
- Landslides: 69
- Aftershocks: Many. Strongest is 4.9 M_{w}
- Casualties: 13 dead (3 direct, 6 in the aftermath, 4 indirect), 23+ injured

A moment magnitude M_{w}7.0 or 7.1 earthquake occurred near the city of Acapulco in the Mexican state of Guerrero at 20:47 local time on 7 September with an estimated intensity of VIII (Severe) on the MMI scale. The earthquake killed 13 people and injured at least 23 others. At least 1.6 million people in Mexico were affected by the earthquake which resulted in localized severe damage. The earthquake occurred on the anniversary of the 2017 Chiapas earthquake which measured M_{w}8.2. It was also the largest earthquake in Mexico since the 2020 Oaxaca earthquake.

== Tectonic setting ==
Mexico is one of the most seismically active regions in the world; located at the boundary of at least three tectonic plates. The west coast of Mexico lies at a convergent plate boundary between the Cocos plate and North American plate. The Cocos plate consists of denser oceanic lithosphere, subducts beneath the less dense continental crust of the North American plate. Most of the Mexican landmass is situated on the North American plate moving westward. Because the oceanic crust is relatively dense, when the bottom of the Pacific Ocean meets the lighter continental crust of the Mexican landmass, the ocean floor subducts beneath the North American plate creating the Middle America Trench along the southern coast of Mexico. Occasionally, the contact interface or subduction zone megathrust releases elastic strain during earthquakes. Large and sudden uplift of the seafloor can produce large tsunamis when such earthquakes occur.

== Earthquake ==
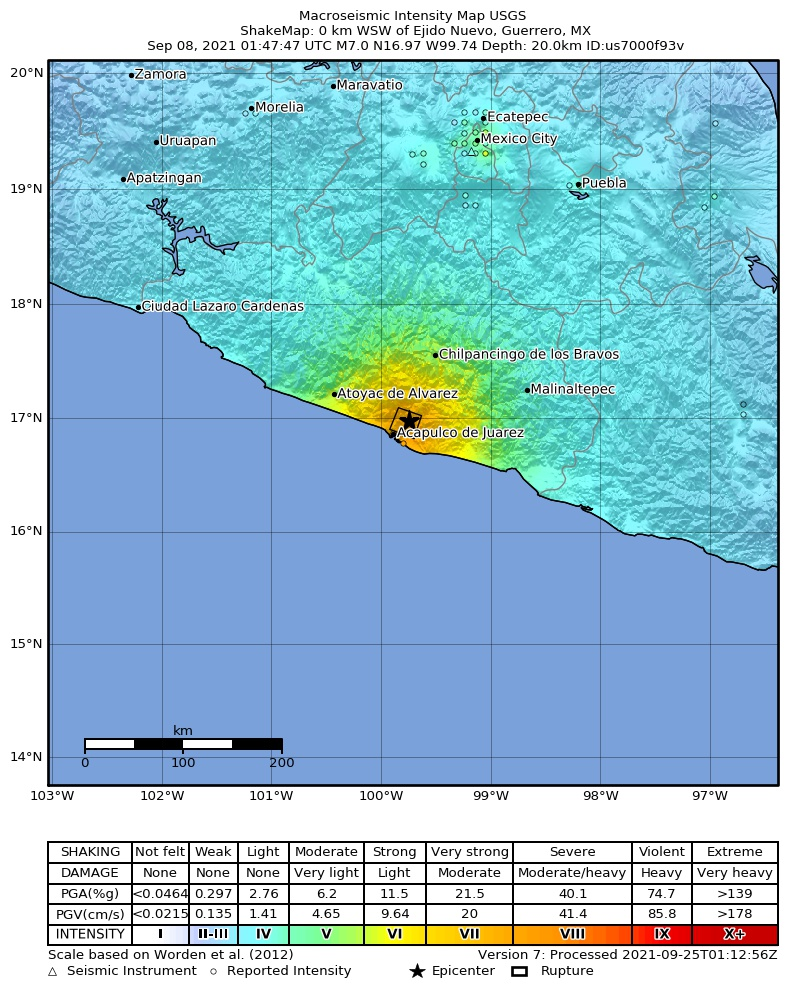
A USGS ShakeMap of the earthquake showing the different shaking intensity around the epicenter.

The earthquake was a thrust faulting event located on or near the subduction zone boundary of the Caribbean plate and Cocos plate. The earthquake was first measured at a magnitude of 7.4 by the USGS, however it was later downgraded to 7.0. The earthquake occurred at a relatively shallow depth, only 20 kilometres (12 mi) below the surface, which would have amplified the shaking effect. Earthquakes of this size according to the U.S. Geological Survey are 40 km × 20 km (25 mi × 12 mi) in rupture size.

The earthquake occurred at the southern extent of the Guerrero Gap. The Guerrero Gap is a seismic gap on the subduction boundary which stretches from Acapulco to Tecpán de Galeana for 230 km (140 mi). Many seismologists in Mexico were on alert after the event because it occurred in a region where no major earthquake have struck for over 110 years, therefore was designated as a seismic gap. The gap is capable of generating a magnitude 8.0 or greater earthquake, but a similar-sized event in 2014 ruptured the northern segment of the seismic gap, therefore the unbroken segment could only produce a magnitude 7.8, or multiple smaller earthquakes.

== Impact ==
At least 8,700 structures across 40 municipalities of Guerrero were damaged, affecting 15,000 people. At least 3,060 of them in rural communities.

According to the Guerrero Civil Protection Secretariat, 3,289 structures including at least 2,006 homes, 35 schools, 13 hospitals, six places of worship, and 13 hotels were damaged in Acapulco. In the city, located 3 kilometres (1.9 mi) from the epicenter, buildings swayed and there were reports of power outages and many gas leaks. Utility poles and church facades reportedly collapsed and damaged many cars along Costera Avenue. At least 51 buildings collapsed in the city. A total of 58 landslides occurred on a highway from Chilpancingo to Acapulco, and 11 from Chilpancingo to Iguala. Approximately 70 incidents of road collapses were reported, 58 of them between the cities Acapulco and Chilpancingo. Eleven reports of road collapses occurred on Mexican Federal Highway 95 from Iguala to Chilpancingo. At least 56 gas leaks were reported in Acapulco as well. Highways and homes were also partially buried under landslides and rockfalls. The earthquake generated panic in the city and drove many people out of hotels. Minor damage was discovered in terminal buildings at Acapulco International Airport, prompting the suspension of operations until 11:30 local time the following day. The air traffic control tower of the airport however, was seriously damaged when ceiling tiles and debris fell to the control room. The quake affected 43,000 businesses in Acapulco 4,800 of which remained closed. Many indigenous groups residing in the mountainous terrains of Guerrero were also affected.

More than 200 units at an apartment building in Diamante, Acapulco were abandoned by residents due to the extent of damage and fears that it was unsafe for occupancy. Another 26 buildings in the city were abandoned by residents, which spent the night sleeping on the streets. The retaining walls of a school in the Primero de Mayo neighborhood collapsed, exposing its foundations and putting the structure at risk of a total collapse. Rural settlements including Xaltianguis, Xolapa, Las Tortolitas, El Playón, La Sierrita, San José, Pablo Galeana, Las Marías, Agua Zarca and La Calera were affected by the quake, all reporting damage to homes and injuries. A luxury three-storey-home in the Punta Brava area of the city completely collapsed during the shaking.

The earthquake knocked over the large, 50-year-old Enterolobium cyclocarpum tree on José María Iglesias street, an iconic tourist attraction in the Acapulco. The collapse of the tree disrupted traffic flow when it fell onto the street. At least 10 public service workers removed the remains of the tree at 08:00 local time on September 8.

The Casona De Benito Juarez was another heritage center and tourist attraction that was severely affected by the quake. The building constructed in the pre-1950s suffered a complete collapse of one adobe wall and had some large cracks. Fragments of tile, mud, and stone which were used to construct the building were strewn on the ground after the quake.

In the Acatepec municipality, the quake damaged 824 homes, nine schools and one church.

At least 1.6 million customers in Mexico City and four other Mexican states lost access to electricity. Alarms sounded in Mexico City activated by the country's earthquake early warning system, giving residents several seconds of advanced warning before shaking would be felt. Power flashes and blackouts were reported in the Mexico City area, causing panic and residents to evacuate from their homes. Earthquake lights, a type of luminous aerial phenomenon, were also reported across several cities in the country.

In Mexico City, passengers on Cablebús gondola lifts were trapped on board for about an hour, as the system ceased operations during the earthquake.

=== Casualties ===
According to Héctor Astudillo, the governor of Guerrero, one person was killed in the town of Luces en el Mar in the Coyuca de Benítez municipality in a motorcycle accident and collision with a utility pole. One person also died of a cardiac arrest in Puebla. A third death was reported in Xaltianguis, Guerrero; the elderly woman was killed when a fence at a clinic she visited collapsed. Three additional deaths attributed to heart attacks were reported in Acapulco.

At least 20 people were injured in rural towns surrounding the Acapulco area during the quake. Two people were injured in San Gaspar de los Reyes, Metepec, when a wall collapsed on them while they were on a motorcycle. The injured pair were taken to a hospital in Metepec where they received treatment. In Orizaba, Veracruz, three people suffered nervous breakdowns when they were trapped in an elevator in the Regional General Hospital.

Two days after the earthquake, on September 9, a man was killed in a vehicle collision on the Acapulco-Pinotepa federal highway near Acapulco, affected by the quake.

A 14-year-old girl from Tortolitas died at the hospital where she was recovered, after succumbing to her injuries sustained when a wall collapsed.

On September 10, at 13:30 local time, a landslide occurred on the Cerro del Chiquihuite hill in Eastern Tlalnepantla de Baz, State of Mexico, killing two people and causing one injury. At least three people; a woman and her two children went missing in the immediate aftermath. The landslide brought large boulders which destroyed four homes and buried several others near the hillside. At least 80 residents were evacuated. According to the governor of the State of Mexico, Alfredo del Mazo Maza, heavy rainfall in the city, as well as the earthquake, weakened soil conditions on the hill, triggering the landslide. On September 15, the missing three-year-old girl was found dead. The bodies of the mother and the other child were recovered were found under the landslide on September 22.

== Tsunami ==
Approximately ten minutes after the quake struck, the Pacific Tsunami Warning Center initially issued a tsunami threat message for the earthquake which had a preliminary magnitude of M_{w}7.4 at 50 km depth. A small tsunami measuring 1.2 feet (0.37 m) was recorded in Acapulco at 01:54 UTC, five minutes after the mainshock. The same observation station observed a tsunami up to 48 centimeters at 02:04. The tsunami threat was called off by the Pacific Tsunami Warning Center at 03:39 UTC.

== Response ==
The mayor of Acapulco, Adela Román, has urged residents to remain calm while the situation was being assessed.

Authorities in Guerrero requested a Declaration of Disaster for the area in response to the earthquake. The Declaration of Disaster status was granted later on September 9.

== See also ==
- List of earthquakes in 2021
- List of earthquakes in Mexico
- 1911 Guerrero earthquake
- 1979 Petatlán earthquake
- 1852 Acapulco earthquake
