= Timeline of Acapulco =

The following is a timeline of the history of the city of Acapulco de Juárez, Guerrero, Mexico.

== Prior to 20th century ==
- 1550
  - Acapulco town established by Fernando de Santa Ana.
  - Pedro Pacheco becomes mayor.
- 1565 – October: Spanish galleon San Pedro of Andrés de Urdaneta arrives from the Philippines in the first ever eastward voyage across the Pacific.
- 1570s – Hospital de Nuestra Señora de la Consolación built (approximate date).
- 1576 – Epidemic outbreak.
- 1597 – Spanish colonial bureau of accounts established.
- 1614 – January: Japanese ship Mutsu Maru arrives; passengers include Hasekura Tsunenaga.
- 1615
  - Acapulco-Manila galleon trade begins.
  - October: Dutch Joris van Spilbergen expedition passes through.
- 1616 – Fort of San Diego built.
- 1617 – Fortín Álvarez built.
- 1624 – October: Fuerte de San Diego taken briefly by Dutch.
- 1627 – Customs building constructed.
- 1776 – 21 April: Earthquake.
- 1783 – Fort of San Diego rebuilt.
- 1799 – Town becomes a city: "Ciudad de los Reyes de Acapulco."
- 1803 – March: German scientist Alexander von Humboldt visits Acapulco.
- 1810–1811 – City besieged by forces of José María Morelos during the Mexican War of Independence.
- 1813 – April: Siege of Acapulco (1813); Morelos in power.
- 1814 – City burnt per order of Morelos.
- 1852 – 1852 Acapulco earthquake totally destroys the city.

== 20th century ==
- 1907 – April: Earthquake.
- 1909 – 30 July: Brecha de Guerrero earthquake.
- 1919 – Workers Party of Acapulco founded.
- 1930 – Population: 6,529.
- 1934 – Salón Rojo cinema opens on Plaza Álvarez.
- 1949 – Avenida Costera Miguel Alemán (street) opens.
- 1950s – Catedral de Nuestra Señora de la Soledad de Acapulco built.
- 1954 – Cine Tropical opens (approximate date).
- 1955 – Mexican Air Force 7th Military Air Base established.
- 1958 – Roman Catholic diocese of Acapulco established.
- 1959 – Jorge Joseph Piedra becomes mayor.
- 1960 – Population: 49,149.
- 1967 – Aéroport international général Juan N. Álvarez in operation.
- 1969
  - Mercado Central de Acapulco built.
  - Novedades Acapulco newspaper in publication.
  - Sister city relationship established with Manila, Philippines.
- 1970 – Population: 174,378.
- 1971 – Capilla Ecuménica La Paz (chapel) opens.
- 1973
  - Acapulco Convention Center opens.
  - Internacional de Acapulco Fútbol Club formed.
- 1975
  - Unidad Deportiva Acapulco (athletic facility) and Condominio Torres Gemelas built.
  - Instituto Tecnológico de Acapulco established.
- 1978
  - Miss Universe 1978 Pageant is held at the Teotihuacan Forum of the Acapulco Convention Center
- 1980 – Population: 301,902.
- 1981
  - Parque Papagayo (park) opens.
  - Crowne Plaza Acapulco built.
- 1985 – Fictional telenovela Tú o nadie broadcast (set in Acapulco).
- 1986 – Museo Histórico de Acapulco (museum) established.
- 1987 – Rio Group meets in city.
- 1988 – Torre Coral built.
- 1991 – Festival Acapulco begins.
- 1992 – Universidad Loyola del Pacífico established.
- 1993 – Mexican Federal Highway 95D (Mexico City-Acapulco highway) begins operating.
- 1995 – Population: 592,528.
- 1997
  - June: Acapulco Black Film Festival begins.
  - October: Hurricane Pauline.
- 1999 – Casa de la Máscara (museum) opens.
- 2000 – Population: 620,656.

== 21st century ==
- 2005 – June: Guerrero police chief killed.
- 2008
  - 5 October: Guerrero state election, 2008 held.
  - Mundo Imperial tourist resort and its Forum de Mundo Imperial (stadium) open.
  - La Isla Acapulco Shopping Village in business.
- 2010 – Population: 673,479 in city; 863,431 in Acapulco metropolitan area.
- 2011 – 30 January: Guerrero state election, 2011 held.
- 5 May 2011: 2011 Guerrero earthquake
- 2012
  - 24 March: Verónica Escobar Romo becomes mayor.
  - 1 July: Acapulco municipal election, 2012 held; Luis Walton wins.
  - Acabús (public transit) construction and Acapulco Imperial Mega Fair begin.
- 2013 – September: Hurricane Manuel.
- 2015 – Luis Uruñuela Fey becomes mayor.
- 2018 – 7 May: Anti-crime clown protest.
- 2021 – 17 September: 2021 Guerrero earthquake
- 2023 – October: Hurricane Otis.

== See also ==
- Acapulco history
- History of Guerrero
  - History of Guerrero state (in Spanish)
- List of municipal presidents of Acapulco

== Bibliography ==
=== In English ===
Published in 18th–19th centuries

- Jedidiah Morse (1797), "Acapulco", The American Gazetteer, Boston, Massachusetts: At the presses of S. Hall, and Thomas & Andrews
- Josiah Conder (1830), "Acapulco", Mexico and Guatimala, The Modern Traveller, vol. 25, London: J.Duncan
- Charles Knight, ed. (1866). "Acapulco". Geography. English Cyclopaedia. Vol. 1. London: Bradbury, Evans, & Co. hdl:2027/nyp.33433000064786.
- John Ramsay McCulloch (1875), "Acapulco", A Dictionary, Practical, Theoretical, and Historical, of Commerce and Commercial Navigation, London: Longmans, Green, hdl:2027/njp.32101079877088
- Henry Moore (1894), "Commercial Directory: Acapulco", Railway Guide of the Republic of Mexico, Springfield, Ohio: Huben & Moore, OCLC 22498265

Published in the 20th century

- Reau Campbell (1909), "Acapulco", Campbell's New Revised Complete Guide and Descriptive Book of Mexico, Chicago: Rogers & Smith Co., OCLC 1667015
- "Acapulco" . Encyclopædia Britannica. Vol. 1 (11th ed.). 1910. pp. 110–111.
- William Lytle Schurz (1918). "Acapulco and the Manila Galleon". Southwestern Historical Quarterly. 22. hdl:2027/njp.32101077272498.
- Ernst B. Filsinger (1922), "Mexico: Acapulco", Commercial Travelers' Guide to Latin America, Washington, DC: Government Printing Office
- Engel Sluiter (1949). "Fortification of Acapulco, 1615–1616". Hispanic American Historical Review. 29 (1): 69–80. doi:10.1215/00182168-29.1.69. JSTOR 2508294.
- Baedeker's Mexico, Baedekers Guides, 1994, p. 123+, OL 11077410M (fulltext via OpenLibrary)
- John Fisher (1999), "Acapulco", Mexico, Rough Guides (4th ed.), London, p. 376+, OL 24935876M

Published in the 21st century

- Stephen R. Niblo and Diane M. Niblo (2008). "Acapulco in Dreams and Reality". Mexican Studies. 24 (1): 31–51. doi:10.1525/msem.2008.24.1.31. JSTOR 10.1525/msem.2008.24.1.31.
- David Marley (2005), "Acapulco", Historic Cities of the Americas, vol. 1, Santa Barbara, California: ABC-CLIO, pp. 209–218, ISBN 1576070271

=== In Spanish ===
- Antonio García Cubas [in Spanish] (1896). "Acapulco". Diccionario Geográfico, Histórico y Biográfico de los Estados Unidos Mexicanos (in Spanish). Vol. 1. México: Antigua Imprenta de las Escalerillas. hdl:2027/coo.31924020385047.
- "Plan Municipal de Desarrollo 2012–2015", Gobierno Municipal de Acapulco (in Spanish), Ayuntamiento de Acapulco
