= List of earthquakes in Mexico =

Map of earthquakes in Mexico from 1900 to 2022

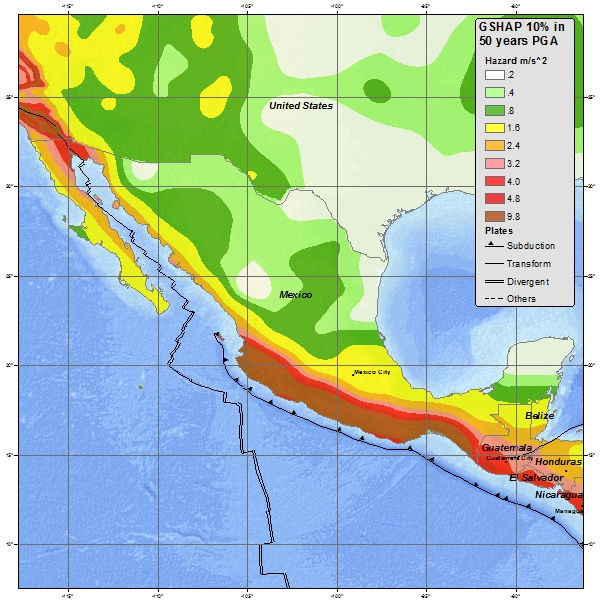
Seismic hazard risk in Mexico

Location of M 8.0+ earthquakes in Mexico with year of occurrence

This is a partial list of earthquakes in Mexico. This list considers every notable earthquake felt or with its epicenter within Mexico's current borders and maritime areas.

== Geology ==
Mexico lies within two seismically active earthquake zones. The Baja California peninsula lies near the boundary of the Pacific plate and the North American plate, while southern Mexico lies just north of the boundary between the North American plate and the Cocos and Rivera tectonic plates. The Cocos plate is subducting under the North American plate at a rate of 67 mm (0.220 ft) per year, while the Pacific and Rivera plates are moving northwest relative to the North American plate. Southern Mexico also contains numerous faults, which causes that section of the country to have high tectonic activity. Northeastern Mexico and the Yucatan Peninsula are not as seismically active as the area close to the boundary between the North American and Cocos plates, but destructive earthquakes can still occur in those areas.

== Earthquakes ==
Date	Area	Mag.	MMI	Deaths	Injuries	Total damage / notes	Ref
2026-07-17	Chiapas	7.3 M_{w}	VII		19	Minor damage	
2026-01-02	Guerrero	6.5 M_{w}	VII	2	24	Severe damage	
2022-09-22	Michoacán	6.8 M_{w}	VII	3	5	Aftershock	
2022-09-19	Michoacán	7.6 M_{w}	VIII	2	35	Severe damage	
2022-06-21	Jalisco	2.4 M_{w}				Severe damage	
2022-03-03	Veracruz	5.7 M_{w}	IV			Minor damage	
2021-09-07	Guerrero	7.0 M_{w}	VIII	13	23	Three missing, damage to 8,700 buildings	
2020-06-23	Oaxaca	7.4 M_{w}	IX	10	25		
2018-02-16	Oaxaca	7.2 M_{w}	VII	14	17	Most of casualties after a helicopter crash	
2017-09-23	Oaxaca	6.1 M_{w}	VII	6	7	7,000 displaced	
2017-09-19	Mexico City, Morelos, Puebla	7.1 M_{w}	IX	370	6,011		
2017-09-07	Chiapas, Oaxaca	8.2 M_{w}	IX	98	300	Tsunami	
2015-11-23	Guerrero	5.5 M_{w}	IV	2			
2014-07-07	Chiapas	6.9 M_{w}	VII	5	12		
2014-05-08	Guerrero	6.6 M_{w}	VII				
2014-04-18	Guerrero	7.2 M_{w}	VII		1		
2012-03-20	Guerrero, Oaxaca	7.4 M_{w}	VIII	2	11		
2011-12-10	Guerrero	6.5 M_{w}	VII	3	10		
2011-05-05	Guerrero	5.7 M_{w}	VI				
2010-06-30	Oaxaca	6.2 M_{w}		1			
2010-04-04	Baja California	7.2 M_{w}	VII	2–4	100–233	$1.15 billion	
2009-04-27	Guerrero	5.8 M_{w}	V	3		Four houses destroyed	
2003-01-22	Colima	7.5 M_{w}	VIII	29	300	Severe / tsunami	
1999-12-29	Guerrero	5.9 M_{w}	V		1	Minor damage	
1999-09-30	Oaxaca	7.4 M_{w}	VIII	35			
1999-06-15	Puebla	7.0 M_{w}	VIII	14	200	MXN $200,000,000	
1997-01-11	Michoacán	7.2 M_{w}	VIII	1		Damage at Arteaga	
1995-10-21	Chiapas	7.1 M_{w}	VI				
1995-10-09	Colima, Jalisco	8.0 M_{w}	VIII	49–58	100	Tsunami	
1995-09-14	Guerrero	7.4 M_{w}	VII	3			
1989-04-25	Guerrero	6.9 M_{w}	VII	3	6–350		
1985-09-19	Michoacán, Mexico City	8.0 M_{w}	IX	5,000–45,000	30,000	Extreme / tsunami	
1981-10-25	Michoacán	7.2 M_{w}	VIII	3			
1980-10-24	Oaxaca	7.2 M_{w}	IX	65–300+	Many	$5 million	
1979-10-15	Baja California	6.4 M_{w}	IX		91		
1979-03-14	Guerrero	7.6 M_{w}	VIII	5	35		
1978-11-29	Oaxaca, Mexico City	7.8 M_{w}	VIII	9		Severe	
1973-08-28	Puebla, Veracruz	7.1 M_{L}	VIII	539–1,000	Thousands	Severe	
1973-01-30	Colima	7.5 M_{s}		56	390	Moderate / non-destructive tsunami	
1968-08-02	Guerrero, Oaxaca	7.3	VII				
1965-08-23	Oaxaca	7.5 M_{w}		6			
1964-07-06	Guerrero	7.4 M_{s}	IX	40			
1959-08-26	Veracruz	6.4 M_{w}	VIII	25	200	Severe	
1957-07-28	Guerrero, Mexico City	7.9 M_{s}	VII	54–160	Many	Extreme / tsunami	
1941-04-15	Colima	7.6 M_{w}	IX	90			
1937-07-26	Puebla, Veracruz	7.3 M_{s}	IX	34			
1932-06-22	Colima	7.7 M_{w}	VIII			Tsunami	
1932-06-18	Colima	7.8 M_{w}	VIII			Tsunami	
1932-06-03	Jalisco	8.1 M_{w}	X	400		Tsunami	
1931-01-15	Oaxaca	7.8 M_{w}	X	114			
1920-01-03	Puebla, Veracruz	6.4 M_{s}	X–XII	648–4,000	167		
1912-11-19	State of Mexico	7.0	VIII	140			
1911-12-16	Guerrero	7.6	IX				
1911-06-07	Michoacán	7.6	IX	45			
1909-07-30	Guerrero	7.6	IX				
1907-04-15	Guerrero	7.7	VIII				
1900-01-20	Colima	7.4	VII				
1899-01-24	Guerrero	7.5	VII				
1897-06-05	Oaxaca	7.4	VII				
1894-11-02	Guerrero, Oaxaca	7.4	VIII				
1892-02-24	Baja California	7.1–7.2	X	0			
1890-12-02	Guerrero, Oaxaca	7.3	VII				
1889-09-06	Guerrero	7.1	VI				
1887-05-29	Guerrero	7.3	VIII				
1887-05-03	Sonora	7.6 M_{w}		51			
1882-07-19	Guerrero, Oaxaca	7.5	IX				
1879-05-17	Puebla	7.1	VIII				
1875-03-09	Colima, Jalisco	7.4	VII				
1875-02-11	Jalisco	7.5	VIII				
1874-03-16	Guerrero	7.3	VII				
1872-03-27	Oaxaca	7.4	VI				
1870-05-11	Oaxaca	7.8	IX				
1864-10-03	Puebla, Veracruz	7.3	VIII				
1858-06-19	Michoacán	7.5	IX			"Temblor de Santa Juliana"	
1854-05-05	Oaxaca	7.7	VIII				
1852-12-04	Acapulco	7.8					
1845-04-07	Guerrero	7.9 M_{s}				"Temblor de Santa Teresa"	
1852-11-29	Baja California	6.5 M_{La}	IX				
1845-03-09	Oaxaca	7.5	VII				
1837-11-22	Jalisco	7.7	IX				
1835-01-06	State of Mexico		VII?				
1820-05-04	Guerrero	7.6	VII				
1818-05-31	Colima, Michoacán	7.7	VIII				
1806-03-25	Colima, Michoacán	7.5 M_{s}					
1800-03-08	Central, Eastern, and Southeastern		VII				
1787-03-28	Guerrero, Oaxaca, Mexico City	8.6 M_{w}				Severe / tsunami	
1776-04-21	Mexico City, Southern		VIII				
Stover & Coffman 1993 uses various seismic scales. M_{La} is a local magnitude that is equivalent to M_{L} (Richter scale) and is used for events that occurred prior to the instrumental period. It is based on the area of perceptibility (as presented on isoseismal maps). M_{w} = moment magnitude scale and M_{s} = surface-wave magnitude. The inclusion criteria for adding events are based on WikiProject Earthquakes' notability guideline that was developed for stand alone articles. The principles described are also applicable to lists. In summary, only damaging, injurious, or deadly events should be recorded.

== See also ==
- Geography of Mexico
