= 2017 Puebla earthquake =

Magnitude 7.1 earthquake in Mexico

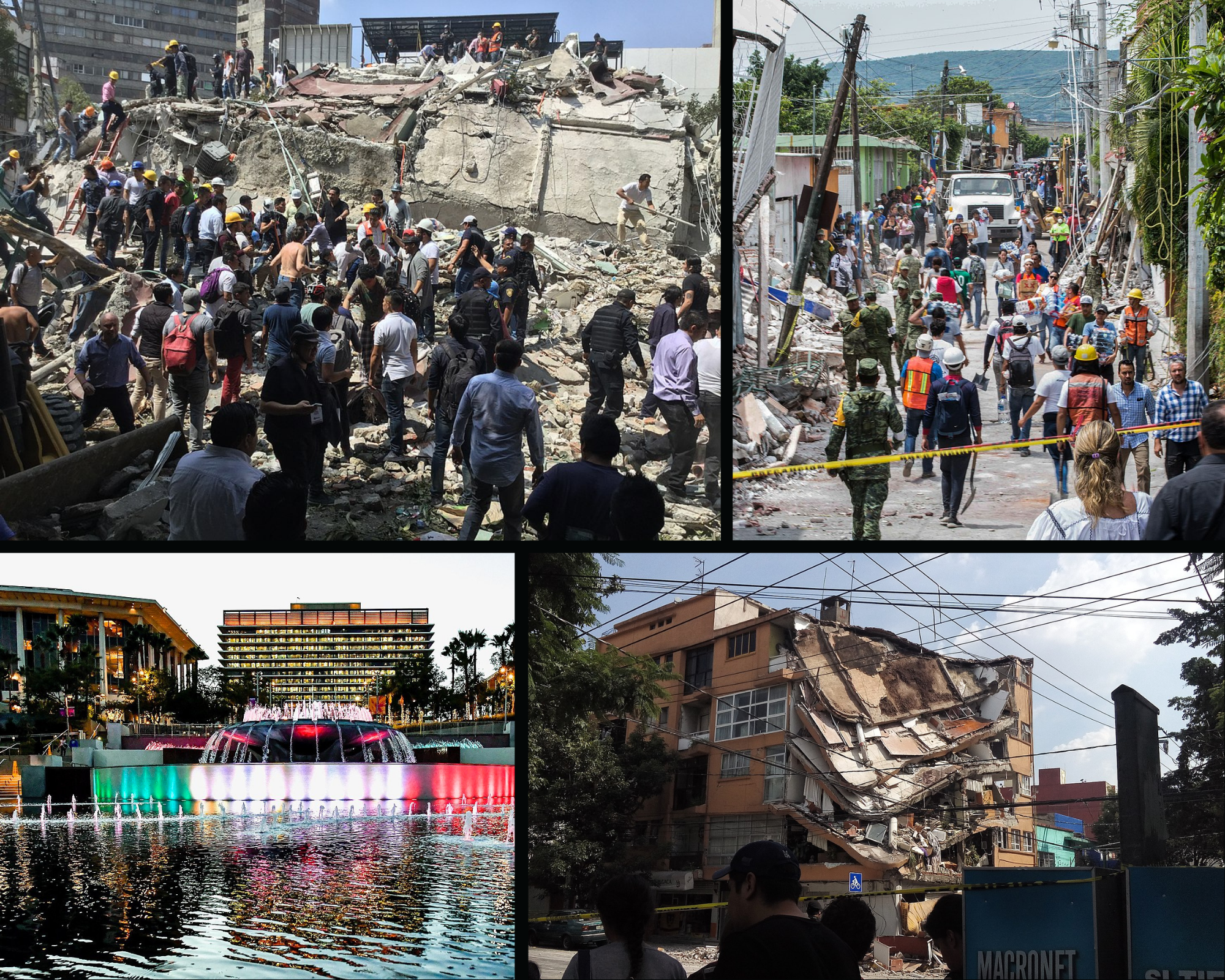
- Clockwise from top left: Citizens helping to remove debris from a collapsed building in Mexico City; Major damage in the Morelos municipality of Jojutla; A partially collapsed building in Mexico City; The Grand Park fountain in Los Angeles is lit up in the colors of the Mexican flag in recognition of the victims of the earthquake.

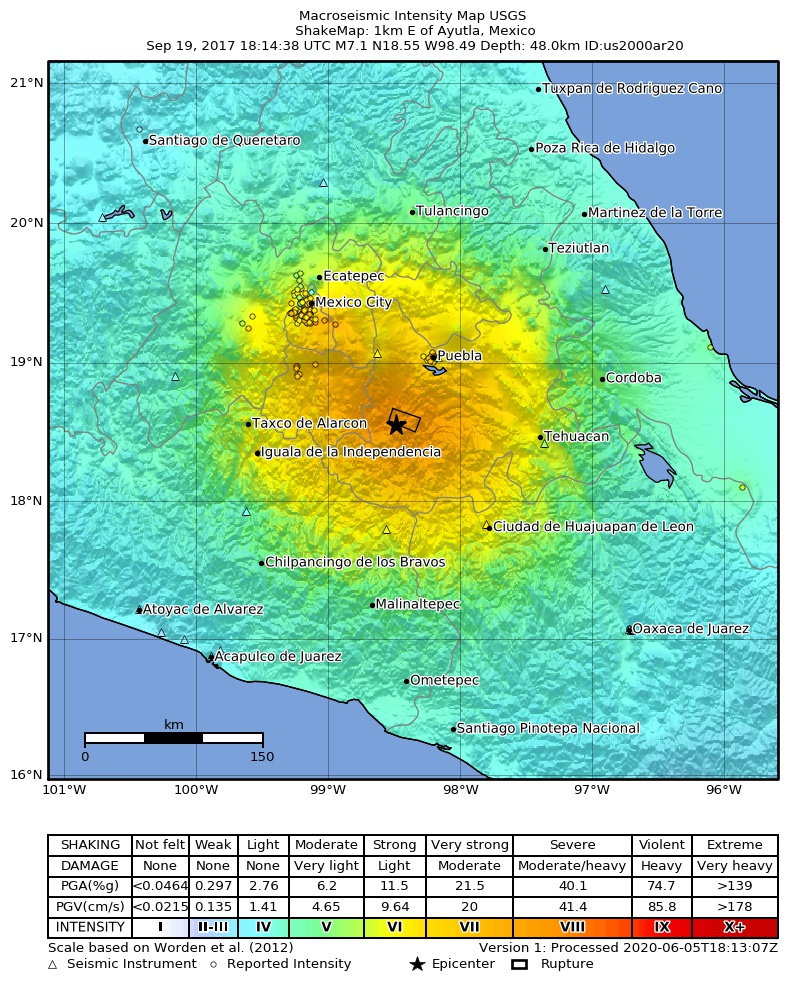

- Location within Mexico
- UTC time: 2017-09-19 18:14:40
- ISC event: 611079453
- USGS-ANSS: ComCat
- Local date: 19 September 2017
- Local time: 13:14:40 CDT
- Duration: Strong shaking for about 20 seconds
- Magnitude: 7.1 M_{w}
- Depth: 48.0 km (30 mi)
- Epicenter: 18.584°N 98.399°W
- Type: Dip-slip (normal)
- Total damage: $8 billion USD
- Max. intensity: MMI IX (Violent)
- Peak acceleration: 0.114 g
- Aftershocks: 39 (as of 12:30 23 September 2017 CDT)
- Casualties: 370 dead, 6,011 injured

The 2017 Puebla earthquake, also known as 19S, struck at 13:14 CDT (18:14 UTC) on 19 September 2017 with an estimated magnitude of 7.1 M_{w} and strong shaking for about 20 seconds. Its epicenter was about 55 km (34 mi) south of the city of Puebla, Mexico. The earthquake caused damage in the Mexican states of Puebla and Morelos and in the Greater Mexico City area, including the collapse of more than 40 buildings. 370 people were killed by the earthquake and related building collapses, including 228 in Mexico City, and more than 6,000 were injured.

The quake coincidentally occurred on the 32nd anniversary of the 1985 Mexico City earthquake, which killed around 10,000 people. The 1985 quake was commemorated, and a national earthquake drill was held, at 11 a.m. local time, just two hours before the 2017 earthquake. Twelve days earlier, the even larger 2017 Chiapas earthquake struck 650 km (400 mi) away, off the coast of the state of Chiapas.

== Background ==
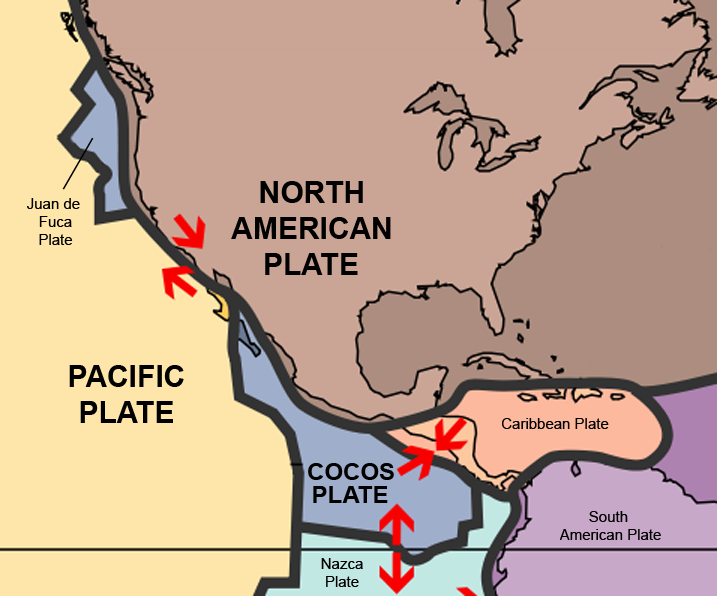
Tectonic plates of Mexico. Visible in the image is most of the North American continent, along with Central America. Mexico is located in the lower middle part of the picture, to the right of the Cocos plate.

Mexico is one of the world's most seismically active regions, sitting atop several intersecting tectonic plates. The border between the Cocos plate and North American plate, along the Pacific Coast of Mexico, creates a subduction zone that generates large seismic events. Activity along the edges of the Rivera and Caribbean plates also generate seismic events. All together, these seismic forces cause an average of 40 earthquakes a day in Mexico.

Mexico City is built on a dry lakebed with soft soil made up of sand and clay, which amplifies the destruction that major earthquakes cause. Loose sediments near the surface slow the shockwaves' speed from about 2.4 kilometres per second (8,600 km/h; 1.5 mi/s) to roughly 45 metres per second (160 km/h; 150 ft/s). This increases the shockwaves' amplitude, which causes more violent shaking. Deeper and denser soil layers increase amplified shockwaves' destructive duration.

Less than two weeks before the Puebla earthquake, Mexico had been struck by an earthquake in Chiapas on 7 September, which killed almost 100 people. Despite its close timing, the Puebla earthquake was not an aftershock of the Chiapas event, as the epicenters were 650 km (400 mi) apart.

The possibility of a link between the earthquakes was being investigated in the days after the second one. Big earthquakes can increase the long-term risk of seismic activity by transferring "static stress" to adjacent faults, but only at a distance of up to four times the length of the original rupture. In the 19 September earthquake, static stress transfer was considered unlikely due to the distance between the earthquakes, in excess of the expected 400 km maximum. "Dynamic triggering", with seismic waves propagating from one quake affecting other faults, may operate at much longer distances, but usually happens within hours or a few days of the triggering quake; a 12-day gap is hard to explain.

19 September is designated as a day of remembrance for the 1985 Mexico City earthquake, which killed approximately 10,000 people. Every year at 11 a.m., a national earthquake drill is conducted by the government through the use of public loudspeakers located throughout Mexico City. The 2017 drill took place as scheduled, at 11 a.m., around two hours before the central Mexico earthquake.

== Earthquake ==
Video after the earthquake in Mexico City

According to the National Seismological Service (SSN) of Mexico, the epicenter was located 12 km (7.5 mi) southeast of Axochiapan, Morelos, and 120 km (75 mi) from Mexico City. The earthquake was measured at a magnitude of 7.1, occurring at 13:14:40 Central Daylight Time, at a depth of 48 km (30 mi). The United States Geological Survey (USGS) placed the epicenter 5 km (3.1 mi) ENE of San Juan Raboso and reported a measurement of VIII (Severe) on the Mercalli intensity scale. Post-earthquake surveys indicated a maximum intensity of IX (Violent) near the epicenter region. While there was a report of strong shaking for about one minute, which is a long time for an earthquake, acceleration/velocity/displacement seismograms at UNAM showed about 20 seconds of strong shaking with a period of ≈1 second. SSN reported a peak ground acceleration of 112 cm/s^{2} (0.114 g_{0}) at the Popocatépetl reporting station in Tlamacas, Estado de México. According to the USGS, the earthquake occurred on a moderately dipping normal fault.

According to the bulletin of Mexico's SASMEX earthquake warning system, 20 seconds' advance warning was given in Mexico City; however the general experience in the capital was that the alarm and cellphone alerts started only a few seconds before, or during the quake. Some residents reportedly mistook the alert for a continuation of the earlier drill. 25 of the early-warning seismic sensors detected the earthquake, and alerts were also provided to Oaxaca, Acapulco, Chilpancingo, and Puebla, with lead times stated to range from 12 to 48 seconds.

== Casualties ==
Deaths as of 2 October 2017
State	Deaths	Ref
Guerrero	6	
Morelos	75	
Oaxaca	1	
Puebla	45	
State of Mexico	15	
Mexico City	228	
Totals:	370	

Nine days after the earthquake, at least 361 people had been reported killed. At least 74 people were killed in the state of Morelos, 220 in Mexico City, 45 in Puebla, 13 in the State of Mexico, 6 in the state of Guerrero and one in the state of Oaxaca. In Mexico City, the bodies of 26 students and four instructors were pulled from the rubble of the Enrique C. Rébsamen school; 30 students and 8 adults were still unaccounted for as of the evening of 19 September. The Mexico City campus of the Monterrey Institute of Technology and Higher Education suffered damage, with at least 5 people killed and 40 injured.

More than 6,000 people had been reported injured by the day after the earthquake, with more than 300 confirmed dead as rescue efforts continued.

On 1 October the number of people known to have been killed was stated to be 361, with more than 4,500 injured. By place, 220 were killed in Mexico City, 74 in the state of Morelos, 45 in Puebla, 15 in Mexico State, six in Guerrero, and one in Oaxaca.

An investigation published in October 2017 revealed that since 2012 there had been over 6,000 complaints about construction violations in Mexico City, with no public record of how many were followed up. Many of the buildings complained about collapsed in the 19 September earthquake. After the earthquake the Urban Development and Housing Secretariat (Seduvi) did not respond to requests for information on responses to complaints. Local activists called the construction system totally corrupt, and said that some developers circumvent building regulations, and city authorities frequently ignore complaints. Mónica García Villegas, the owner of Colegio Rébsamen in Mexico City where 26 people including 19 children died when the building collapsed, was found guilty on 17 September 2020 of "culpable homicide" for ignoring safety regulations. The Mexico City prosecutor (FGJ-CdMx) asked for 57 years of prison.

The casualties included eight foreigners, including four Taiwanese women, a Korean man, a Spanish man, a Panamanian woman and an Argentine man. The actress Cecilia Suárez was injured while filming The House of Flowers in Condesa, Mexico City. Another famous fatality of the earthquake was Adela Peralta Leppe, Mexico's first female clown. Trapped under rubble for 30 hours after her building collapsed on her, Peralta died months later due to complications.

== Damage and aftermath ==
In Puebla, church steeples had toppled in the city of Cholula, and a church on the slopes of Popocatépetl in Atzitzihuacan collapsed during mass, killing 15 people. A second church, which was built in the 17th century, fell in Atzala during a baptism, killing 11 people including a baby.

At least 44 buildings collapsed in Mexico City due to the earthquake, trapping people inside, creating large plumes of dust, and starting fires. At least 50 to 60 people were rescued by emergency workers and citizens. Several buildings caught fire. Condesa, Roma and del Valle neighbourhoods were among those most affected in the zone: a building located on Álvaro Obregón Avenue collapsed, and several buildings on Ámsterdam Avenue suffered damage. The building housing the Philippine Embassy in Mexico City was badly damaged, requiring it to vacate the property.

Gas leaks were reported, along with "piles" of rubble from collapsed buildings. Stock prices declined at the Mexico Stock Exchange but recovered before trading was suspended. Comisión Federal de Electricidad, the national electric utility, reported that 4.78 million customers lost power in Guerrero, Morelos, Puebla, State of Mexico, Oaxaca, Tlaxcala, and parts of Mexico City—roughly 35% of the company's customers in those states. However, none of the generating stations in the region sustained structural damage.

Mexico City International Airport suspended operations while damage assessments took place, but reopened at 4:00 p.m. CDT (2100 UTC). 180 flights were cancelled or diverted during the closure. A plane carrying President Enrique Peña Nieto, returning from touring damage in Oaxaca from the earlier Chiapas earthquake, was diverted to Santa Lucía Air Force Base. Mexico City Metro service was temporarily cancelled on several subway lines due to a power failure, but restored by 17:30, offering free service to stranded passengers. Building evacuations also caused delays to Metrobús service in the city.

The federal Secretariat of the Interior (SEGOB) declared a state of emergency for all 33 municipalities of Morelos, for all 16 boroughs of Mexico City, and 112 of the 217 municipalities of Puebla. The declarations allow funds from the National Natural Disaster Fund (FONDEN) to be used during the emergency response phase. The Mexican Army and Mexican Navy deployed 3,000 active-duty troops to Mexico City through the DN-III-E and Plan Marina emergency response plans. The troops were tasked with debris cleanup, search and rescue, and security missions. Additionally, the Secretariat of National Defence moved eight helicopters to Mexico City, and activated 3 shelters in the affected areas.

A damage survey by American structural engineers revealed that a number of collapsed buildings had been erected in the 1960s and 1970s with unreinforced masonry walls confined by non-ductile concrete frames.

The hashtag #FuerzaMéxico (Be strong, Mexico) was used on social media outlets.

Mexico's political parties offered to help victims in different ways, including the diverting some of the money they receive from the government for their campaigns. After months of debate and legal challenges, the donations were: PRI US$5,792,000, PAN US$2,479,000, PVEM US$524,000, Movimiento Ciudadano US$2,529,000, Encuentro Social US$506,000, PRD US$1,239,000, and Nueva Alianza US$2,081,000; Morena and PT did not specify how much they would donate. Although these amounts were not reported to the national election board Instituto Nacional Electoral.

In association football, Copa MX postponed that week's matches in the 2017 Apertura tournament round of 16 to mid-October in the aftermath of the quake. All major national competitions—including Liga MX, Liga MX Femenil, and Ascenso MX—followed suit; Liga MX president Enrique Bonilla stated that "we'd like to bring the people a moment of happiness in this tough time, but it's a more complex decision than that and it's necessary to have all the information from the authorities."

The Mexican Navy reported that a child named Frida Sofia was believed to be still trapped under the debris of the Enrique C. Rébsamen School; the story would be widely publicized by Mexican media outlets, including coverage of apparent rescue attempts. However, by 21 September, it become increasingly clear that Sofia did not actually exist; that day, the Navy's undersecretary confirmed that all the children in the school's rubble had been accounted for, and that there was no record of a "Frida Sofia". Mexican media outlets, including television broadcasters such as Televisa, faced criticism for their sensationalised coverage of what was ultimately a hoax. "Timmy O'Toole" began to trend on Mexican social media in reference to The Simpsons episode "Radio Bart"—whose plot focused on a similar hoax perpetuated by Bart Simpson; in reference to the hoax, TV Azteca would air that episode the same day.

=== International response ===
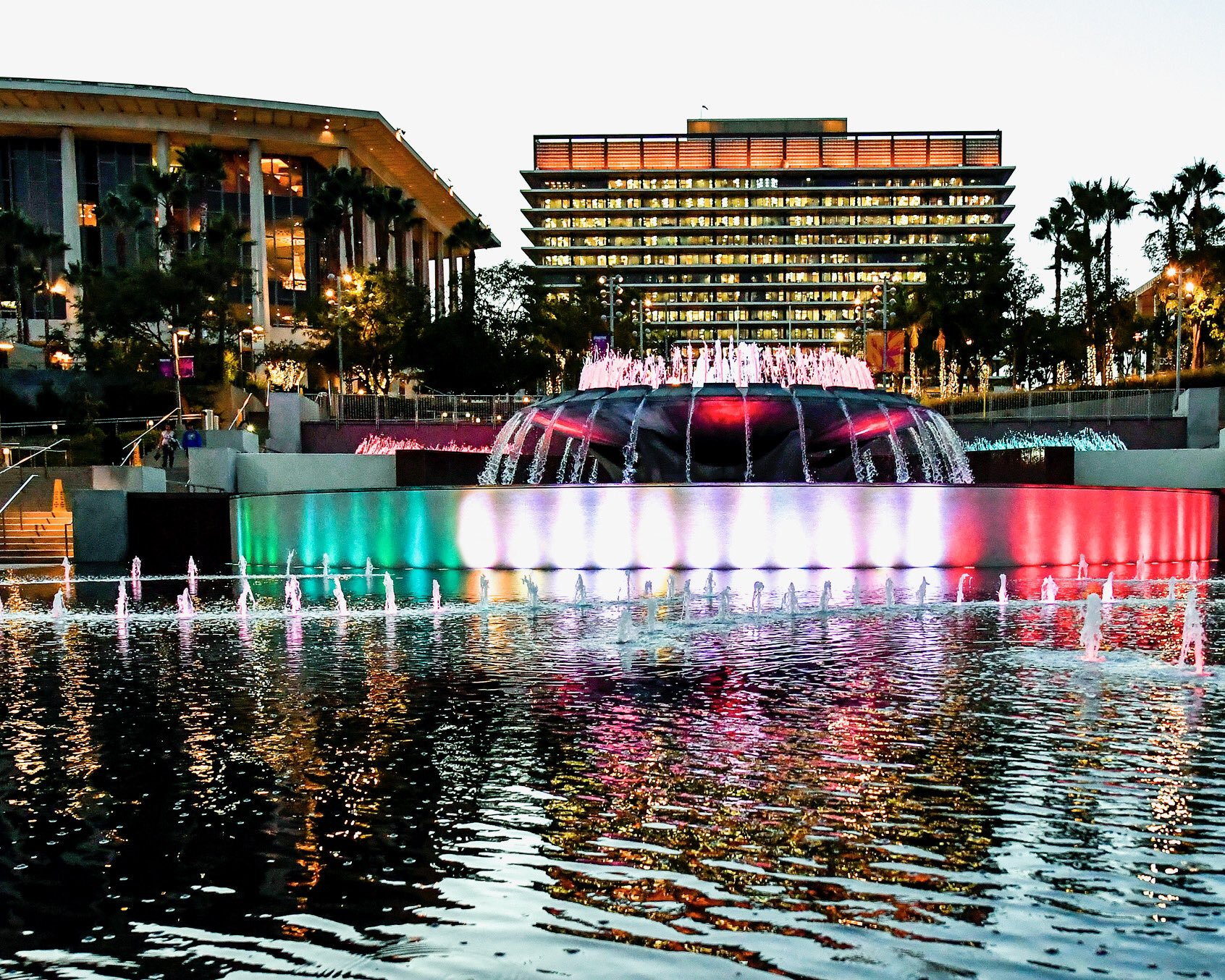
The fountain in Grand Park, Los Angeles, was lit up in Mexican flag colours in honour of the victims of the earthquake

In response to the earthquake and the preceding one in Oaxaca, by the end of September 501 rescue workers, 32 search dogs, equipment, and over 440 tonnes of humanitarian aid had been sent to Mexico from over 27 countries around the world.

Among the countries that came to Mexico's aid were Argentina, Canada, Chile, China, Colombia, Costa Rica, Ecuador, El Salvador, Germany, Honduras, Israel, Japan, Panama, Peru, Russia, Spain, South Korea, Switzerland, Turkey, the United States, the United Arab Emirates, the Vatican, and Venezuela, with aid coming from the United Nations and the European Union, as well.

Russia delivered 35 tonnes of aid supplies to Mexico, including 24.5 tonnes of canned goods, as well as 64 community-sized tents.

China shipped 3,000 tents along with more than 500 camp cots.

Canada sent 1,500 family-sized tents.

The Israel Defense Forces sent a group of 71 search and rescue soldiers including engineers, to help in the aftermath of the earthquake. The contingent had special dispensation to travel during the Rosh Hashanah holiday, normally forbidden under religious law.

The Japan International Cooperation Agency sent a disaster relief team of 72 search-and-rescue personnel, four search dogs and five tons of equipment with personnel from the Japan Disaster Relief Team, Tokyo Fire Department and the Tokyo Metropolitan Police's SAR officers. The Ministry of Foreign Affairs of the country remarked that it was a show of thanks, as Mexico had sent a search team to help Japan during the 2011 Tōhoku earthquake and tsunami.

Turkish state aid agency TİKA sent humanitarian aid – including packages containing hygienic and medical supplies prepared in coordination with the Mexican Red Cross – to Mexico City and Xochimilco. TIKA also provided tools and equipment to be used in search-and-rescue efforts.

US President Donald Trump called Peña Nieto to offer condolences, while the White House offered search and rescue assistance. The U.S. Agency for International Development deployed an urban search and rescue team from the Los Angeles County Fire Department and experts from the Office of Foreign Disaster Assistance to the affected regions.

Celebrities who donated large sums include actress Salma Hayek ($100,000), Formula 1 driver Sergio Pérez ($170,000), actress and singer Ana Brenda Contreras ($57,000), writer J. K. Rowling, singer Shawn Mendes ($100,000), Facebook founder Mark Zuckerberg ($1,000,000), Apple CEO Tim Cook ($1,000,000), and others.

Direct Relief, an emergency response organization, provided emergency response kits to a trauma hospital in southern Mexico City. They contained enough supplies to treat 1,000 people for a month. Direct Relief prepared shipments of medicines and medical supplies to improve its support to health care partners within the country.

== Aftershocks ==
2017 Central Mexico earthquake and aftershocks
Graph of earthquakes by magnitude

Map of earthquakes as of 22 September
Red mark indicates the mainshock

Number of aftershocks

== Reconstruction ==
652 homes were destroyed, 1,157 were damaged in Jojutla, Morelos, and many other buildings, including schools and the Palacio Municipal (city hall), were damaged in the earthquake. Two years later, in January 2020, residents were still waiting for reconstruction.

Nearly three-and-a-half years after the earthquake, in January 2021, César Cravioto, commissioner for reconstruction in Mexico City, reported that 53% (13,945 homes) of the buildings damaged had initiated rebuilding. Work will begin soon on 30% (8,030 homes), and work on 4,601 homes (17%) is undefined. 59 buildings have been demolished and 11 are scheduled to be demolished but have not started. Reconstruction of 21 buildings belonging to the Patrimonio Cultural Histórico are being attended to; 13 are in process and work has finished on eight. MXN $5.3 billion were budgeted for reconstruction from January 2019 to December 2020 and MXN $3.8 billion were spent.

== Gallery ==
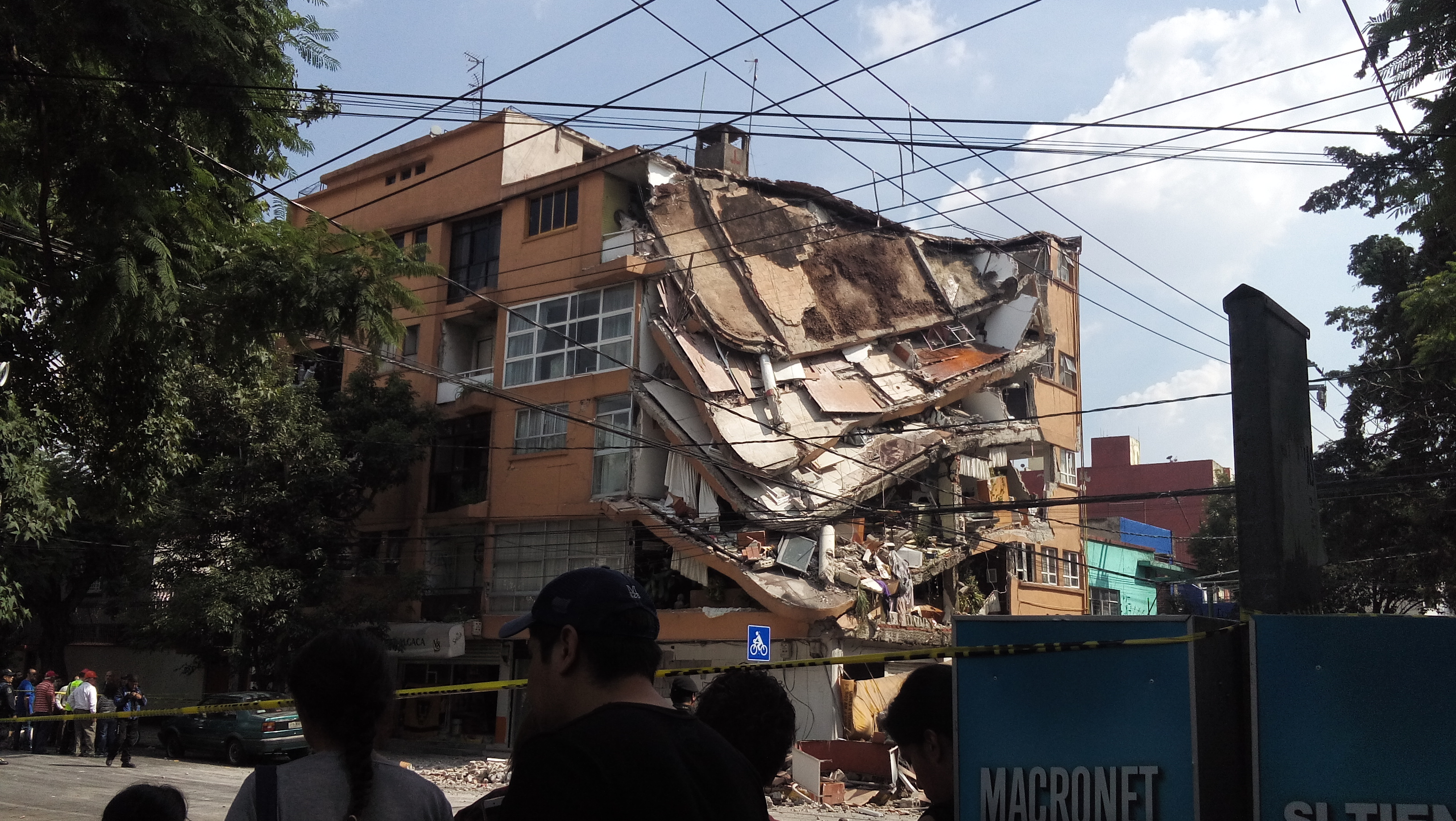
Collapsed building in Mexico City

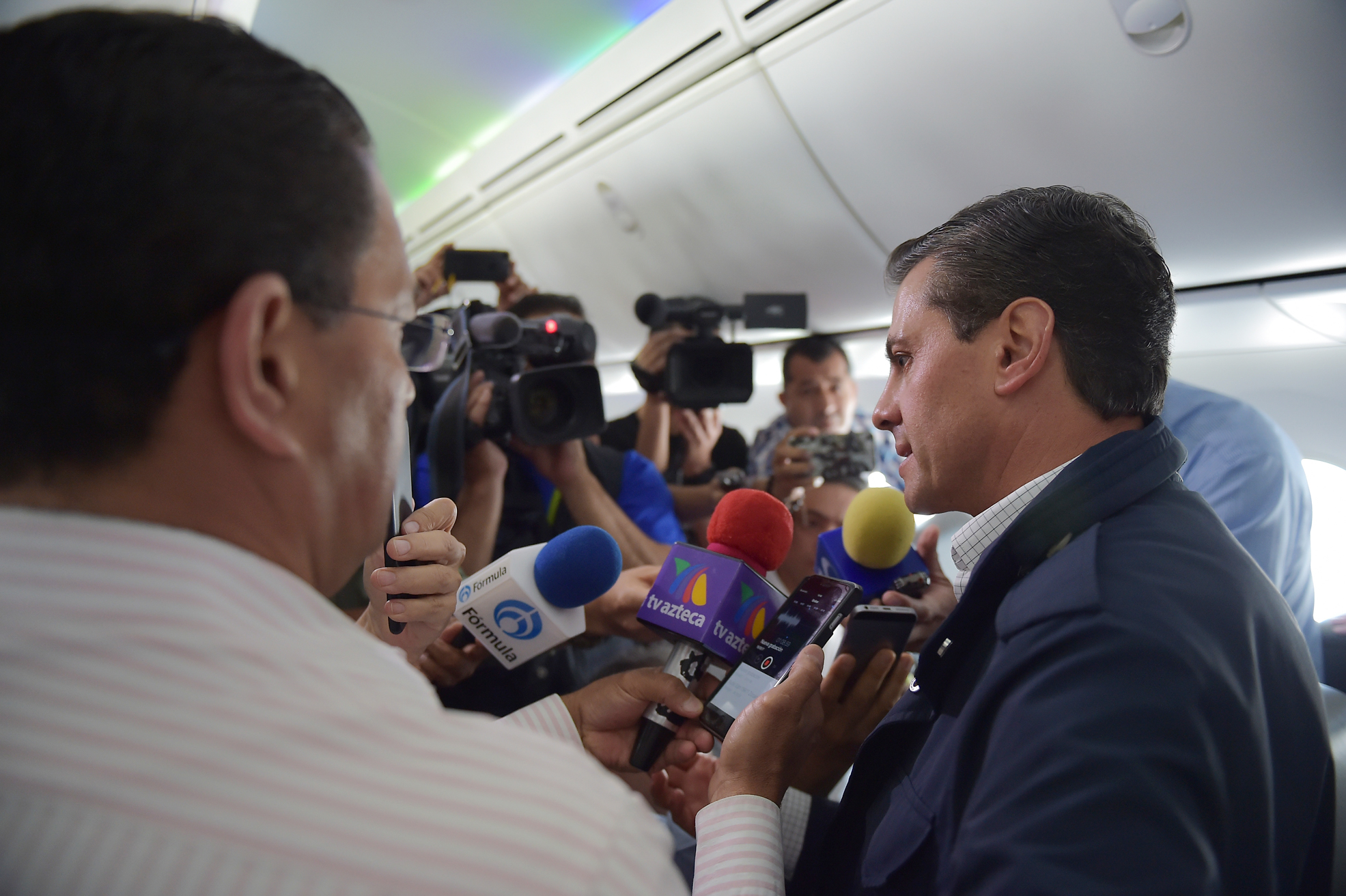
President Peña Nieto addresses the media

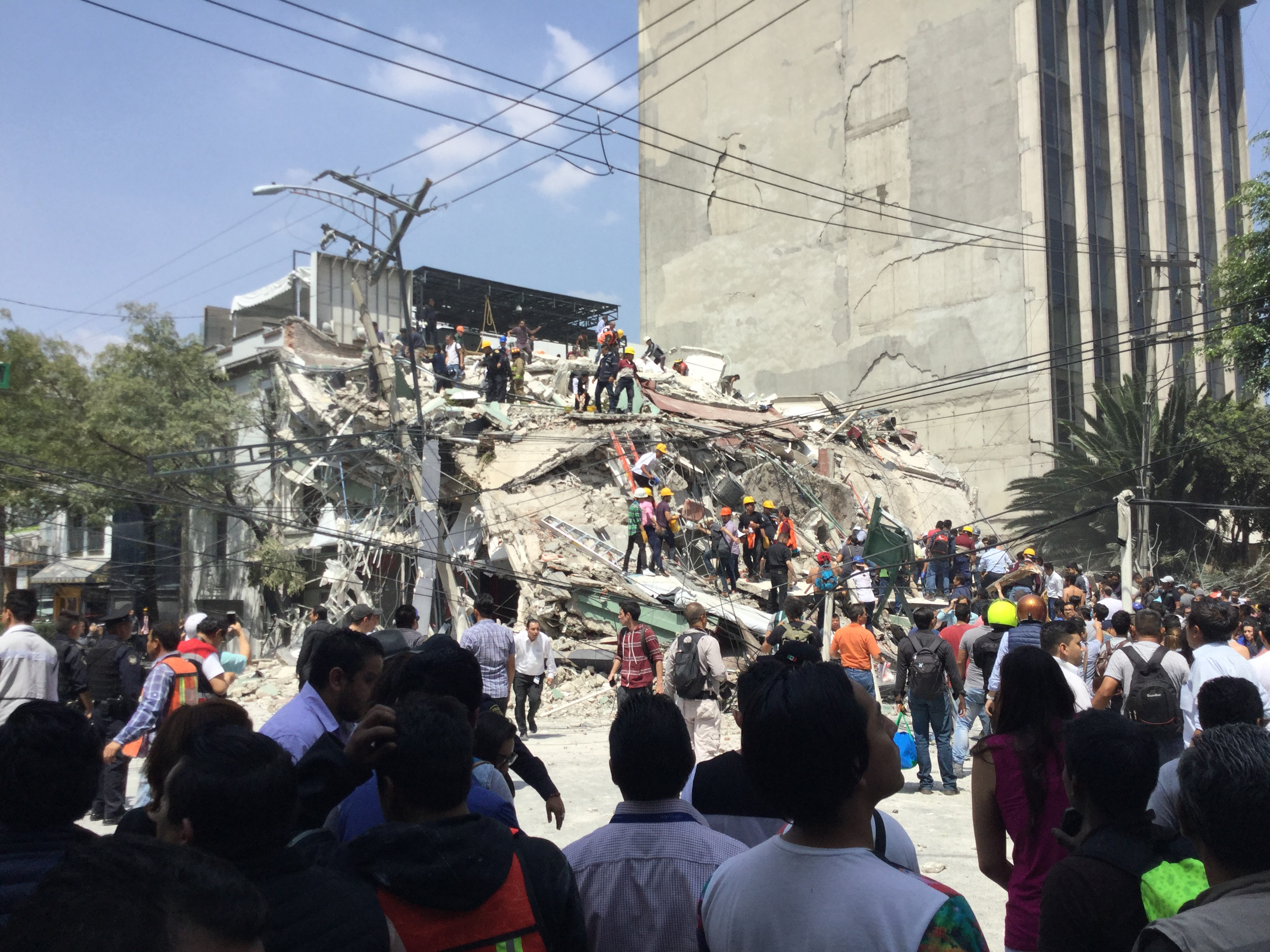
Volunteers and rescuers working at collapsed building at Colonia Roma, Mexico City.

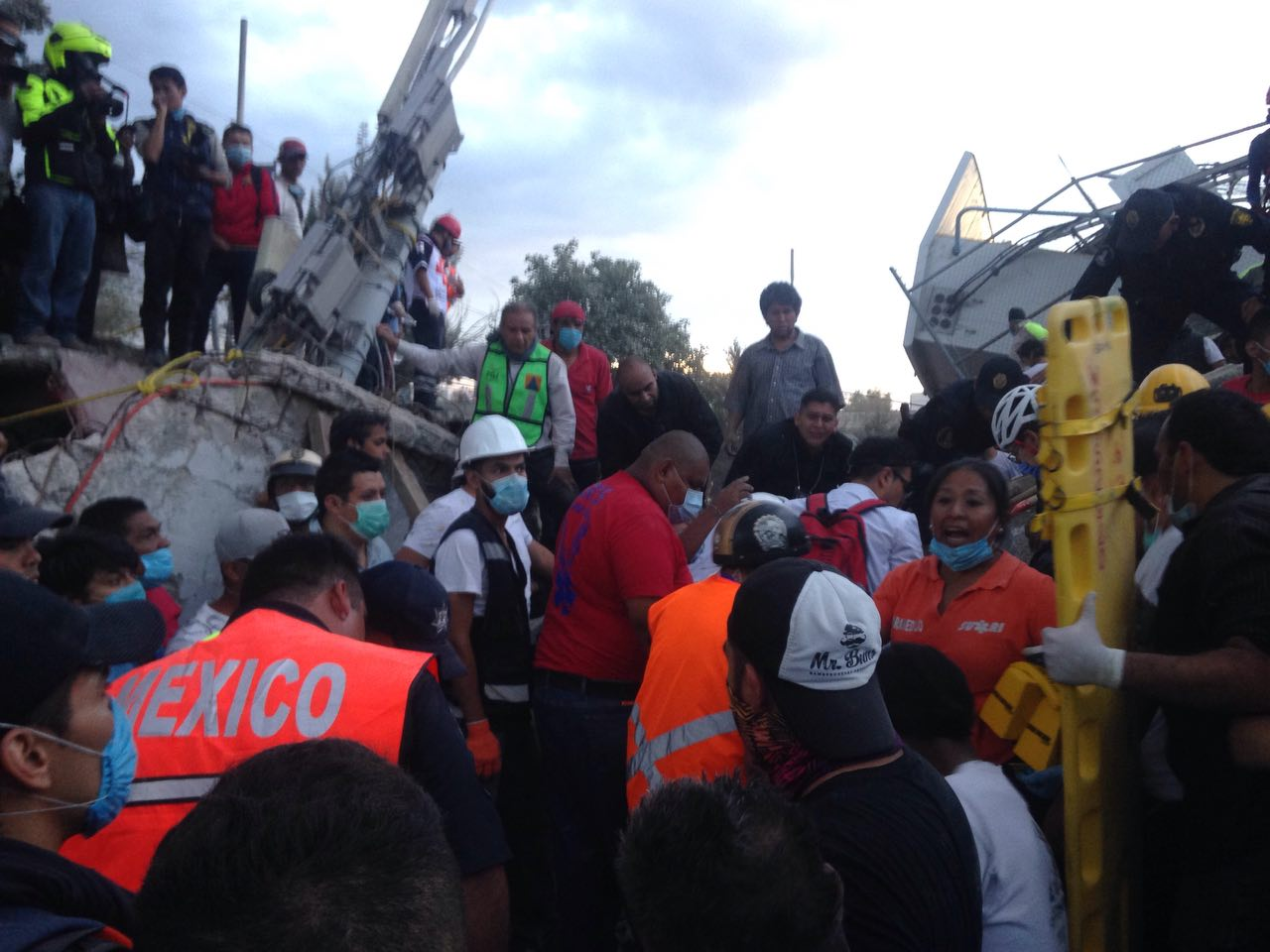
Volunteers and rescuers working at a collapsed warehouse, colonia Obrera, Mexico City.

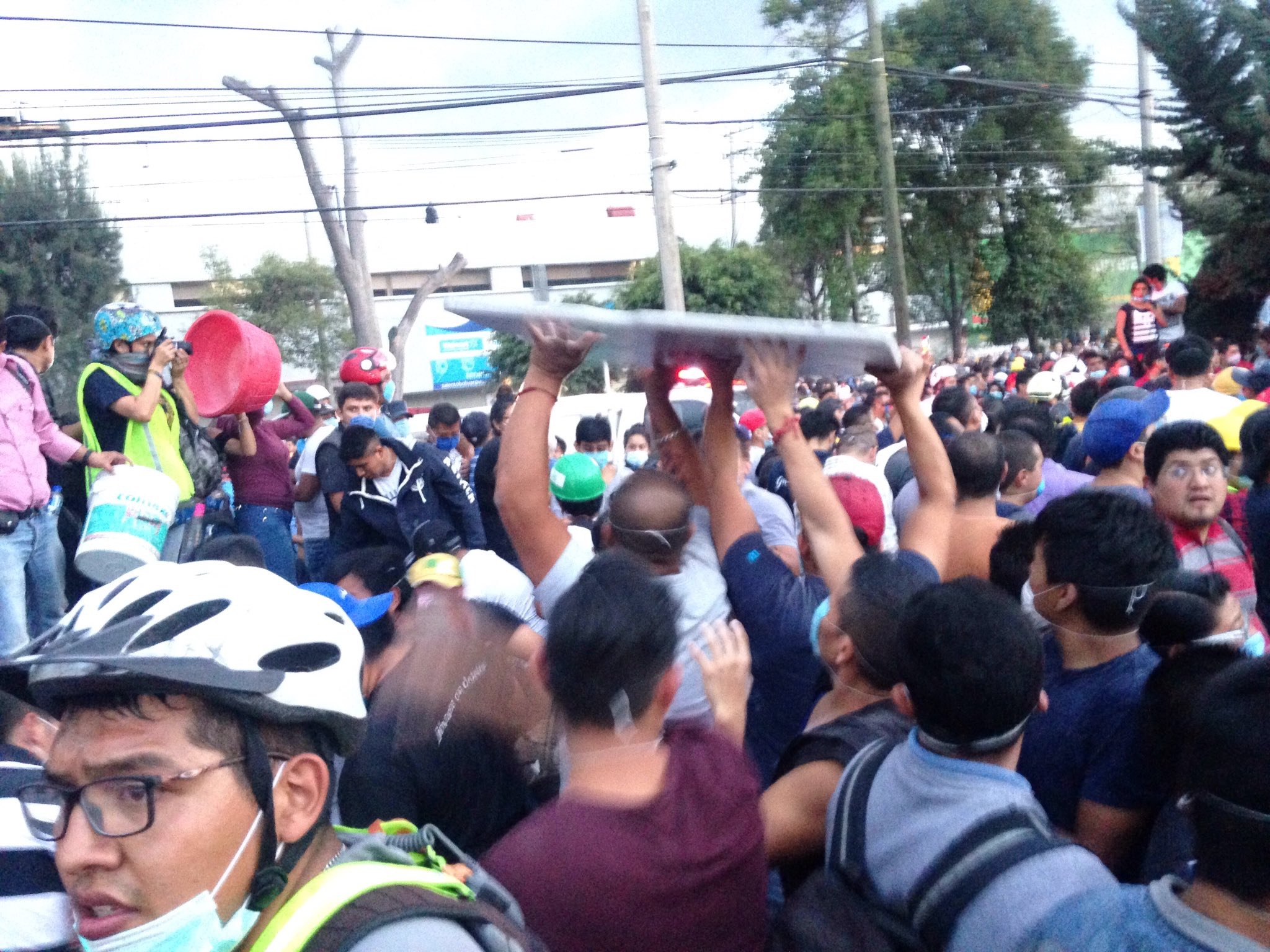
Volunteers moving debris at Colonia Obrera, Mexico City

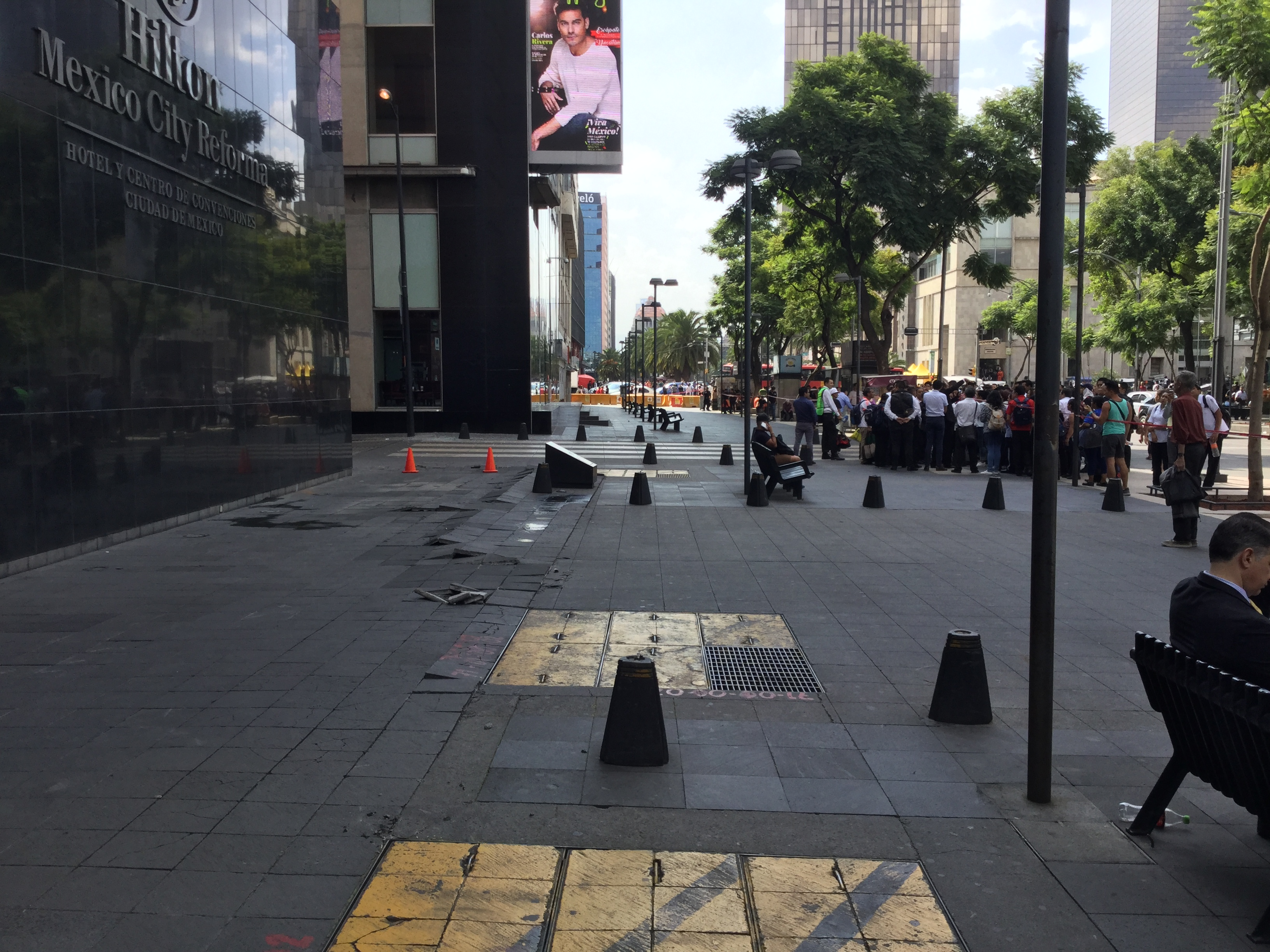
Crumbled sidewalk outside a Hilton hotel, Mexico City.

== See also ==
- List of earthquakes in 2017
- List of earthquakes in Mexico
