= 2017 Chiapas earthquake =

8.2 Mw earthquake and tsunami off of Mexico and Guatemala

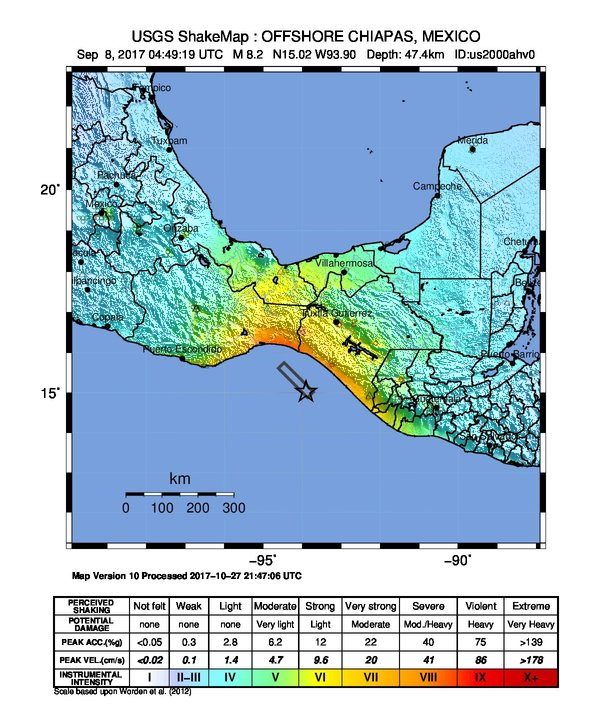

- Location within Mexico
- UTC time: 2017-09-08 04:49:19
- ISC event: 611600536
- USGS-ANSS: ComCat
- Local date: 7 September 2017
- Local time: 23:49:19 CDT
- Magnitude: 8.2 M_{w}
- Depth: 47.4 km (29.5 mi)
- Epicenter: 15.022°N 93.899°W
- Type: Dip-slip (normal)
- Areas affected: Mexico, Guatemala
- Total damage: $4 billion USD
- Max. intensity: MMI IX (Violent)
- Tsunami: 1.75 m (5.7 ft) in Chiapas
- Aftershocks: 3,831
- Casualties: 98 dead, 300+ injured

The 2017 Chiapas earthquake struck at 23:49 CDT on 7 September (local time; 04:49 on the 8th UTC) in the Gulf of Tehuantepec off the southern coast of Mexico near the state of Chiapas, approximately 87 kilometres (54 mi) southwest of Pijijiapan (alternately, 101 kilometres (63 mi) south-southwest of Tres Picos), with a Mercalli intensity of IX (Violent). The moment magnitude was estimated to be M_{w} 8.2.

The earthquake caused all of Mexico City to tremble, prompting people to evacuate after the early warning system was triggered. It also generated a tsunami with waves 1.75 metres (5 ft 9 in) above tide level; and tsunami alerts were issued for surrounding areas. Mexico's president called it the strongest earthquake recorded in the country in a century. It was also the second strongest recorded in the country's history, behind the magnitude 8.6 earthquake in 1787, the largest recorded globally in 2017 and the largest earthquake worldwide since the 2015 Illapel earthquake.

== Tectonic setting ==
The Gulf of Tehuantepec lies above the convergent boundary where the Cocos plate is being subducted below the North American plate at a rate of 6.4 cm/yr (2.5 in/yr).

== Background ==
On 6 September, several earthquake alarms in Mexico City were mistakenly activated, leading to the evacuation of buildings. The incident prompted a review of the system.

== Earthquake ==
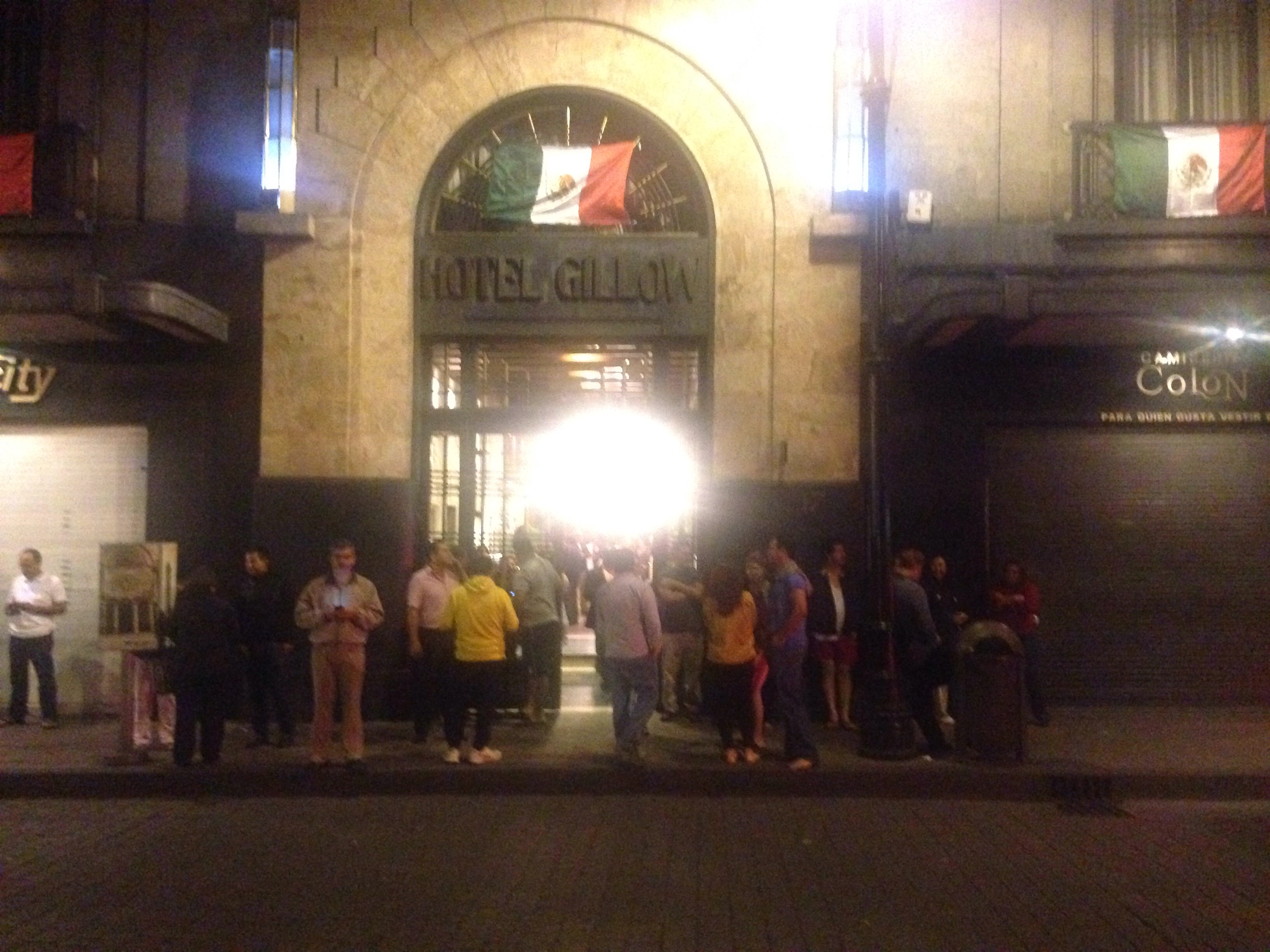
People outside a hotel in Mexico City a few minutes after the earthquake

According to the National Seismological Service (SSN) of Mexico, the epicenter was located in the Gulf of Tehuantepec, about 137 kilometres (85 mi) southeast of Tonalá, Chiapas. The United States Geological Survey (USGS) reported that the epicenter was about 87 kilometres (54 mi) southwest of Pijijiapan, Chiapas. The hypocenter was about 45 kilometres (28 mi) underground, deeper than usual for a relatively new subduction zone. The SSN reported a measurement of M 8.2, while the USGS also reported a M 8.2 earthquake after correcting an earlier estimate of M 8.0. The earthquake was a result of normal faulting within the Cocos plate with a displacement of up to 10 metres (33 ft). The entire thickness of the lithosphere of the Cocos plate ruptured during the earthquake.

The earthquake is the most powerful in Mexico to be measured by seismographs. Mexican President Enrique Peña Nieto called the earthquake the "largest in at least a century" and said that it was felt by 50 million people.

Geophysicists at the National Autonomous University of Mexico speculated that the earthquake relieved stored pressure in the "Tehuantepec gap", making future earthquakes in the region less likely.

=== Tsunami ===
A tsunami with waves of 1 m (3.3 ft) and higher was generated by the earthquake and was recorded at Salina Cruz; A tsunami wave of 1.75 m (5.7 ft) was reported in Chiapas. The Pacific Tsunami Warning Center issued a warning for the entire Pacific coast of Central America, also extending south to Ecuador.

=== Aftershocks ===
In the hour following the earthquake, at least 12 aftershocks were recorded by the USGS. As of 00:30 September 14 (UTC Time), the National Seismological Service (SSN) has recorded at least 1,806 aftershocks, of up to a magnitude of 6.1.

2017 Chiapas earthquake and aftershocks
Graph of aftershocks by magnitude

Map of aftershocks as of 13 September
Red marks earthquakes over M_{w} 8.0 and orange over M_{w} 5.0.

Number of aftershocks

List of aftershocks recorded by USGS
#	CDT time	Epicenter	Nearby landmarks	Depth	Mag.
Main	7 September 2017 23:49:21	15.068°N 93.715°W	87 km (54 mi) southwest of Pijijiapan	69.7 km (43.3 mi)	8.2
1	8 September 2017 0:01:38	15.867°N 94.088°W	29 km (18 mi) southwest of Paredon	35 km (21.7 mi)	5.7
2	8 September 2017 0:17:42	15.547°N 94.489°W	75 km (47 mi) south-southeast of San Francisco del Mar	41.3 km (25.7 mi)	5.4
3	8 September 2017 0:24:40	15.534°N 94.378°W	77 km (48 mi) southwest of Paredon	50.5 km (31.4 mi)	5.2
4	8 September 2017 0:33:38	15.345°N 94.272°W	87 km (54 mi) south-southwest of Paredon	35.0 km (21.7 mi)	5.2
5	8 September 2017 0:57:00	15.09°N 94.52°W	137 km (85 mi) southwest of Tonalá	21.0 km (13.0 mi)	5.1
6	8 September 2017 1:08:47	15.45°N 94.78°W	92 km (57 mi) southeast of Salina Cruz	10.0 km (6.2 mi)	5.0
7	8 September 2017 2:38:38	15.52°N 94.83°W	83 km (52 mi) southeast of Salina Cruz	50.0 km (31.1 mi)	5.3
8	8 September 2017 2:59:57	15.58°N 94.91°W	73 km (45 mi) southeast of Salina Cruz	50.0 km (31.1 mi)	5.2
9	8 September 2017 3:34:34	15.17°N 94.33°W	130 km (81 mi) southwest of Tonalá	16.0 km (9.9 mi)	5.9
10	8 September 2017 6:25:56	15.90°N 95.11°W	32 km (20 mi) southeast of Salina Cruz	59.0 km (36.7 mi)	5.0
11	8 September 2017 6:43:07	15.83°N 95.04°W	42 km (26 mi) southeast of Salina Cruz	59.0 km (36.7 mi)	5.2
12	8 September 2017 9:24:59	15.78°N 94.93°W	94 km (58 mi) southwest of Arriaga	16.0 km (9.9 mi)	5.3
13	8 September 2017 9:45:00	15.73°N 94.90°W	60 km (37 mi) southeast of Salina Cruz	97.0 km (60.3 mi)	5.5
14	8 September 2017 12:02:55	15.77°N 94.94°W	54 km (34 mi) southeast of Salina Cruz	71.0 km (44.1 mi)	5.0
15	8 September 2017 13:24:14	16.05°N 95.33°W	20 km (12 mi) southwest of Salina Cruz	75.0 km (46.6 mi)	5.1
16	8 September 2017 13:57:23	16.17°N 95.24°W	6 km (3.7 mi) southwest of Salina Cruz	65.0 km (40.4 mi)	5.2
17	8 September 2017 21:32:07	15.08°N 94.33°W	127 km (79 mi) southwest of Tonalá	20.0 km (12.4 mi)	5.4
18	8 September 2017 22:08:14	15.71°N 94.54°W	87 km (54 mi) southeast of Salina Cruz	16.0 km (9.9 mi)	5.3
19	8 September 2017 23:54:48	14.73°N 94.25°W	154 km (96 mi) southwest of Pijijiapan	20.0 km (12.4 mi)	5.6
20	9 September 2017 0:22:16	15.52°N 94.85°W	82 km (51 mi) southeast of Salina Cruz	16.0 km (9.9 mi)	5.2
21	9 September 2017 1:24:20	15.65°N 95.04°W	61 km (38 mi) southeast of Salina Cruz	17.0 km (10.6 mi)	5.0
22	9 September 2017 7:17:40	15.79°N 94.93°W	52 km (32 mi) southeast of Salina Cruz	55.0 km (34.2 mi)	5.4
23	9 September 2017 10:30:09	15.71°N 95.06°W	54 km (34 mi) southeast of Salina Cruz	26.0 km (16.2 mi)	5.0
24	9 September 2017 15:26:16	15.65°N 94.91°W	66 km (41 mi) southeast of Salina Cruz	32.0 km (19.9 mi)	5.0
25	9 September 2017 22:07:21	15.30°N 94.70°W	111 km (69 mi) southeast of Salina Cruz	15.0 km (9.3 mi)	5.8
26	10 September 2017 10:28:50	15.21°N 94.57°W	127 km (79 mi) southeast of Salina Cruz	20.0 km (12.4 mi)	5.0
27	11 September 2017 9:55:58	15.25°N 94.55°W	124 km (77 mi) southeast of Salina Cruz	16.0 km (9.9 mi)	5.2
28	11 September 2017 16:09:13	15.05°N 94.24°W	140 km (87 mi) southwest of Tonalá	20.0 km (12.4 mi)	5.2
29	11 September 2017 20:12:31	15.02°N 94.96°W	126 km (78 mi) southwest of Tonalá	34.0 km (21.1 mi)	5.6
30	12 September 2017 0:08:45	15.01°N 93.98°W	111 km (69 mi) southwest of Pijijiapan	13.0 km (8.1 mi)	5.3
31	12 September 2017 4:20:01	15.53°N 95.06°W	73 km (45 mi) south of Salina Cruz	16.0 km (9.9 mi)	5.0
32	12 September 2017 15:07:30	15.37°N 94.80°W	99 km (62 mi) southeast of Salina Cruz	16.0 km (9.9 mi)	5.0

== Damage and aftermath ==
Damage to Juchitán de Zaragoza City Hall

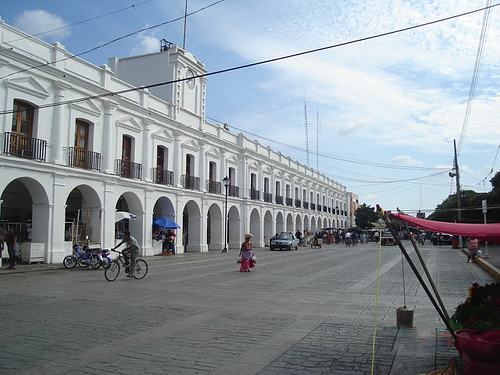
City Hall in November 2006

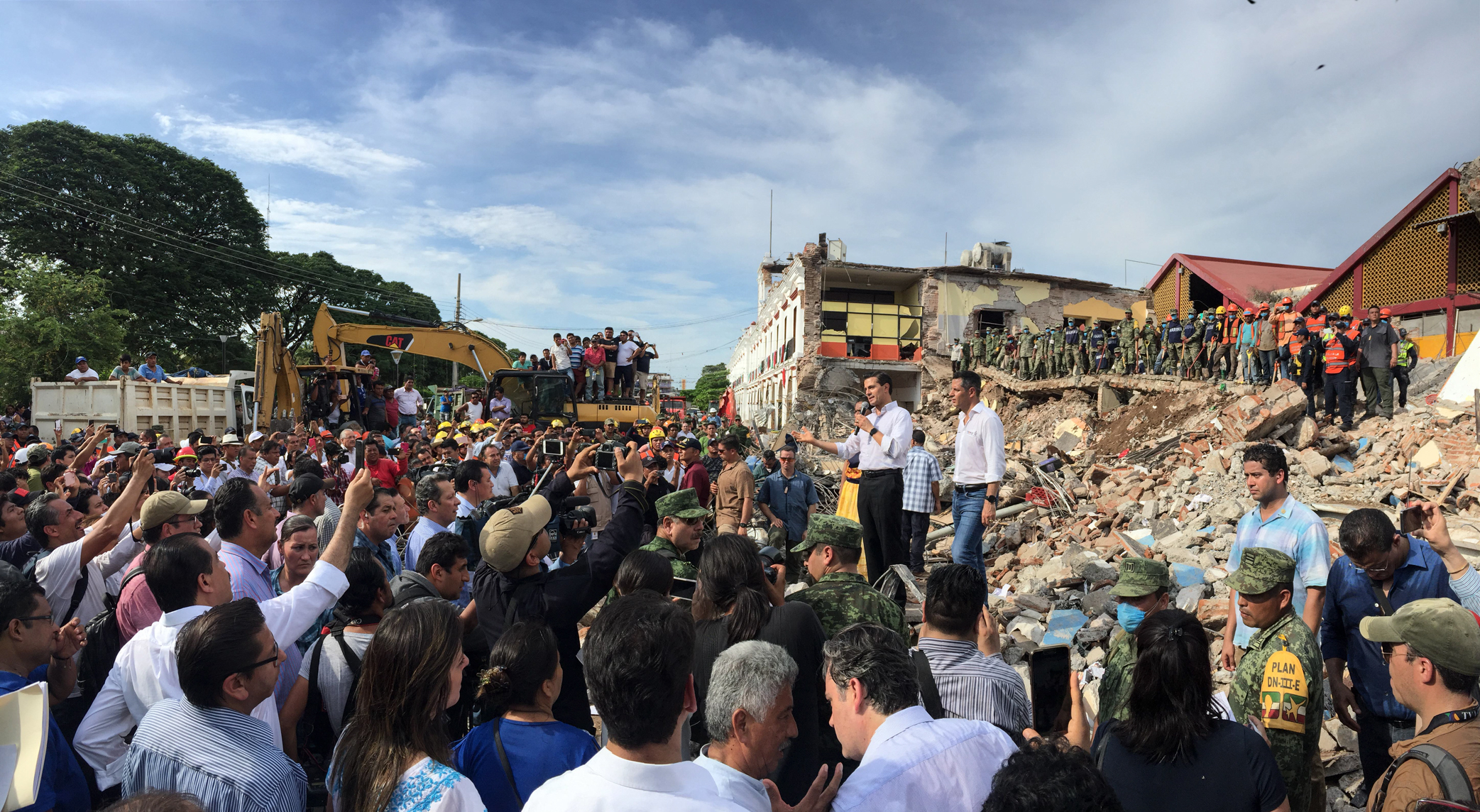
City Hall on 8 September 2017

Within Chiapas, an estimated 1.5 million people were affected by the earthquake, with 41,000 homes damaged. Jose Calzada, Minister of Agriculture, reported that at least 98 people had died in the earthquake, including 78 in Oaxaca, 16 in Chiapas and 4 in Tabasco. The Secretariat of the Interior declared a state of emergency for 122 municipalities in Chiapas, and the Mexican Army was deployed to aid in disaster relief. Schools were closed on 8 September in 11 states for safety inspections. Damage in Veracruz was reported, meanwhile the state is expecting the arrival of Hurricane Katia on 9 September. Hurricane Max made landfall in Guerrero state on 14 September, near the earthquake-stricken region.

Buildings in Juchitán de Zaragoza, Oaxaca, closest to the epicenter, were "reduced to rubble" according to reports from the town's mayor.

The earthquake also caused buildings to shake and sway in Mexico City, while also knocking out electricity for 1.8 million people. There were reports of glass shattered at Mexico City International Airport. A highway bridge under construction near Mexico City's new international airport collapsed due to the shaking.

The epicenter was near Mexico's border with Guatemala, where the quake was felt in Guatemala City, and infrastructure damage was reported by CONRED in the nation's south-west. President Jimmy Morales stated that one Guatemalan was killed.

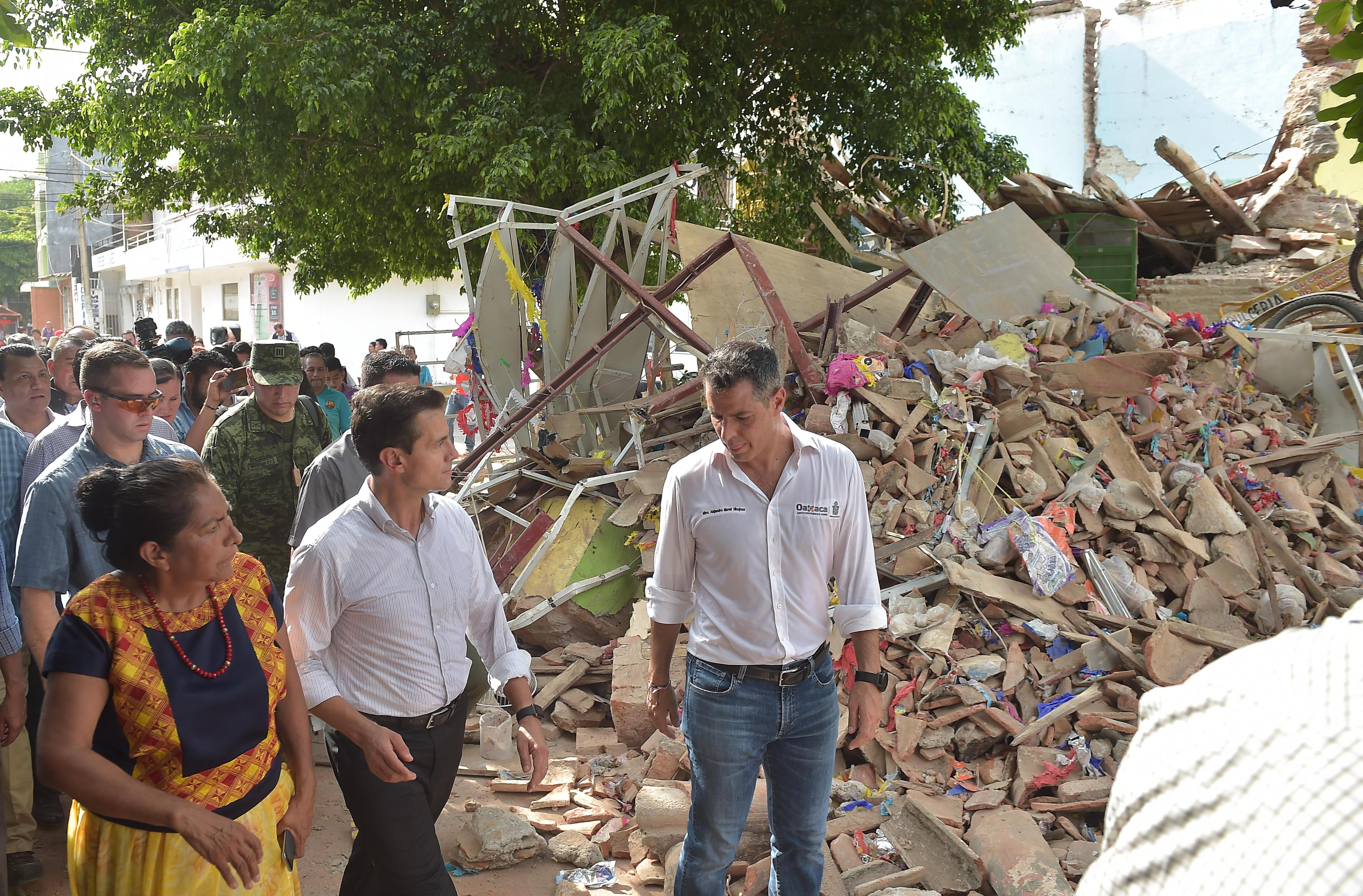
President Enrique Peña Nieto inspecting damage to a home in Juchitán, Oaxaca

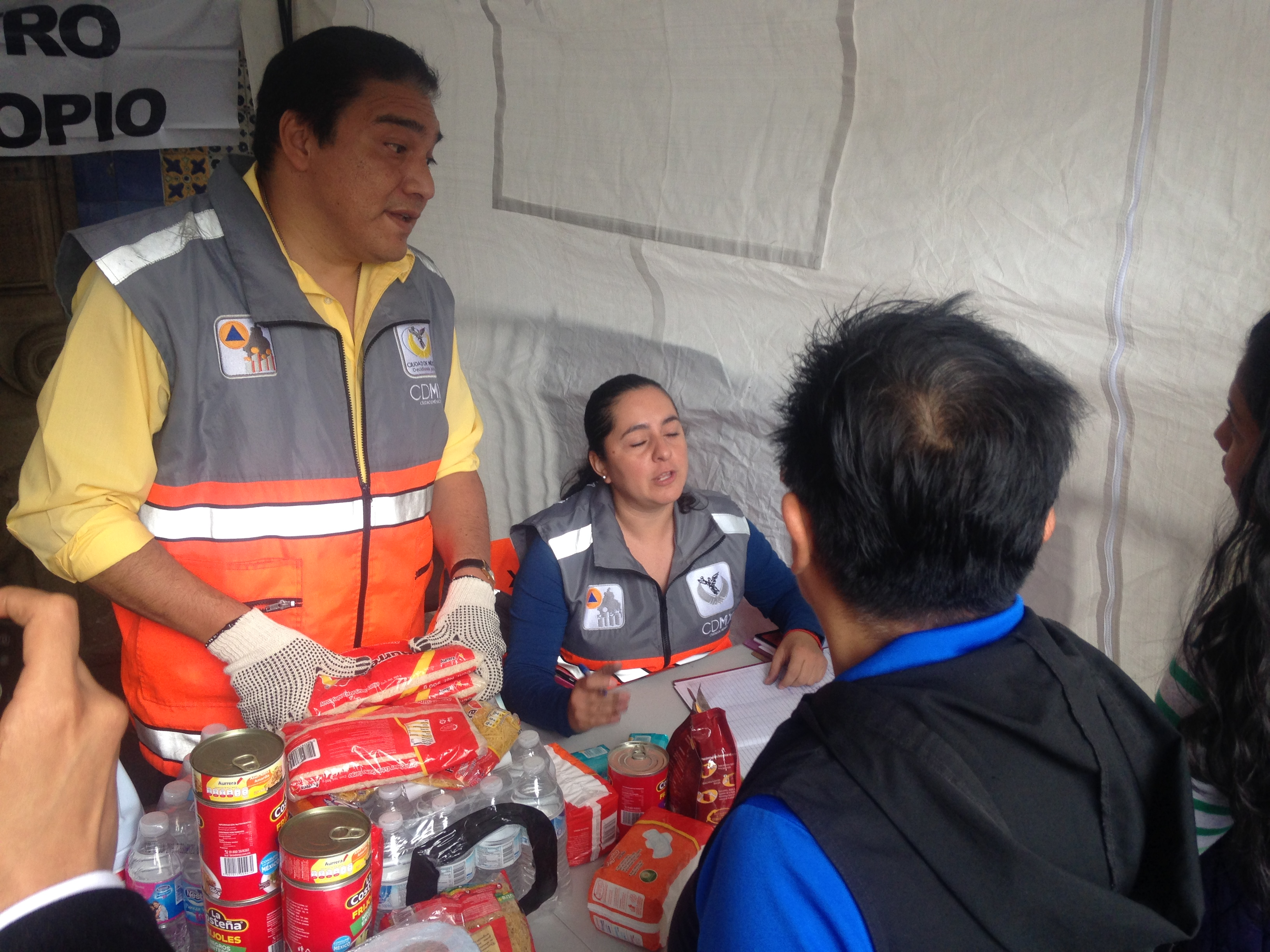
Collection Center for the victims of the earthquake, Mexico City City Hall

== Response ==
On 11 September, Mexico recalled its aid to the United States, offered in the aftermath of Hurricane Harvey, to focus on earthquake recovery.

United States President Donald Trump called Mexican President Enrique Peña Nieto on 14 September, a week after the earthquake, to express his condolences.

Three years after the earthquake, Oaxaca Governor Alejandro Murat reported that 60,000 homes have been rebuilt, but that many others still have not been. He reported that sixty health centers have been reconstructed, and in 2020 they plan to rebuild 2,000 schools.

== See also ==
- 2017 Puebla earthquake
- List of earthquakes in 2017
- List of earthquakes in Mexico
