= 1957 Guerrero earthquake =

Earthquake in Mexico

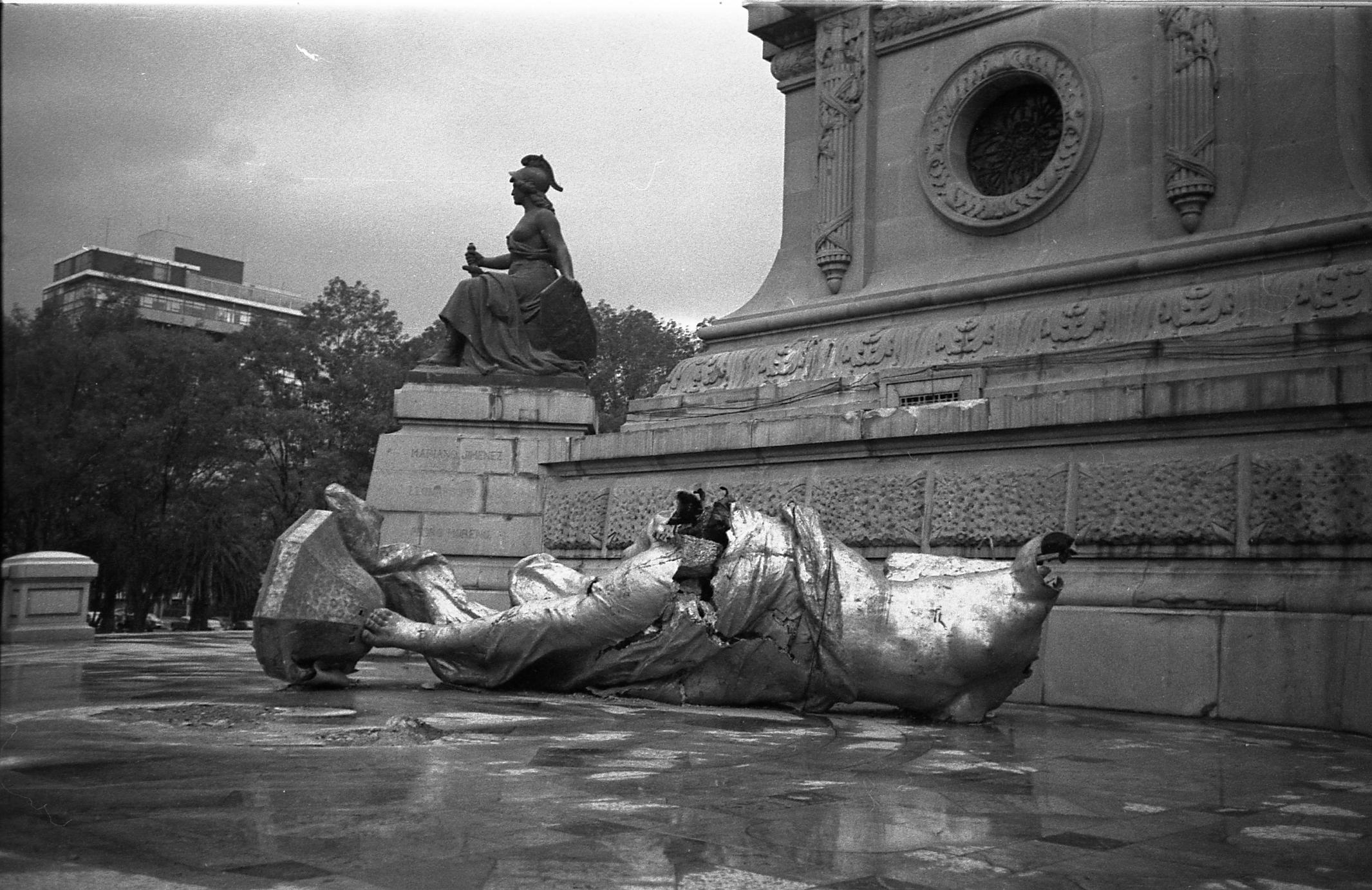
- Angel of Independence fallen after the earthquake.

- Location within Guerrero Location within Mexico
- UTC time: 1957-07-28 08:40:12
- ISC event: 886928
- USGS-ANSS: ComCat
- Local date: 28 July 1957
- Local time: 2:40
- Duration: 90 seconds
- Magnitude: 7.6 M_{w}
- Depth: 37.8 km (23 mi)
- Epicenter: 17.055°N 99.092°W
- Areas affected: Mexico
- Total damage: US$ 25 million
- Max. intensity: MMI VII (Very strong)
- Tsunami: Max. wave height = 1.3 m
- Casualties: 54–160 dead

The 1957 Guerrero earthquake occurred on 28 July at 08:40 UTC. It had a magnitude of 7.6 M_{w} and a maximum perceived intensity of VII (very strong) on the Modified Mercalli intensity scale. Mexico City and Chilpancingo were particularly badly affected. It caused the deaths of between 54 and 160 people. A small tsunami was triggered but caused little damage.

== Tectonic setting ==
The state of Guerrero lies adjacent to part of the Middle America Trench where the Cocos Plate is being subducted beneath the North American Plate. The convergence between these plates at this location is about 65 mm per year. There have been many large and destructive earthquakes in the past, such as the M 7.6 1911 Guerrero earthquake. The Guerrero seismic gap is a ca. 200 km long segment of the subduction interface, which has not had a large earthquake since the 1911 event. Although several slow earthquakes have been observed in that time interval, an earthquake in the range M 7.9–8.0 could still be expected within the Guerrero gap.

== Earthquake ==
The earthquake originally had an estimated magnitude of 7.9 M_{s}. This was recalculated by the International Seismological Centre in their ISC-GEM catalogue as 7.6 M_{w}. The duration of strong shaking was recorded as 90 seconds in Mexico City. The earthquake is thought to have ruptured the plate interface at the southeastern end of the Guerrero seismic gap.

== Damage ==
The greatest damage was observed in Mexico City, where many buildings were destroyed, including the Angel of Independence, whose structure collapsed and its angel fell. Chilpancingo was also badly affected with 90% of buildings being damaged. The towns of Ayutla, Chilapa, Huamuxtitlán, San Luis Acatlan, San Marcos, Tlapa and Huitzuco all sustained significant damage.

== See also ==
- 1985 Mexico City earthquake
- 2017 Mexico City earthquake
- List of earthquakes in 1957
- List of earthquakes in Mexico
