= 2011 Guerrero earthquake =

2011 earthquake of moment magnitude of 5.7 in southern Mexico

- UTC time: 2011-05-05 13:24:07
- ISC event: 16497740
- USGS-ANSS: ComCat
- Local date: 5 May 2011
- Local time: 08:24:08
- Duration: ~1 minute
- Magnitude: 5.7 M_{w}
- Depth: 24 km (15 mi)
- Epicenter: 16.808°N 98.592°W
- Type: Interplate
- Areas affected: Mexico
- Total damage: Minimal
- Max. intensity: MMI VI (Strong)
- Aftershocks: 5 (≤4.1 M_{L})
- Casualties: None reported

The 2011 Guerrero earthquake struck with a moment magnitude of 5.7 in southern Mexico at 08:24 local time on 5 May. It was positioned west of Ometepec, Guerrero, with a focal depth of 24 km (14.9 mi), and was lightly felt in many adjacent areas.

Buildings swayed with the tremor in Mexico City, prompting evacuations and causing panic among many. Following the quake, police patrolled city streets for safety reasons and damage assessments were carried out across the affected region. There were no casualties, though two local police stations suffered slight damage. A number of light aftershocks succeeded the main event, of which the strongest measured a magnitude of 4.1 (M_{L}).

== Geology ==
The magnitude 5.7 (M_{w}) earthquake occurred inland near the southern coast of Mexico at a depth of 24 km (14.9 mi), with a duration of nearly one minute and an epicenter about 55 km (34 mi) west of Ometepec, Guerrero. In the region, the Cocos, North American, and Caribbean plates converge and create a tectonic zone of continuous seismic activity. The quake struck near the eastern periphery of the Guerrero seismic gap, which extends from Acapulco to Ixtapa–Zihuatanejo and contains enough seismic energy to generate an earthquake of up to magnitude 7.5, but it did not cause the gap to rupture. Initial estimates from the USGS placed its intensity at a magnitude of 5.8 (M_{w}); the National Seismological Service registered the earthquake at magnitude 5.5 (M_{L}).

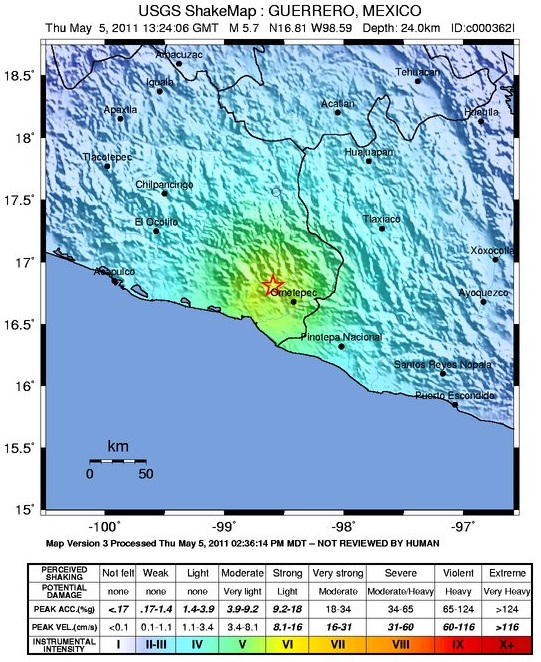
USGS shake map

Owing to the moderate magnitude of the quake, significant shaking was felt only in localized parts of Costa Chica, registering strongest at VI (strong) on the Mercalli scale in Azoyú and V (moderate) in populous areas around the epicenter. Lighter ground motions (MM IV–III) were perceived in much of Guerrero, including Acapulco and Chilpancingo, with weak tremors (MM II) reported as far away as in Mexico City, about 300 km (187 mi) from the epicenter. The capital city rests on a former lakebed of largely unconsolidated sedimentary layers, so earthquake shaking in its vicinity is generally amplified.

== Aftershocks ==
By 6 May, a total of five light aftershocks had occurred near the earthquake's epicenter. Of the five, the first registered a magnitude of 3.7 (M_{L}) and struck about 15 minutes after the main shock, and was succeeded by a magnitude 3.9 (M_{L}) tremor at 10:09 local time. Two similar quakes of minor intensity struck the region the next day; however, the strongest and final aftershock registered a magnitude of 4.1 (M_{L}) and occurred at 04:00 in the morning.

== Impact and response ==
Despite relatively strong ground motions, damage to the area was very limited; structures around the epicenter were a mix of fairly vulnerable and resistant to earthquake shaking. Buildings swayed with the tremor in Mexico City, causing panic among many citizens and prompting some to evacuate. Several schools in Guerrero were evacuated as a safety precaution. The earthquake and its aftershock sequence contributed to intermittent power outages in Acapulco; more than 40,000 residences in some 40 districts remained without power by the next day. There were no reports of major losses or fatalities in the wake of the tremor, though two police stations located in Acapulco and Marquelia suffered light damage. Elsewhere, some fallen roof tiles and small landslides occurred east of the epicenter in Cuautepec.

Prior to the arrival of seismic waves in Mexico City, seven of twelve earthquake sensors near the coast of Guerrero detected a "potentially significant quake". Alert systems were subsequently activated in the area, giving locals at least 50 seconds to secure themselves. Shortly after impact, authorities dispatched five helicopters to ascertain any damage in the wake of the quake. SSP officials, along with over 3,000 police officers, patrolled the city streets as a safety measure. In response to the earthquake's occurrence, the Federal District announced the installation of 50,000 seismic alarms in local schools, hospitals, and offices. Reassessments of structural conditions—particularly in earthquake-prone parts of the state—were scheduled, and about 1,817,000 government workers partook in an earthquake simulation exercise the following day.

=== Scientific reaction ===
Although the intensity of the quake was fairly significant, specialists reported that earthquakes of such magnitude do not release nearly enough seismic energy to prevent a major earthquake from occurring in the region. In reality, roughly 900 earthquakes of similar intensities to that of the Guerrero earthquake are required per year to total the energy unleashed by a magnitude 7.5 event. Many locals perceived an apparent increase in recent earthquake occurrences, though at the time seismologists registered normal levels of seismic activity in the area. In 2009, a similar magnitude 5.8 M_{w} earthquake struck Guerrero near Acapulco at a depth of 35 km (22 mi), killing at least two people.

== See also ==
- List of earthquakes in 2011
- List of earthquakes in Mexico
- Seismicity in Mexico
