= 1852 Acapulco earthquake =

Natural disaster

1852 Acapulco Earthquake
- Location within Mexico
- UTC time: 1852-12-05 04:10
- Local date: 4 December 1852
- Local time: 22:10 UTC−06:00
- Magnitude: M_{w} 7.8
- Epicenter: 16.863611°N 99.8825°W
- Total damage: $5 million
- Max. intensity: MMI IX (Violent)

The 1852 Acapulco earthquake had an estimated magnitude of M_{w} 7.8 and a maximum Mercalli intensity of IX (Violent).

== Description ==
The earthquake was registered at about 10:10 p.m. on 4 December 1852, totally destroying Acapulco. There were few deaths but many injuries. The cost of damage was estimated at $5 million or more. The earthquake generated a small tsunami that caused the sea to retreat about 6 metres (20 ft) from the coast in Acapulco. Despite fears that it would return and flood the town, the normal sea level was gradually restored.

According to a local newspaper published the next day: "Last night at 10:24 a strong earthquake was felt in this capital (Acapulco), which was tremulous at first, and in which later we thought we noticed three oscillations from North to south. The earthquake lasted about ten seconds and caused great alarm in the population. So far we do not know that any unfortunate accident has occurred."

== Technical ==
The earthquake occurred on the Jalisco–Michoacán–Guerrero subduction zone. It was reported at 16 locationswith a maximum intensity at IX. Magnitude of the quake is estimated at M_{w} 7.8.

== See also ==
- List of historical earthquakes
- List of earthquakes in Mexico

== Sources ==
- Catálogo de Sismos (in Spanish), UNAM – Instituto de Geofísica de la UNAM
- Sismo histórico: Acapulco, Guerrero, 4 de diciembre de 1852 (in Spanish), Gobierno de México
- "Sismo indescriptible provocó un gran tsunami, así reaccionó México", La Verdad, 4 December 2019
