= 2012 Guerrero–Oaxaca earthquake =

Earthquake in the Guerrero-Oaxaca border, Mexico

- Location within Mexico
- UTC time: 2012-03-20 18:02:47
- ISC event: 600800706
- USGS-ANSS: ComCat
- Local date: 20 March 2012
- Local time: 12:02
- Duration: 40–300 seconds
- Magnitude: 7.4 M_{w}
- Depth: 20 km (12.4 mi)
- Epicenter: 16.42°N 98.36°W
- Type: Thrust
- Areas affected: Mexico
- Total damage: Some rural areas affected. Over 30,000 houses damaged or destroyed.
- Max. intensity: MMI VIII (Severe)
- Aftershocks: 6.0 M_{w} 2 April at 17:36
- Casualties: 2 dead, 11 injured

The 2012 Guerrero–Oaxaca earthquake struck southern Mexico with a moment magnitude of 7.4 at 12:02 local time on Tuesday, 20 March. Its epicenter was near Ometepec, in the border between the states of Guerrero and Oaxaca. With a shallow focus of 20 km, the earthquake caused strong shaking over a large area along the Oaxaca–Guerrero border and the adjacent Pacific coastline. Significant tremors were felt in areas up to several hundred kilometers away, including Mexico City and also in Guatemala. Two people were killed and over 30,000 houses were damaged or destroyed.

== Tectonic setting ==
The states of Guerrero and Oaxaca lie above the convergent boundary where the Cocos plate is being subducted below the North American plate at a rate of 6.4 cm/yr (2.5 in/yr). The dip of the subducting slab is about 15° as defined by focal mechanisms and hypocenters of previous earthquakes. Seismicity in this area is characterized by regular megathrust earthquakes along the plate interface. In addition, there have been a series of historic normal fault events within the subducting slab.

== Earthquake ==
According to the National Seismological Service (NSS) of Mexico, the epicenter was located in the Oaxaca-Guerrero border, about 30 km south of Ometepec and 8 km southeast of Cuajinicuilapa. The United States Geological Survey (USGS) reported the epicenter in the state of Oaxaca, about 23 km east of Ometepec and 6 km northwest of San Juan Cacahuatepec. The depth was reported as 15 km by NSS and 20 km by the USGS. The slip of the earthquake was compactly distributed in an area of about 30 km × 30 km.

The focal mechanism and depth of the earthquake indicate that it was a result of thrust faulting along or close to the plate interface. Similar earthquakes have struck the area before, including the 1932 Jalisco earthquake, the 1985 Mexico City earthquake, the 1995 Colima–Jalisco earthquake and the 2003 Colima earthquake.

The earthquake coincided with an earthquake drill in Chiapas. The earthquake drill, simulating an earthquake of magnitude 7.9 on the Richter scale, was implemented by the Protección Civil of Chiapas on 20 March. The earthquake drill started at 12:00, and the real earthquake occurred just minutes later.

=== Damage ===
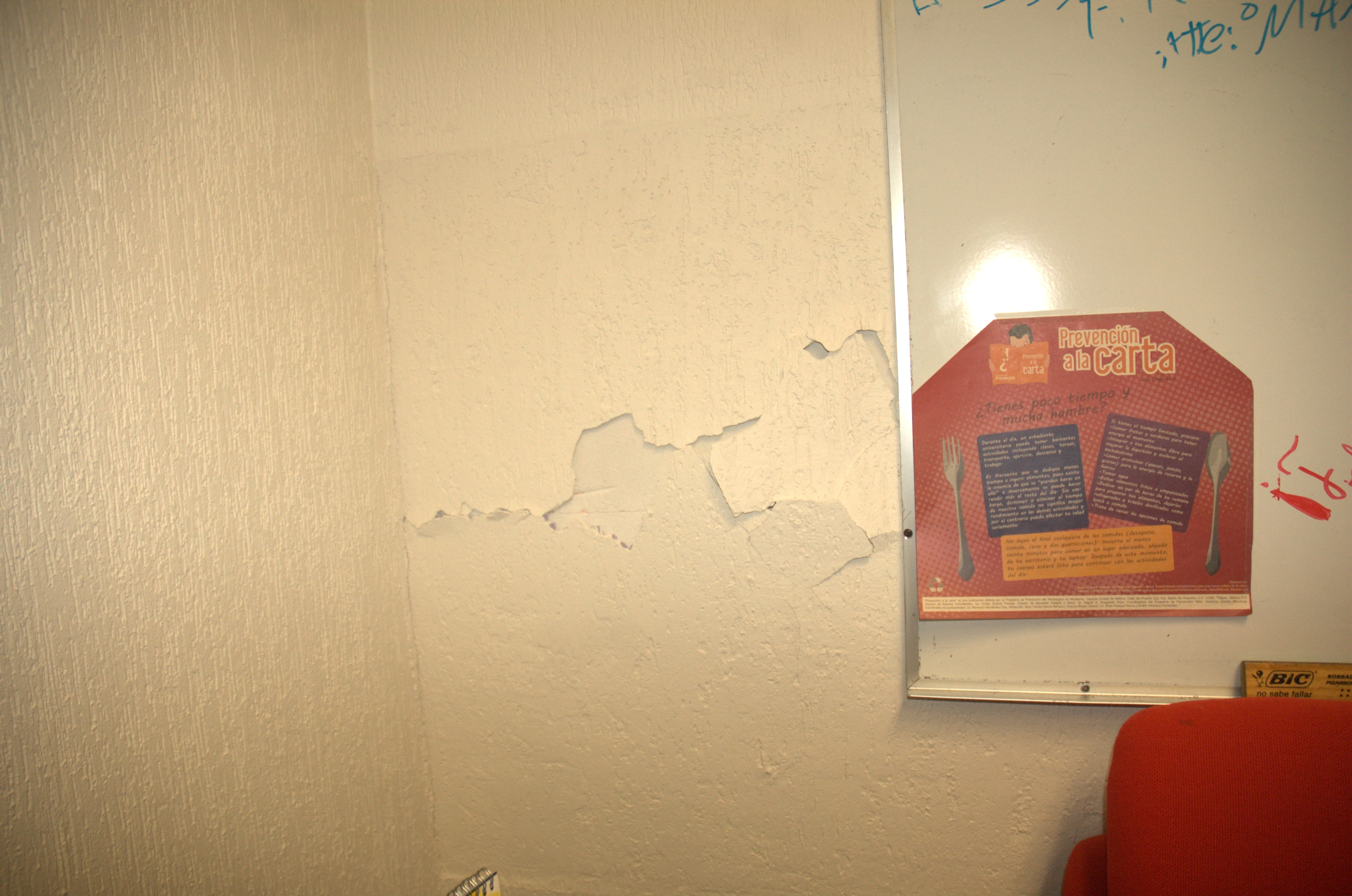
Structural damage caused by the earthquake at the Monterrey Institute of Technology and Higher Education, Mexico City Campus

The airport of Mexico City was closed for a short time and reopened after no damage had been observed. The trading of Mexican Stock Exchange (BMV) was suspended. The earthquake caused power outage in central and eastern Mexico and affected 2.5 million users according to Comisión Federal de Electricidad (CFE). On 22 March it was announced that two people were killed in Cuajinicuilapa because of the earthquake, one direct and one indirect. The first died due to the injuries caused after a wall collapsed on him in El Tamale community, while the second suffered a heart attack, in San Nicolás.

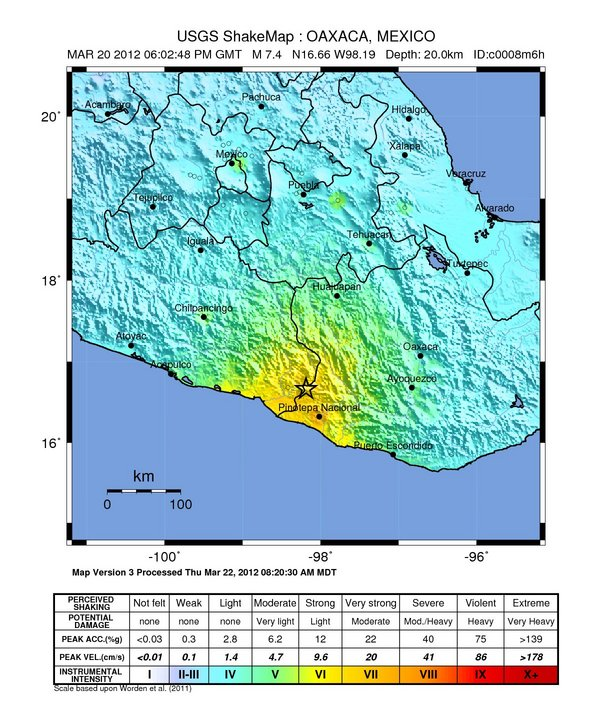
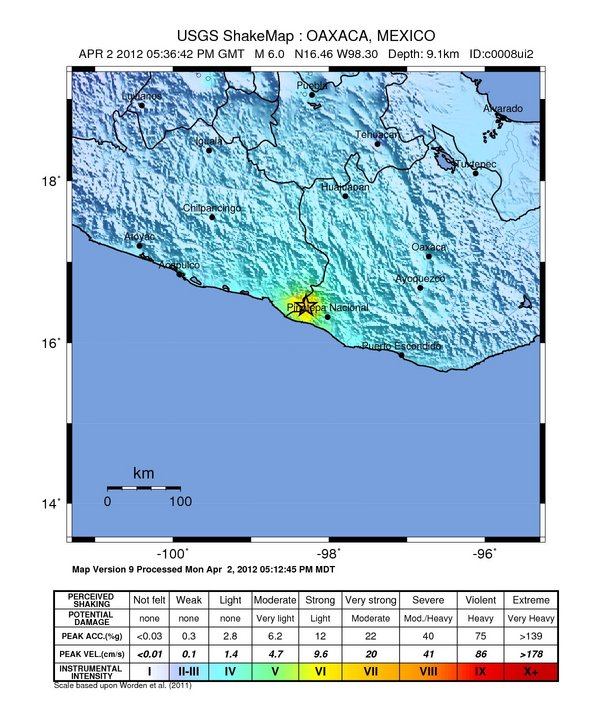
USGS ShakeMaps showing the intensity for the mainshock (left) and 2 the April event

=== Intensity ===
The earthquake struck during the midday in a moderately populated region, with a mix of earthquake-resistant and vulnerable structures. The strongest ground motions registered at very strong (MM VII) on the Mercalli intensity scale, affecting smaller cities and towns near the epicenter such as San Juan Cacahuatepec, Cuajinicuilapa, Ometepec and Pinotepa Nacional. Many other areas in the states of Guerrero and Oaxaca experienced strong (MM VI) shaking, while larger cities—such as Huajuapan de León, Oaxaca, Tehuacán, Puebla, and Acapulco, Guerrero—experienced moderate (MM V) tremors. Lighter ground motions(MM IV–III)spread through much of south-central Mexico. The earthquake could be felt in the federal entities of Guerrero, Mexico City, State of Mexico, Morelos, Querétaro, Michoacán, Puebla, Tabasco, Tlaxcala, Hidalgo, Oaxaca, Chiapas, Veracruz, Colima, Jalisco, San Luís Potosí, Guanajuato, Campeche, and Sinaloa of Mexico, and also in Guatemala. The intensity in Mexico City was MM VI–VII, which was stronger than the surrounding area because of local topography and soil conditions. Part of a pedestrian bridge collapsed on a small passenger bus in Azcapotzalco, Mexico City, with no injuries reported. The service of Mexico City Metro Line A was interrupted because of track damage.

=== Aftershocks ===
Multiple aftershocks have been reported in the Guerrero–Oaxaca region. According to the NSS, 828 aftershocks have occurred, the strongest of them was felt on 2 April 2012. It was a magnitude 6.0 M_{W} earthquake that struck at 12:36 local time (18:36 UTC).

== Aftermath ==
According to Asociación Mexicana de Instituciones de Seguros (AMIS), it was estimated that insurance companies would have to pay 2.07 billion pesos ($100.9 million USD) due to the earthquake. 80% of the loss was concentrated in Guerrero, followed by Mexico City, Oaxaca, and Puebla.
