= 2014 Guerrero earthquake =

Earthquake in Mexico

- Location within Mexico
- UTC time: 2014-04-18 14:27:24
- ISC event: 604462903
- USGS-ANSS: ComCat
- Local date: 18 April 2014
- Local time: 09:27
- Magnitude: M_{w} 7.2–7.3
- Depth: 24 km (15 mi)
- Epicenter: 17.552°N 100.816°W
- Areas affected: Mexico
- Total damage: 21 homes collapsed in Guerrero; Blackouts in Pachuca, Ecatepec, Chimalhuacán, Colonia del Valle, Nezahualcóyotl, Ixtapaluca, Azcapotzalco, Coyoacán, Xochimilco, Tláhuac, Cuauhtémoc, and around the state of Guerrero
- Max. intensity: MMI VII (Very strong)
- Tsunami: No
- Landslides: 13 reported landslides in Guerrero, 3 in Tlaxcala, Morelos and Michoacán
- Aftershocks: 31
- Casualties: 1 injured

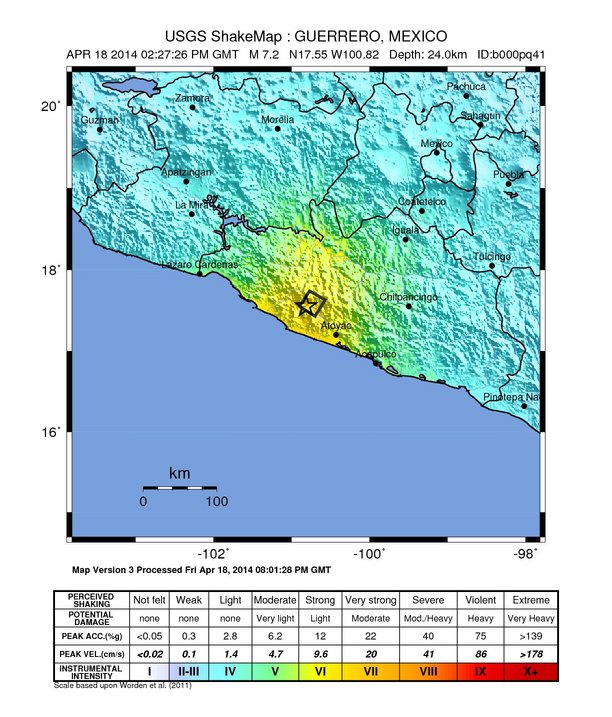
Earthquake intensity map (USGS)

The 2014 Guerrero earthquake occurred with a moment magnitude of 7.2–7.3 that hit the state of Guerrero, close to Acapulco, Mexico, on 18 April at 14:27:26 UTC (9:27 a.m. local time). The epicenter occurred 265 kilometers southwest of Mexico City and at a depth of 24 kilometers. Thrust motion at shallow depths is what caused the earthquake. This was broadly consistent with a slip on or near the Guerrero Seismic Gap, a boundary between the Cocos and North American plates along the Pacific coast approximately 200 kilometers long. The shaking was felt in states as far away as Puebla and Tlaxcala.

== Location ==
The April 2014 earthquake was located just northwest of the rupture area of a 1957 Guerrero earthquake that measured 7.8 on the moment magnitude scale. Since 1975, 23 earthquakes of magnitude 6.0 or greater have occurred within 200 kilometers of the same area as the April 2014 earthquake.

== Damage ==
One person was injured when a wall collapsed in the city of Lazaro Cardenas, Michoacan. 30 homes and a few buildings in Morelia sustained minor damage. At least 700 buildings and over 500 homes were damaged in Guerrero, and 21 homes collapsed. Building and home damage was also reported in capital Mexico City and states Morelos, Tlaxcala, Veracruz, State of Mexico, and Puebla.

Blackouts were reported in Pachuca, Ecatepec, Chimalhuacán, Colonia del Valle, Nezahualcóyotl, Ixtapaluca, Azcapotzalco, Coyoacán, Xochimilco, Tláhuac, Cuauhtémoc, and around the state of Guerrero.

Landslides were reported, including 13 in Guerrero, 1 in Morelos, 1 in Michoacan, and 1 in Tlaxcala.

== See also ==
- List of earthquakes in 2014
- List of earthquakes in Mexico
