= 1911 Guerrero earthquake =

Earthquake in Mexico

- Location within Mexico
- UTC time: 1911-12-16 19:14:32
- ISC event: 16958175
- USGS-ANSS: ComCat
- Local date: December 16, 1911
- Local time: 12:14
- Duration: ~ 2 minutes
- Magnitude: 7.6 M_{w} 7.8 M_{s}
- Depth: 50 km (31 mi)
- Epicenter: 17.0°N 100.5°W
- Areas affected: Mexico
- Max. intensity: MMI VII (Very strong)
- Casualties: 28 dead

The 1911 Guerrero earthquake occurred on December 16 at 12:14 local time near the coast of Guerrero, Mexico along the Mexican subduction zone. The earthquake's energy was calculated using several different magnitude scales with an estimated moment magnitude of 7.6 and a surface-wave magnitude of 7.8. Following the event, telegraphy reports came in from a broad area of Mexico. Cities from Guadalajara, Mérida (on the Yucatán Peninsula), and Tapachula (near Guatemala) all reported the tremors. The earthquake lasted over two minutes and resulted in the deaths of 28 people.

== Tectonic setting ==
In the region, the Cocos, North American, and Caribbean plates converge and create a tectonic zone of consistent and long term seismicity. Guerrero is located where the Cocos plate is being subducted under the North American plate, and the rupture area of the earthquake may have occurred in the Guerrero seismic gap, which is a 200 kilometers (120 mi) stretch along the Middle America Trench that had not experienced movement nearly as often as nearby segments of the subduction zone.

The convergence rate of the Cocos and North American plates in the Guerrero seismic gap varies between 53–58 millimeters (2.1–2.3 in) annually. This level of precision was made possible after the installation of permanent GPS monitoring stations, the first of which was installed in 1997 at Cayaco, Guerrero. The gap was defined as having a northwest section and a southeast section. The most recent significant events in the southeast sector were the 1907 and 1957 Guerrero earthquakes with respective magnitudes of 7.9 and 7.8. The 2007 report stated that the northwestern zone has not experienced a significant release of energy since the December 1911 event.

== Damage ==
There were reports of walls and fences being damaged and part of a market's roofing frame falling and causing injury. The electricity had been cut for a time in Mexico City. The greatest damage may have occurred in Chilpancingo, the capital city of Guerrero.

According to the El Paso Herald issued on December 18, people in Mexico City rushed to the Zócalo running aimlessly or praying during the earthquake. Then Mexican president Francisco I. Madero, conferring with some of his cabinet members at the moment, was standing in front of a window in the National Palace, watching the scene, laughing without fear, and remained there until the earthquake stopped.

== See also ==
- List of earthquakes in 1911
- List of earthquakes in Mexico
