= 1787 New Spain earthquake =

Earthquake in Kingdom of the Spanish Empire

- Location within Mexico
- Local date: 28 March 1787
- Local time: 11:30
- Magnitude: 8.6 M_{w}
- Epicenter: 16.5°N 98.5°W
- Type: Megathrust
- Areas affected: New Spain
- Total damage: Severe
- Tsunami: Yes
- Casualties: 11 killed in the tsunami, total unknown

The 1787 New Spain earthquake, also known as the San Sixto earthquake, occurred on 28 March at 11:30 local time (17:30 UTC). It caused a large tsunami that affected the coast of the Puebla Intendancy (includes the current state of Guerrero) and the Oaxaca Intendancy (currently Oaxaca) in Southwestern New Spain (currently part of Mexico). With an estimated magnitude of 8.6 on the moment magnitude scale, it was more powerful than any instrumentally recorded Mexican earthquake.

== Tectonic setting ==
Southwestern Mexico lies above the convergent boundary where the Cocos plate is being subducted below the North American plate at a rate of 6.4 cm/yr. The dip of the subducting slab is about 15° as defined by focal mechanisms and earthquake hypocenters. Seismicity in this area is characterised by regular megathrust earthquakes along the plate interface.

== Earthquake ==
The earthquake was reported as lasting between 6 and 7 minutes. It was followed by three strong aftershocks on 29 March, 30 March, and 3 April, all of which were probably of magnitude 7 or more, based on estimates of the reported intensities in the city of Oaxaca. It was felt over a wide area from Valladolid to Tehuantepec along the coast and as far inland as Tulancingo. The magnitude of this earthquake has been estimated from contemporary reports of seismic intensity. Analysis of other subduction interface earthquakes along this margin suggest that the extent of shaking of VIII or greater on the Mercalli intensity scale matches well with the rupture extent for each event. This suggests that the 1787 rupture extended for about 450 km along the coast, providing an estimate of magnitude 8.6, based on scaling against other similar earthquakes.

== Tsunami ==
The tsunami triggered by the earthquake affected the Mexican Pacific coast for more than 500 km along the shores of Oaxaca, Guerrero and Chiapas. The maximum wave height has been estimated as 18.5 m, based on records of inundation and current elevations.

== Damage ==
The earthquake caused damage to buildings in Mexico City and many buildings in Oaxaca City were destroyed. Three churches in Teuchitlan were destroyed.

== Future earthquake hazard ==
The rupture behaviour of the subduction interface in the area of the 1787 earthquake involves occasional very large earthquakes, such as that in 1787, with smaller (M7) earthquakes rupturing just part of the plate boundary during the intervening period. Similar behaviour has been observed along the Colombia-Ecuador subduction zone, with three M7 earthquakes since the M8.8 1906 Ecuador–Colombia earthquake rupturing just part of the same area that slipped in that great earthquake.

== See also ==
- List of earthquakes in Mexico
- List of historical earthquakes
- List of tsunamis
