= National Seismological Service =

Organization

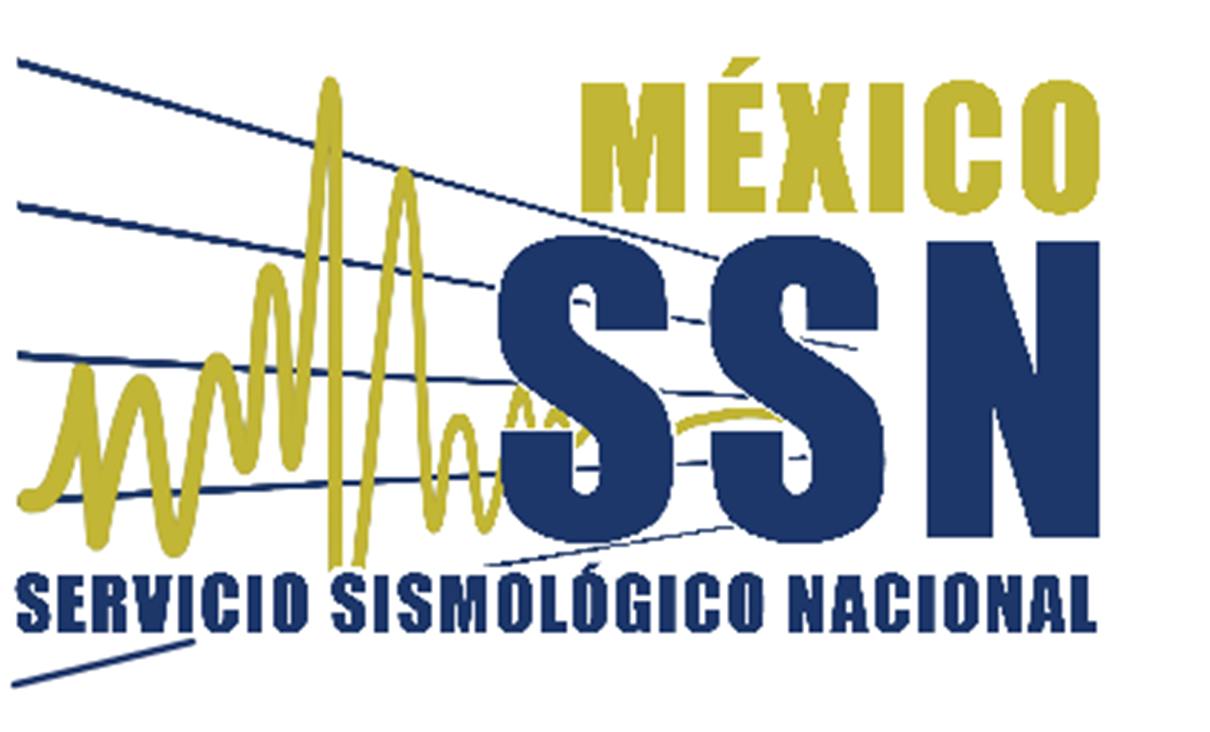

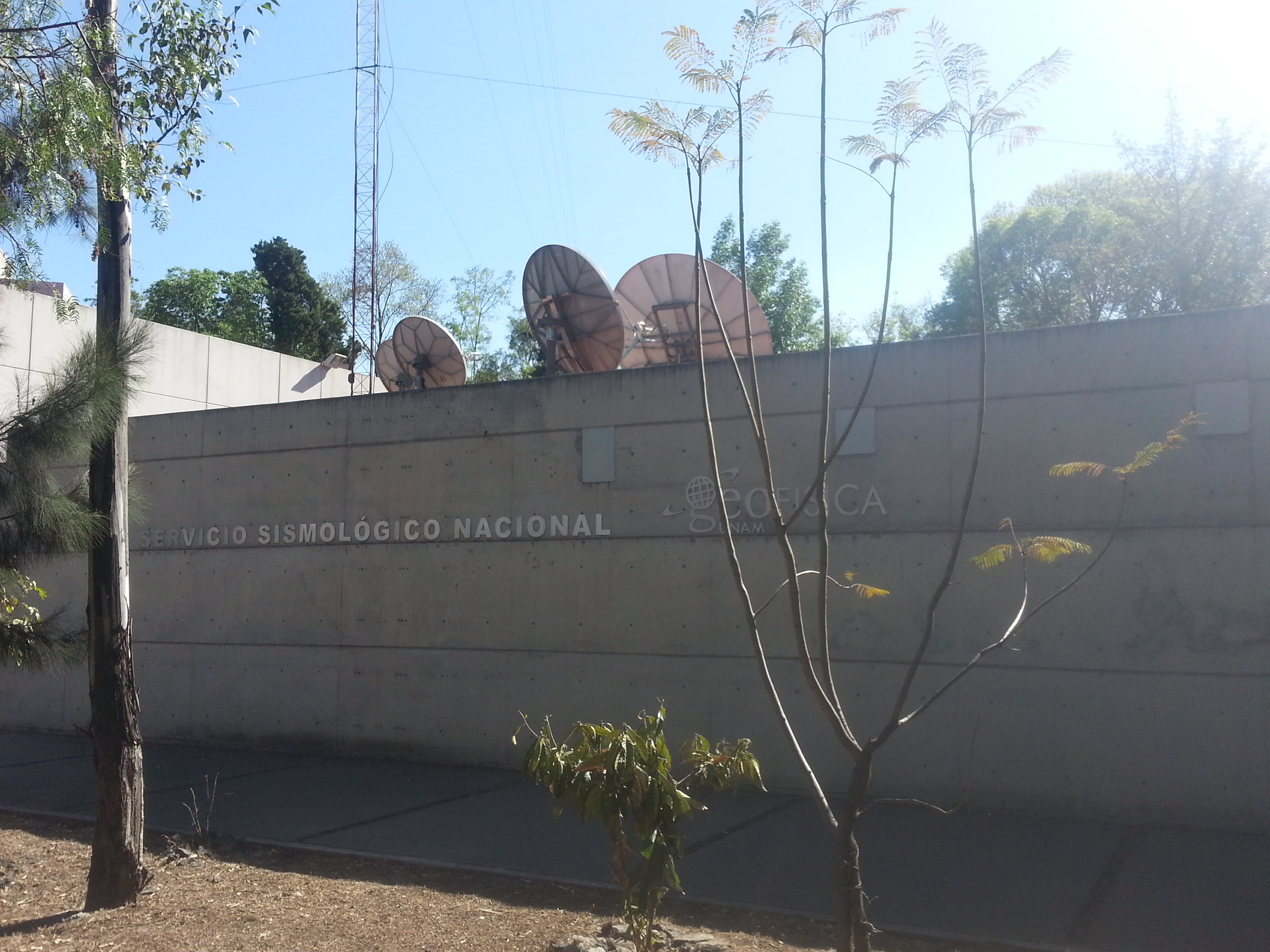
- Formation: September 5, 1910
- Type: Seismological service
- Headquarters: Mexico City, Mexico
- Website: www.ssn.unam.mx

The National Seismological Service (Spanish: Servicio Sismológico Nacional, SSN) is a seismological organization in Mexico that studies and records earthquake activity within the country. It is part of the Geophysics Institute at the National Autonomous University of Mexico (UNAM) and is based in Mexico City. It operates Mexico’s national seismological network, keeps records of earthquakes

The SSN was founded on September 5, 1910, by the federal government as part of an international effort to monitor seismic activity. The SSN established its first nine earthquake monitoring stations were installed between 1910 and 1923, including seven that have operated continuously since as the oldest system in North America.

It was transferred to UNAM in 1929 and became part of the UNAM Geophysics Institute in 1948.

The National Seismological Service keeps the seismological records accumulated since January 20, 1900. There are more than 201 thousand earthquakes in catalog and paper records since 1906. Since 1958 it has a very high-quality database with seismic data. All these data are in the process of digitization to be stored in the Earth Sciences Library.The institution also works as a research center, mainly for scientists of the National Autonomous University of Mexico, but also from the Instituto Politécnico Nacional and other state universities.

The institution cooperated with others such as the Incorporated Research Institutions for Seismology (IRIS), USGS and the Pacific Tsunami Warning Center (PTWC)

Currently Mexico’s national seismological network has 98 seismic observatories, 68 broadband stations and 30 in the Valley of Mexico. The broadband stations transmit via satellite about a thousand data packages per second in real time, whether there's an earthquake or not. Each package contains speed, acceleration and GPS position among others, with 100 samples per second. A number of portable monitoring stations have been installed in Mexico City, making it the most supervised city in Latin America.

An alternate monitoring center is on the works in Pachuca, Hidalgo, as a redundancy outside the risk zone of Mexico City.
