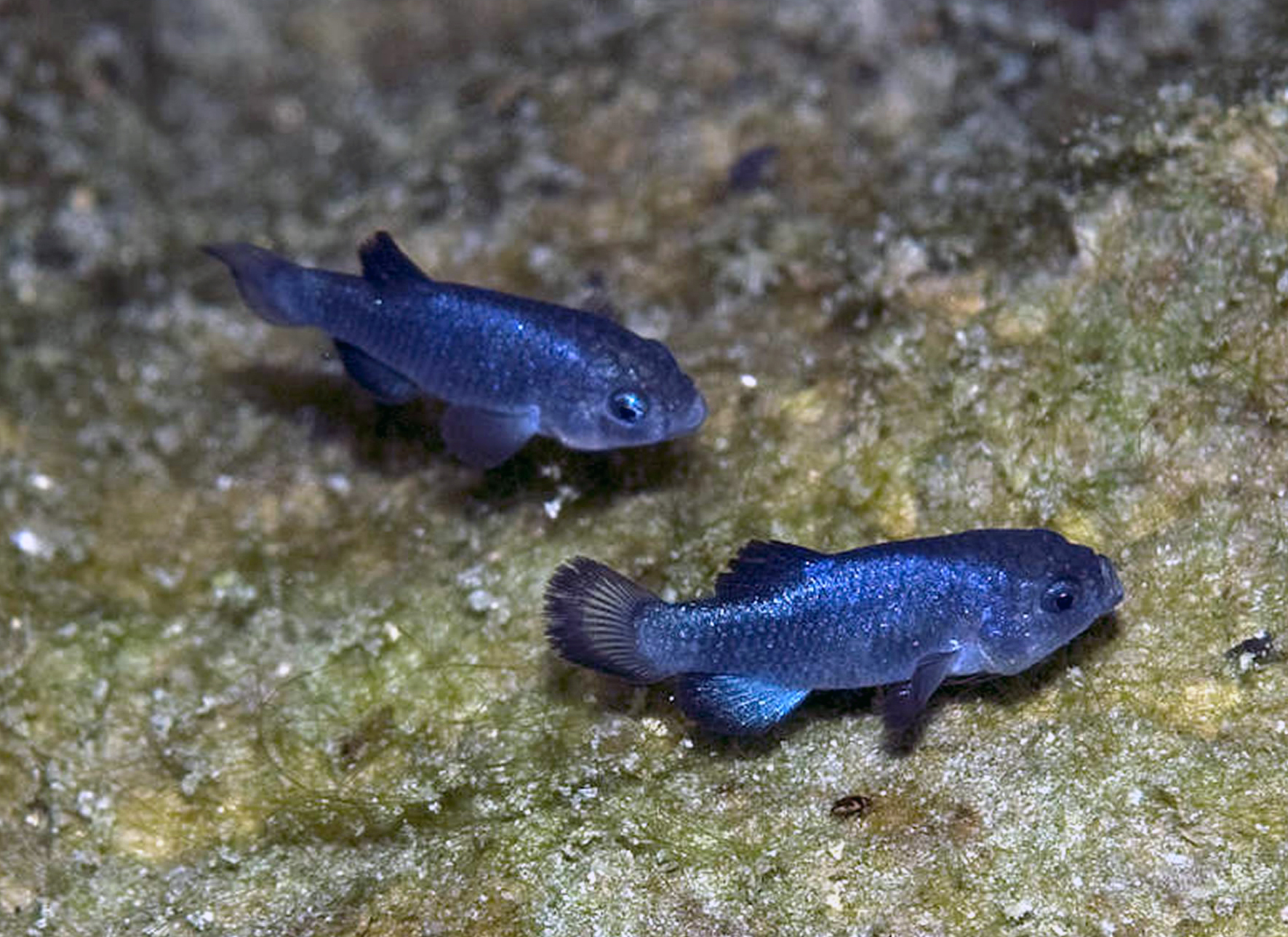

Conservation status
- Critically Endangered (IUCN 3.1)

- Endangered (ESA)

Scientific classification
- Kingdom: Animalia
- Phylum: Chordata
- Class: Actinopterygii
- Division: Teleostei
- Order: Cyprinodontiformes
- Family: Cyprinodontidae
- Genus: Cyprinodon
- Species: C. diabolis

Binomial name
- Cyprinodon diabolis Wales, 1930

= Devils Hole pupfish =

Rare species of fish native to Nevada, U.S.

The Devils Hole pupfish (Cyprinodon diabolis) is a critically endangered species of the family Cyprinodontidae (pupfishes) found only in Devils Hole, a water-filled cavern in the US state of Nevada. It was first described as a species in 1930 and is most closely related to C. nevadensis and the Death Valley pupfish (C. salinus). The age of the species is unknown, with differing analyses offering ranges between one thousand and sixty thousand years. It is a small fish, with maximum lengths of up to 30 mm (1.2 in). Individuals vary in coloration based on age and sex: males are bright metallic blue while females and juveniles are more yellow. A defining trait of this species is its lack of pelvic fins. The pupfish consumes nearly every available food resource at Devils Hole, including beetles, snails, algae, and freshwater crustaceans, with diet varying throughout the year. It is preyed on by the predaceous diving beetle species Neoclypeodytes cinctellus, which was first observed in Devils Hole in 1999 or 2000. Reproduction occurs year-round, with spikes in the spring and fall. Females produce few eggs and the survivorship from egg to adult is low. Individuals live 10–14 months.

Devils Hole is more than 130 m (430 ft) deep, though pupfish are only found in the upper 24 m (80 ft). The water is a constant temperature of 33 °C (91 °F) and dissolved oxygen levels are low. A small, shallowly submerged rock shelf provides critical feeding and spawning habitat for the pupfish. Nearby agricultural irrigation in the 1960s and 1970s caused the water to drop in Devils Hole, resulting in less and less of the shelf remaining submerged. Several court cases ensued, resulting in the Supreme Court case Cappaert v. United States, which determined that the preservation of Devils Hole as a National Monument in 1952 implicitly included preservation of adequate groundwater to maintain the scientific value of the pool and its fauna. Other threats faced by the species include flash floods, earthquakes, and vandalism.

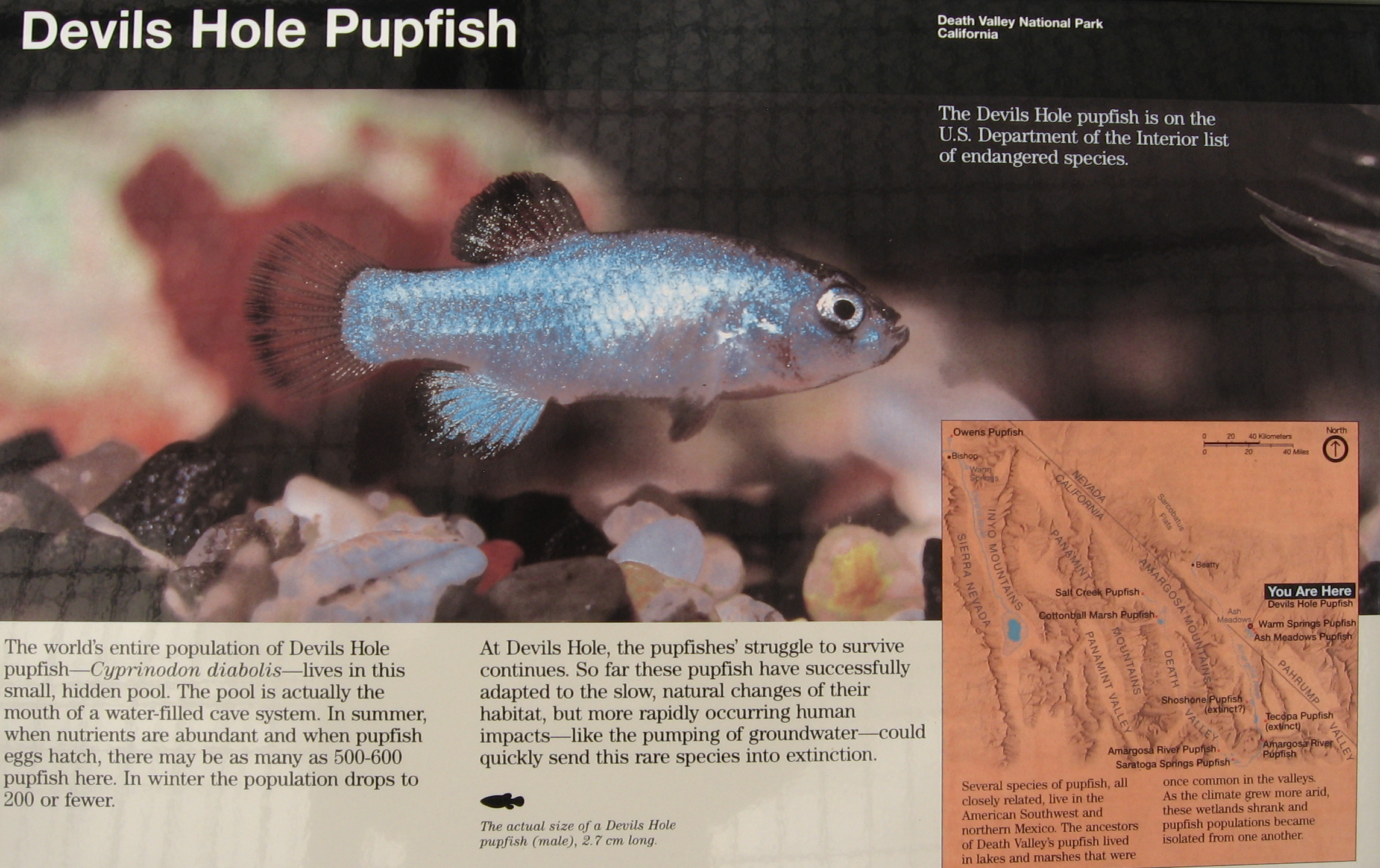
Devils Hole Pupfish sign

As its entire native range is a single locality, efforts to create other populations have proceeded since the 1960s and 1970s, most of which have failed. Three refugia were created in 1972, 1973, and 1990, though all were closed by 2007 as a result of maintenance failures, hybridization, and small founder populations. In the early 2010s, an exact replica of the uppermost 6.7 m (22 ft) of Devils Hole was constructed at Ash Meadows Fish Conservation Facility, which was populated with eggs taken from Devils Hole in winter months when development into adults is unlikely. Efforts to conserve the wild population have included removing sediment from the shallow shelf, adding supplemental food, and installing fences and security cameras to keep unauthorized people away. Conservation efforts have been costly and divisive. During the legal battle over ground water in the 1960s and 1970s, bumper stickers were distributed that read "Kill the Pupfish" or "Save the Pupfish". Some have argued that the species should be allowed to go extinct, while others have said this would be akin to "bombing the Louvre to make way for a parking lot".

Population counts are conducted twice a year, in the spring and fall, with the fall population usually much larger. Since 1972, population counts have peaked at around 550 individuals. The April 2013 count showed only 35 remaining in the wild, but the numbers recovered, and by September 2022, the count showed a total of 263 observed wild pupfish. However, after winter earthquakes swept algae off of the spawning shelf, the Spring 2025 count showed only 38 fish remaining. The Devils Hole pupfish has been listed as endangered by the US federal government since 1967 and critically endangered by the International Union for Conservation of Nature since 2014.

== Taxonomy and evolution ==
- - C. fontinalis
  - - C. salinus
    - - C. nevadensis
      - C. diabolis

Position of C. diabolis relative to some other members of its genus

The Devils Hole pupfish was described as a new species in 1930 by American ichthyologist Joseph H. Wales. The holotype had been collected by Wales and George S. Myers in March 1930 at Devils Hole in the US state of Nevada. The species name "diabolis" was chosen to allude to the type locality of Devils Hole. Both the species name and the location spell "Devils Hole" without an apostrophe, a relic of the "quirks of government cartographers and scientists". According to genetic analysis, the sister taxon of the Devils Hole pupfish is Cyprinodon nevadensis. Along with the Death Valley pupfish (C. salinus), the three Amargosa River basin species form a clade.

The age of the species is subject to considerable debate, with analyses recovering starkly different figures. Devils Hole was formed around 60,000 years ago, with some researchers assuming the pupfish has existed in isolation for 10,000–20,000 years. How it colonized Devils Hole is unknown; hypotheses include arriving via subterranean waters or over dry land. As Native Americans used pupfish species as food, it has been speculated that they introduced the pupfish to Devils Hole, intentionally or not. Its divergence from a common ancestor with C. nevadensis mionectes was estimated at 217–2530 years in one study. Two studies, each based on independent genetic datasets, estimated that this species may have first colonized the hole within the past 1,000 years, but another suggested the species is as old as 60,000 years. These estimates depend heavily on knowledge of the mutation rate in this species, which is unknown, but is predicted to be one of the highest for any vertebrate due to its small population size.

== Description ==
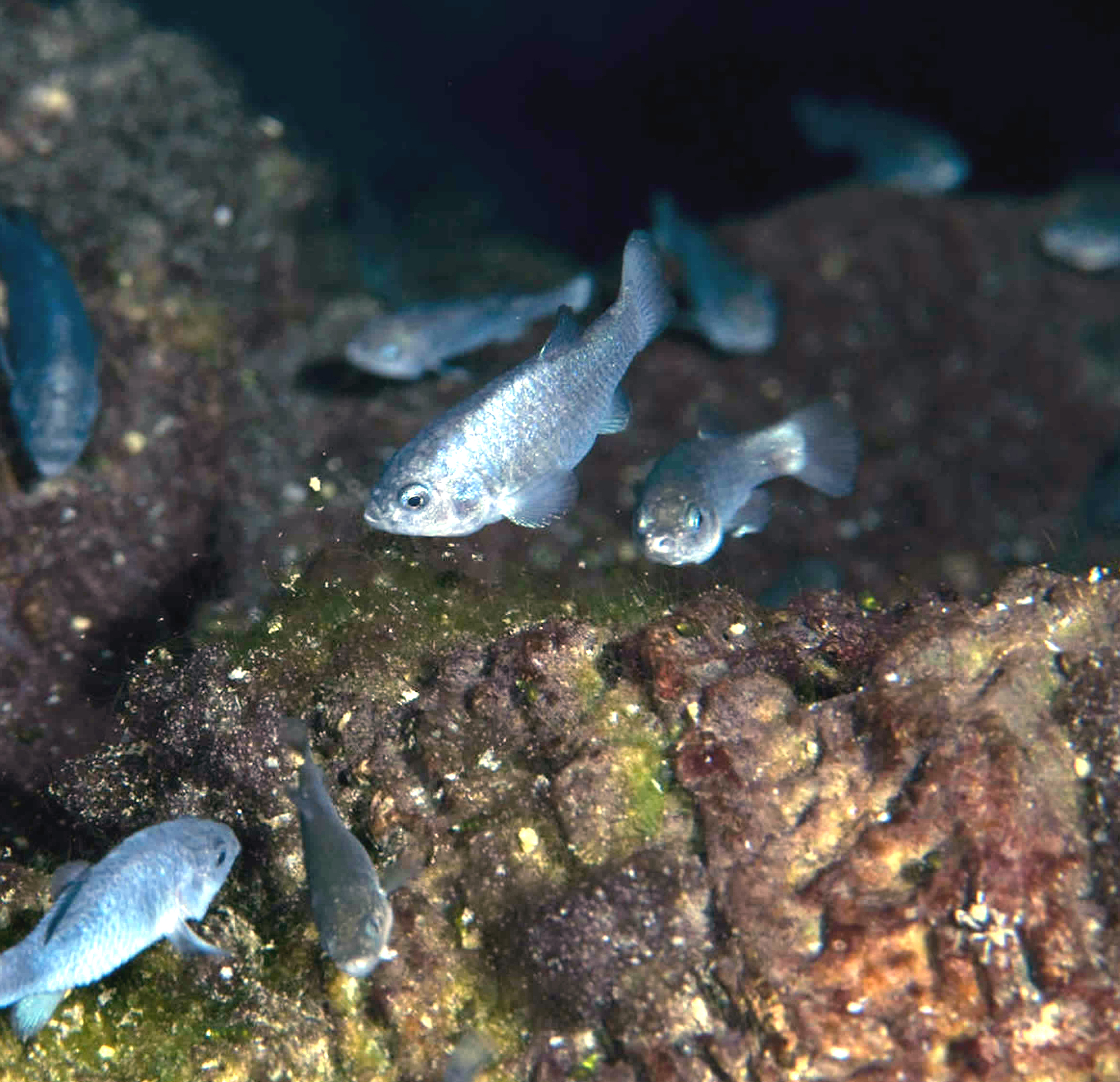
Group of Devils Hole pupfish at Devils Hole

The Devils Hole pupfish is the smallest pupfish species in the genus Cyprinodon, with lengths up to 30 mm (1.2 in). The average length is 23 mm (0.9 in). Males and females differ in coloration. Males are overall dark brown with metallic blue on their sides. The margins of all fins are black, and the back has golden iridescence. Iridescence is particularly pronounced on the opercles (gill covers) which have a violet sheen on their posterior side. The iris is blue and also iridescent. Females and young are more yellow in color than the males. Females have yellowish-brown backs, and the margins of their pectoral and caudal fins are yellow, not black. The dorsal fin has a black margin like the males, however. Females' opercles are metallic green, and their eyes are tinted metallic blue. The young are overall colored as the females, though they have a faint vertical bar on their sides.

Individuals lack pelvic fins, though have been observed to grow them when raised in lower temperatures in captivity. Its dorsal fin has twelve rays, while each pectoral fin has seventeen rays. The caudal fin is convex in appearance and has twenty-eight rays, curving outward at the margin. Its lateral series (the number of scales from the back end of the opercle to the beginning of the tail) is twenty-seven scales. The scales are ctenoid, or toothed, on the outer margin.

== Biology and ecology ==
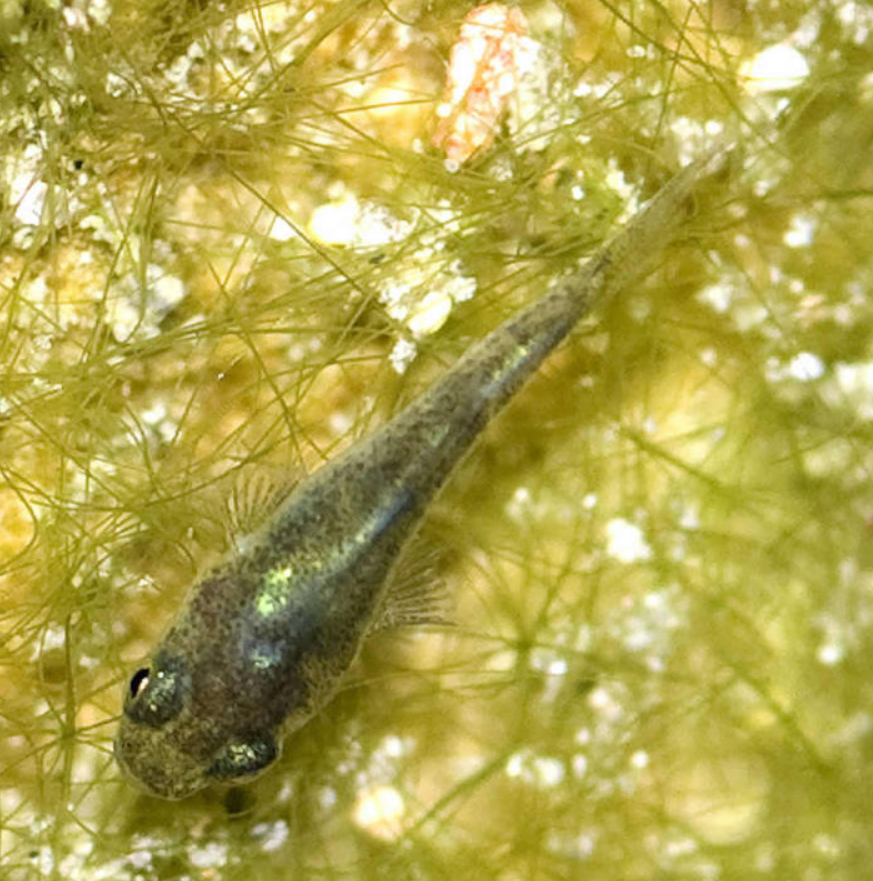
Larva of the Devils Hole pupfish

The Devils Hole pupfish consumes a variety of food items representing nearly all possible food resources in Devils Hole. Its food resources include inorganic particulate matter; the algae Spirogyra and diatoms; the freshwater crustaceans Hyalella azteca and ostracods; protozoa; the beetle Stenelmis calida; the flatworm Girardia dorotocephala; and the freshwater snails Tryonia. The consumption of the various food resources varies seasonally, though inorganic particulate matter had a high frequency of occurrence in stomach contents year-round in one study. The inorganic particulate matter consists of primarily travertine, a form of limestone. The three most common food items for each season by frequency of occurrence were:

- Spring (March through May): inorganic particulate matter (83%), diatoms (75%), and Spirogyra (58%)
- Summer (June through August): inorganic particulate matter (79%), Spirogyra (46%), and diatoms (46%)
- Autumn (September through November): inorganic particulate matter (95%), Spirogyra (74%), and Hyalella azteca (33%)
- Winter (December through February): inorganic particulate matter (100%), diatoms (91%), and ostracods (45%)

As Spirogyra was mostly found undigested in the stomach, the authors hypothesized that it was not important as a food resource, but rather as a foraging substrate. The inorganic particulate matter was thought to be incidentally consumed as well as a result of the fish's foraging strategy of bottom feeding and surface feeding.

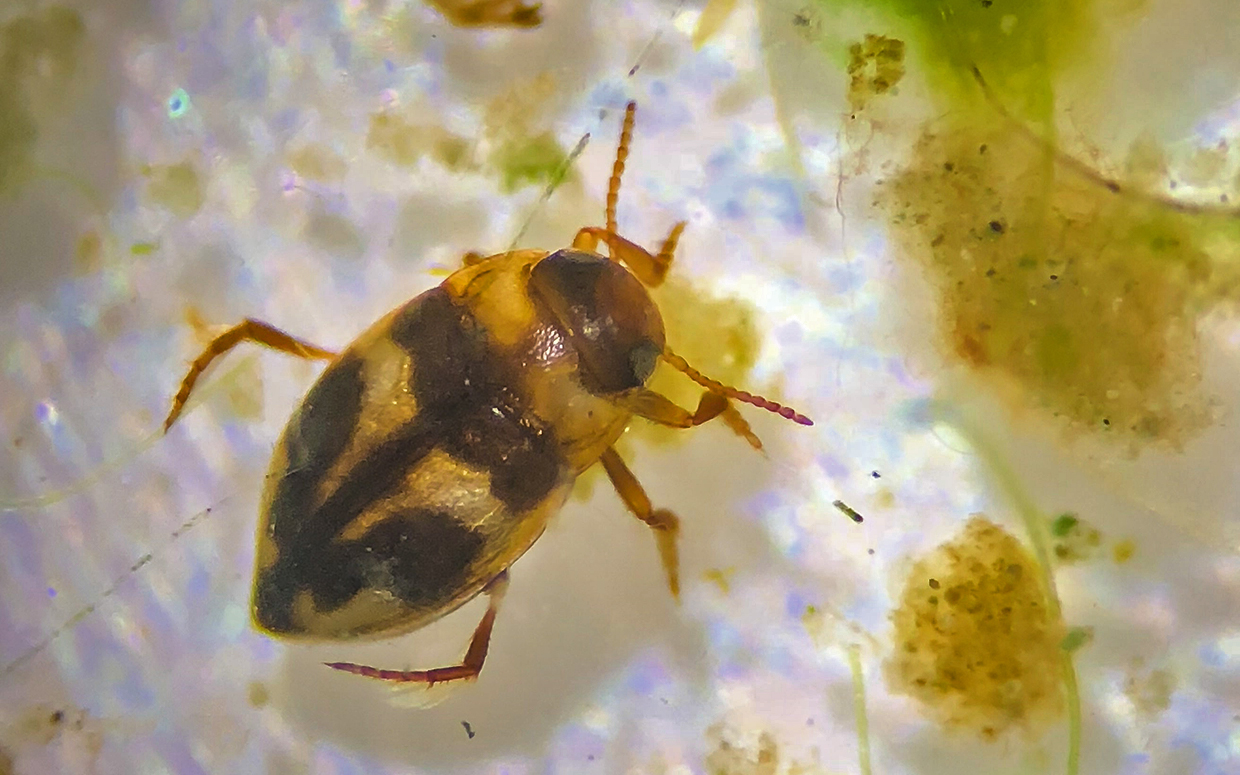
Predaceous diving beetle (Neoclypeodytes cinctellus) found in Devils Hole

Predators of the Devils Hole pupfish include the diving beetle species Neoclypeodytes cinctellus, which consumes its eggs and juveniles. N. cinctellus likely also preys on some of the same invertebrates as does the Devils Hole pupfish, meaning that it is a competitor as well as a predator. The diving beetle only recently became part of the ecosystem, and was first documented at Devils Hole in 1999 or 2000.

Although spawning year-round, spawning peaks from mid-February to mid-May with a smaller peak from July to September. Devils Hole pupfish females have low fecundity, which is the capacity to create offspring. The average female may only produce four or five mature ova (egg cells) each breeding season. Mature ova represent 10–20% of the total number of ova produced. During each spawn, a mature female is thought to produce only a single egg, which are only 1 mm (0.039 in) in diameter. In addition to its low fecundity, eggs have low hatching success and juveniles have low rates of survival. Individuals have a lifespan of 10–14 months.

Because the rock shelf upon which the fish feed and breed is susceptible to seismic activity, specialized behavior mitigates the impact of earthquakes. When a disturbance such as an earthquake occurs, it causes the fish to flee en masse into the depths, and begin a spawning event that may be out of season. During spawning brought upon by a disturbance, several males chase lone females until they become receptive, at which point the female allows one of the males to swim next to her. The female then lays an egg that the male immediately fertilizes.

The Devils Hole pupfish has daily and seasonal movement within the Hole. Around midday, when incoming sunlight is at its maximum intensity on the shallow shelf, the number of fish on the shelf decreases. This tendency to leave the shelf at midday is most pronounced April through September. From December to March, when the shallow shelf receives little if any direct sunlight at midday, the number of fish on the shelf increases as the day advances. In the summer months when the shelf receives the most sunlight, fish are overall less likely to use the shallow shelf.

Having adapted to an environment with low oxygen saturation, the Devils Hole pupfish has developed a behavior known as "paradoxical anaerobism". The fish enters a state of torpor, and has been known to forego breathing oxygen for up to two hours. As a byproduct of this alternate respiration method, the fish produces ethanol.

== Habitat ==
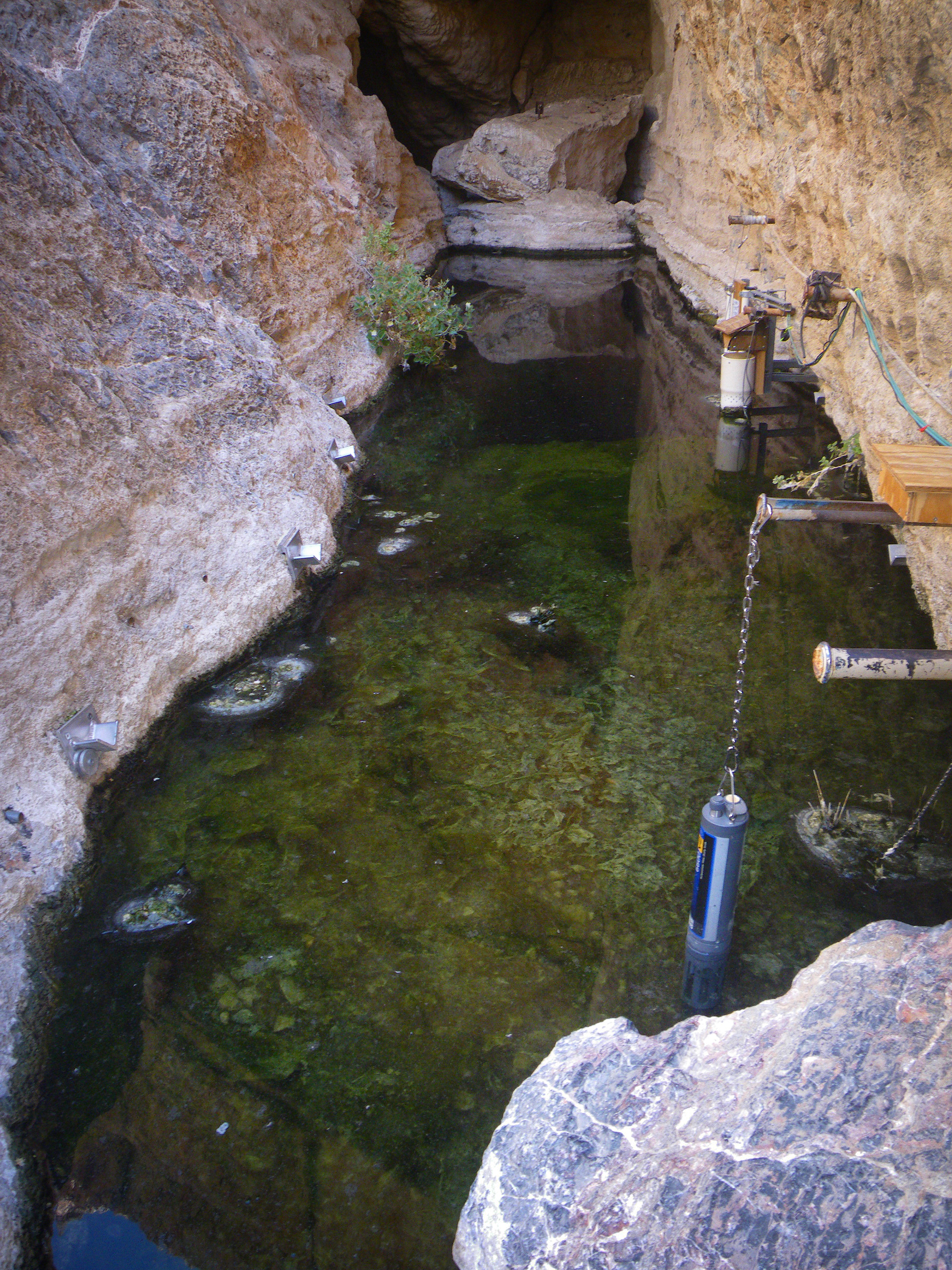
Nearly the entire natural range of the species is visible in this photo. The equipment is used to monitor the water level.

Devils Hole and the pupfish are located in the Amargosa Desert ecosystem, in the Amargosa Valley, of southwestern Nevada, US, east of Death Valley and the Funeral Mountains and Amargosa Range. The Amargosa River is part of Devils Hole and the region's aquifer hydrology. Devils Hole is a water-filled cavern extending into a hillside. It is at an elevation of 730 m (2,400 ft) above sea level and the water is a constant temperature of 33 °C (91 °F). The surface area of Devils Hole is about 22 m long by 3.5 m wide (72 ft long by 11.5 ft wide). Its depth is at least 130 m (430 ft). Devils Hole "may be the smallest habitat in the world containing the entire population of a vertebrate species". Approximately 0.3 m (0.98 ft) deep on one end of Devils Hole is a small rock shelf of 3.5 by 5 m (11 by 16 ft). The dissolved oxygen of the water is 2.5–3.0 ppm up to around 22 m (72 ft) in depth, though the shallow shelf can have dissolved oxygen levels as high as 6.0–7.0 ppm in June and July.

Although pupfish have been found as deep as 24 metres (80 ft), their numbers are most dense above depths of 15 m (49 ft). They depend on the shallow shelf for spawning as well as for much of their diet which primarily consists of diatoms. Natural threats from flash floods to earthquakes have been known to disrupt this fragile ecosystem, but in the 1960s and 1970s, the major threat was groundwater depletion due to agricultural irrigation.

Research indicates that the annual population fluctuation is in response to the amount of algae on the shallow shelf, which is dependent on incoming solar radiation and nutrient levels. Nutrient availability may peak when the cave is used by barn owls as a roosting or nesting site, as their nutrient-rich pellets fall into the water.

== Conservation and status ==
=== Threats ===
Seiche created by a 7.1 M earthquake at Devils Hole on 5 July 2019

The Devils Hole pupfish species is limited to a single site and highly susceptible to disturbance. In the 1970s, the species was threatened with groundwater depletion, as the withdrawal of groundwater lowered the water level of Devils Hole and limited their ability to spawn on the shallow shelf. After the groundwater withdrawal was limited, its population rebounded, but experienced a second decline from 1995 onward. The reasons for the second decline are unknown, but inbreeding depression, the loss of a prey species, changing algal and microbial communities, or shifting sediment dynamics have been hypothesized as potential factors. It could face threats in the future relating to climate change, as warming temperatures in the area are predicted to shorten the period of optimum recruitment, or the time when the next generation is produced and matures.

Large-scale earthquakes, such as the 2012 Guerrero–Oaxaca earthquake, the 2018 Gulf of Alaska earthquake and the 2019 Ridgecrest earthquakes, have caused standing waves known as seiches in Devils Hole, which can lead to an unseasonal spawning event due to the disruption of the pupfishes' environment. The waves caused by earthquakes can scour the algae from the rocks (as well as eggs and larvae), affecting the food supply and spawning grounds. Flash floods also disrupt the algae via debris swept into Devils Hole.

In addition to the indirect threat of groundwater depletion, human actions can impact the pupfish in other ways as well. A 2004 flash flood swept scientific monitoring equipment into Devils Hole, causing the deaths of an estimated eighty pupfish. In April 2016, three men broke into the Devils Hole protected area, destroying scientific equipment and wading onto the shallow shelf of Devils Hole, smashing pupfish eggs and larvae, as well as vomiting into the water.

Isolation over the course of thousands of years has led the Devils Hole pupfish to become what are believed to be one of the most inbred vertebrates on Earth, and the resulting high mutation load and genetic instability remains a potential long-term threat to the species as a whole.

=== Status designations and legal action ===
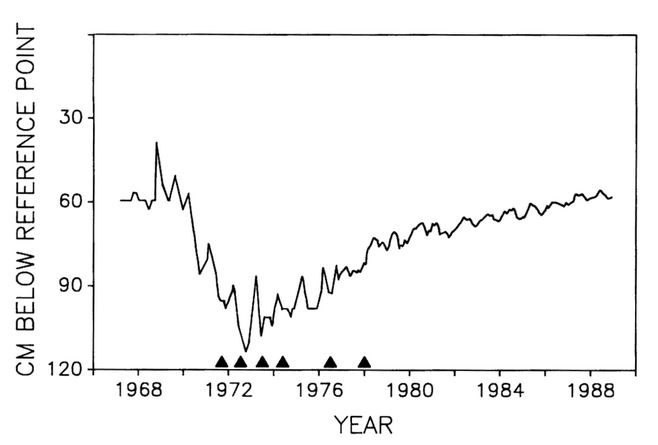
Water level at Devils Hole from 1967 to 1988. Points represent monthly mean maximums. Triangles on the x-axis correspond to 1) Suit filed in district court and three wells shut down (1971); 2) suit reactivated (1972); 3) preliminary injunction (1973); 4) permanent injunction (1974); 5) US Supreme Court ruling (1976); 6) final water level ordered by district court (1977).

In the late 1940s, ichthyologist Carl Leavitt Hubbs began campaigning for legal protection for Devils Hole and the pupfish. This led to President Harry S. Truman issuing a proclamation in 1952 that made Devils Hole part of Death Valley National Monument (now National Park). In 1956, the United States Geological Survey (USGS) installed the first water level recorder. The fish was officially listed as an endangered species in 1967, making it one of the first species protected under the Endangered Species Act.

In 1967, Spring Meadows, Inc. began purchasing large tracts of Ash Meadows, much from the Bureau of Land Management, in anticipation of developing 48.6 km^{2} (18.8 mi^{2}) of irrigated cropland. Many wells were drilled from 1967–1970, causing a decline of the water at Devils Hole by 1968. The level continued to drop through 1972, causing alarm as a 1969 study had determined that the shallow shelf was virtually the only feeding and spawning habitat available to the fish. Conservationists and public opinion began to rally for preservation of the pupfish, with a 1970 issue of the magazine Cry California stating that allowing it to go extinct would be "comparable to bombing the Louvre to make way for a parking lot". Two organizations were formed in support of the species: the Desert Fishes Council and the Desert Pupfish Task Force.

In 1970, the USGS began a study to determine why the water level was receding at Devils Hole, concluding that a substantial withdrawal of groundwater would negatively affect the water level, and thus, pupfish habitat. In August 1971, the U. S. Department of Justice filed a complaint on behalf of the Department of the Interior, seeking to stop Spring Meadows from using three wells identified as having the greatest impact on Devils Hole. The basis for the argument was that when Devils Hole became part of a National Monument in 1952, sufficient water was thus reserved "to serve the requirements and purposes of the monument". Later that month, Spring Meadows and the federal government made an agreement that they would cease operation of the three identified wells, and not increase withdrawal at their other wells to compensate. Though the water level briefly rose, it once again entered a decline, exposing more than half the shallow shelf by summer 1972. This caused the government to reactivate the suit in 1972. Now, they wanted Spring Meadows to cease using any wells within 4 km (2.5 mi) of Devils Hole for any non-domestic purpose based on the implied reservation doctrine established in Winters v. United States (1908). An injunction in favor of the government was issued in June 1973, which was appealed to the United States Court of Appeals for the Ninth Circuit (upheld in 1974) and the Supreme Court.

In the case Cappaert vs. U.S., decided in 1976, the Supreme Court upheld the injunction and determined that the district court should set the minimum water level necessary to ensure pupfish survival. The Court stated that by making Devils Hole part of a National Monument, the groundwater necessary to sustain the pupfish was implicitly reserved. In 1977 the district court determined that the water level minimum would be 0.82 m (2.7 ft) below a reference point on the wall.

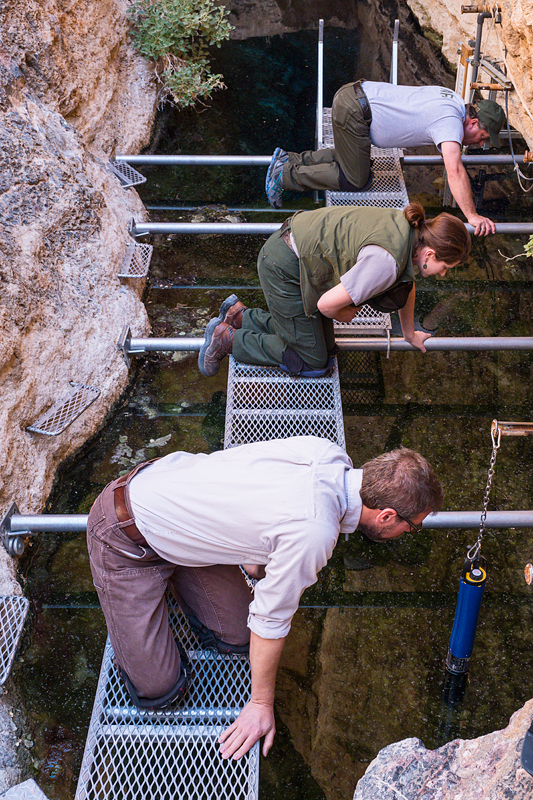
Researchers conducting a population count of the Devils Hole pupfish

In 1980, the U.S. Fish and Wildlife Service (USFWS) designated about 21,000 acres (8,500 ha) as essential habitat where the groundwater most influenced the water level in the Hole. One of the identified goals of the recovery plan was to maintain the aquifer at such levels that the population fluctuates from 300 in winter to 700–900 in late summer. The water source for Devils Hole pupfish were now protected from industrial use, but the rest of Ash Meadows was unprotected. When the USFWS declined to purchase the land from Cappaert Enterprises, Ash Meadows was sold in 1980 to a property development company, Preferred Equities Corporation, who acquired additional nearby land with the intention of creating 33,636 residential parcels altogether. As the original injunction limited water with exception to domestic purposes, it was unclear if residents of the proposed subdivision would have to limit water usage in respect to the water level of Devils Hole. In 1982, Secretary of the Interior James Watt approved the emergency listing of two more Ash Meadows fish, the Ash Meadows pupfish (Cyprinodon nevadensis mionectes) and the Ash Meadows speckled dace (Rhinichthys osculus nevadensis). Further development by Preferred Equities would therefore almost certainly violate the Endangered Species Act. After protracted negotiations, The Nature Conservancy (a nonprofit) was able to purchase Ash Meadows for $5.5 million in February 1984, with reimbursement from the U.S. Federal Government of $5 million. By June 1984, Ash Meadows National Wildlife Refuge was established, as The Nature Conservancy transferred the property to the government. By 1986, a recovery plan was drafted for all of Ash Meadows, encompassing Devils Hole.

As of 2014, Devils Hole pupfish is evaluated as a critically endangered species by the IUCN. The species meets the criteria for this designation due to its extremely small extent of occurrence and area of occupancy, both of which are less than 1 km^{2} (0.39 mi^{2}). Additionally, the species is found in a single locality and has a very small population, often with fewer than 100 mature individuals. In the state of Nevada, it is considered a protected species that is also endangered.

=== Recovery actions ===
==== In the wild ====
Shortly after 1956, a locked gate was installed in a rock crevice of Devils Hole to limit public access to the site. By 1970, as the shallow shelf was exposed by groundwater depletion, an artificial shelf was installed at Devils Hole. It was never used by the fish. In 2005, 1.7 m^{3} (60 ft^{3}) of sediment was removed from the shallow shelf to encourage feeding and spawning. While the number of larvae appeared to increase as a result, the population still experienced a net decline over the following year. In January 2006, biologists began supplementing the fish's food supply in response to observations of poor health and malnourishment. After vandalism resulted in the death of a pupfish in 2016, the National Park Service added additional barbed wire to the top of the fences surrounding Devils Hole, also installing more motion sensors and video cameras.

==== Ex situ conservation ====
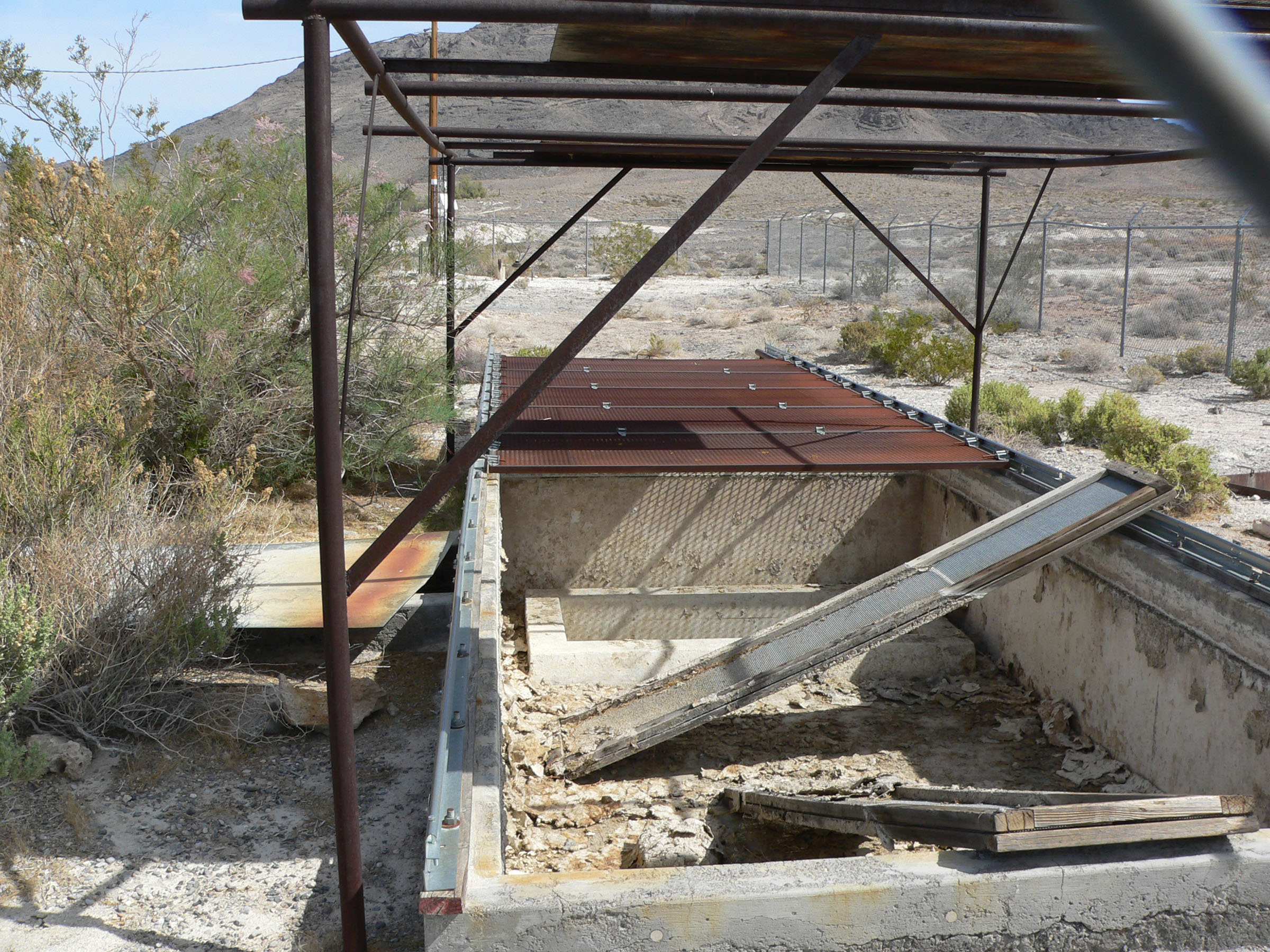
Pupfish refuge at School Springs, now defunct

Due to the fear of extinction in the 1960s and 1970s, several measures were taken to create multiple populations of the pupfish outside of Devils Hole to safeguard the species, which is known as ex situ conservation. Some of these measures, such as transplanting the fish into nearby natural springs, quickly failed. The fish disappeared, though one population at Purgatory Spring was destroyed by biologists, as the fish were misshapen and no longer looked like Devils Hole pupfish. Two attempts were made at this time to establish aquaria populations, one at Steinhardt Aquarium and the other at Fresno State College, though these also failed. A number of artificial "refugia" consisting of concrete tanks approximating conditions in Devils Hole were attempted to ensure the species' survival should the natural population at Devils Hole die out. The Hoover Dam Refugium for Endangered Desert Fish was established in August 1972, with the first twenty-seven pupfish translocated in October 1972. The Hoover Dam Refugium was successfully maintained for several years and reached a population of several hundred, though the sex ratio was highly skewed towards males with as many as three males per female. In 1985 or 1986, a component of the water supply system failed, however, killing many of the fish. Nearly all the remaining fish were killed by October 1986 when an additional failure caused the water temperature to drop drastically. The lone surviving fish was then removed. In 1973, a second refugium was established at Ash Meadows National Wildlife Refuge (AMNWR), the Amargosa Pupfish Station, also known as the School Springs refuge. From the founding population of twenty-five fish, it remained at several dozen individuals until a power failure in August 1984 disrupted the water flow, reducing the population to seven. The population increased to 121 by October 1987. In 1990, a third refugium was constructed, also at AMNWR, called Point of Rocks refuge.

Historical attempts to maintain the refugia populations through traditional methods has been largely ineffective, blamed on the small founder population size of each refugium as well as maintenance failures. The Point of Rocks refuge population unexpectedly had individuals appear with pelvic fins, which are not found in the species. Genetic evidence showed that around three individuals of the closely related C. nevadensis, which do have pelvic fins, invaded Point of Rocks between 1997 and 2005, hybridizing with the Devils Hole pupfish. The C. nevadensis genes quickly became highly prevalent in the gene pool, with researchers concluding, "...we add hybridization to the long list of problems that have conspired against successful propagation of C. diabolis in artificial settings outside of its native habitat". The School Springs population was extirpated in 2003, the Hoover Dam refugia population became extirpated once more in 2006, and the Point of Rocks refuge was extirpated in 2007.

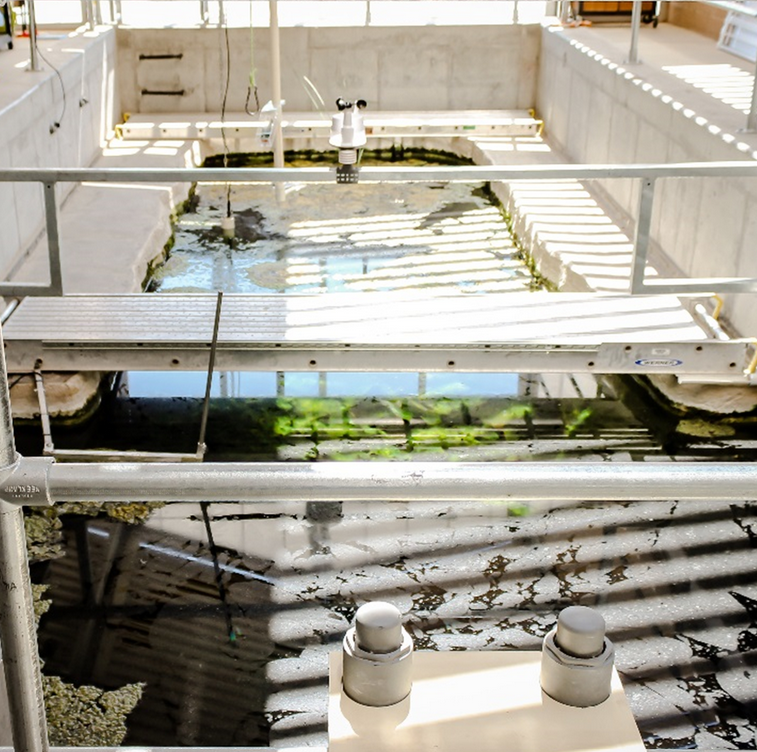
Devils Hole pupfish tank as viewed from above at the Ash Meadows Fish Conservation facility

In May through August 2006, two pupfish from Devils Hole and five from the Hoover Dam Refuge were transferred to a Las Vegas Strip casino aquarium at Mandalay Bay with the hope of understanding how to breed the species in aquaria. Propagation efforts at Mandalay Bay failed, and by April 2007 all individuals had died or been transferred. Also in 2006, six younger pupfish were moved from Devils Hole to the Willow Beach National Fish Hatchery in Arizona. Additionally, the eighteen remaining individuals from the Hoover Dam refuge were moved to Willow Beach. While early breeding efforts appeared successful and four larvae survived to adulthood, all individuals had died by December 2006, possibly from a form of leukemia.

In the early 2010s, a full-scale replica of the upper 6.7 m (22 ft) of Devils Hole was built at the new Ash Meadows Fish Conservation Facility (AMFCF), resulting in a 380,000 L (100,000 U.S. gal) tank. Located less than a mile away (36°25′25″N 116°18′21″W), this refuge closely mimics the natural Devils Hole, including water chemistry, spawning shelf, and natural sunlight. It intentionally differs, however, in temperature and dissolved oxygen content. The temperature is 2–3 °C (3.6–5.4 °F) cooler than that of Devils Hole and the dissolved oxygen content is doubled in attempts to reduce thermal and respiratory stress on the fish.

The population of Devils Hole pupfish at AMFCF was created by taking eggs from Devils Hole. However, eggs are only removed at times of the year when it is unlikely that they would develop into mature adults, such as in the winter. It is thought that egg removal during this time would therefore have the least impact on the population size at Devils Hole. When transferred to AMFCF, the eggs are exposed to anti-fungal, anti-bacterial, and anti-parasite treatments. They are reared in the aquarium until adulthood, at which point they are transferred to the large refuge tank. This procedure is also followed for eggs laid in the refuge tank. While efforts have been made to remove the predaceous beetle Neoclypeodytes cinctellus from the captive population's tank to lessen its depredation on eggs, it has not been removed from Devils Hole. It is unknown how removal of the species could affect the Devils Hole ecosystem, and the number of beetles in Devils Hole is less than in the tank hosting the captive population.

As of 2021, the efforts of the Ash Meadows Fish Conservation Facility have been considered "very successful" in maintaining a refuge population. At least fifty captive fish populated the refuge as of 2019, with an additional 10–20 in propagation tanks.

==== Costs and public opinion ====
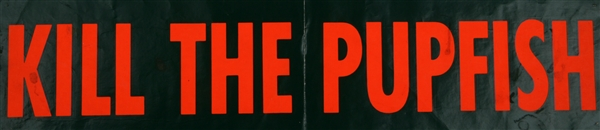
Bumper sticker from the 1960s expressing animosity towards the Devils Hole pupfish

Millions of dollars have been spent conserving the Devils Hole pupfish. The construction of the Ash Meadows Fish Conservation Facility alone, which opened in 2013, was estimated to cost $4.5 million. Conservation efforts from January 2006 to May 2007 were $750,000. The legal case over the rights to extract groundwater concluded that the Cappaert family, who invested $7 million into opening a ranch in the area, could no longer withdraw the same amount of water. The Cappaert family's attorney decried that the Supreme Court had chosen the interests of a fish over people, and a newspaper editor from nearby Pahrump threatened to dump a pesticide into Devils Hole to kill them all. In response to bumper stickers that read "Save the Pupfish" distributed by the Desert Fishes Council, Nye County Commissioner Robert Rudd produced bumper stickers that said "Kill the Pupfish". The Cappaert family sold the ranch in the late 1970s.

=== Population trends ===
Population surveys of the Devils Hole pupfish began in 1972. Population counts since then have been conducted using the same methods, with scuba diving researchers counting fish starting at depths of 30 m (100 ft) while researchers above the water count the individuals on the shallow shelf. Surveys are carried out twice a year, once during the spring season and once during fall.

From 1970 through 1996, the average population was 324. Population highs were recorded in 1980, 1990, and 1995 at counts of 541–548 individuals. Since 2005, the population at Devils Hole has been below 200 individuals, although the population fluctuates depending on the season. Low algae growth and other winter conditions cause spring populations to be 35–65% of the autumn population. The reasons for the decline are unclear. A 2014 study ascertained that the Devils Hole pupfish had a 26–33% chance of becoming extinct in the next twenty years.

In November 2005, divers counted just 84 individuals in the Devils Hole population, the same as the spring population, despite observations of egg-laying and juvenile fish during the summer. In 2007, between 38 and 42 fish were left in Devils Hole.

The pupfish count rose in the autumn of 2008 to 126, the first steady increase in more than 10 years. As of April 2013 U.S. Fish and Wildlife reported only 35 fish remain in their natural habitat, but increased to 92 when measured again in 2014. As of spring 2016, a periodic count found 115 of the fish living in the waters. In spring 2019, the pupfish population reached 136, the highest springtime population since 2003.

Population counts were suspended in 2020 due to the COVID-19 pandemic; however, egg collection for ex situ cultivation continued. Observers noted encouraging signs of population growth, and during the next count in April 2022, 175 pupfish were observed. The population has continued to grow, with 263 observed pupfish in September 2022. In spring 2024 the population was 191 individuals, the highest springtime count in 25 years. Increased nutrients for algae growth, swept into Devils Hole by runoff from Hurricane Hilary in 2023, may have contributed to the pupfish's proliferation.

In spring 2025, the population suddenly declined to only 20 individuals due to two earthquakes (December 2024 and February 2025), prompting the introduction, for the first time, of 19 captive-bred fish resulting in the reported spring count of 38 fish. Substantial swings in population size are considered not untypical for species in the genus, and the National Park service reported in April that the breeding season was "showing encouraging results," with the species being "on the road to recovery."

After a spring 2026 count, biologists from the U.S. Fish and Wildlife Service reported that the population had increased to 77 individuals. Since the scientists had not taken genetic samples from the captive-bred fish introduced the previous year, it is impossible to tell how much of this population increase can be attributed to them. However, a geneticist working with the fish said they likely outcompeted the wild fish in mating and that their introduction will essentially "reduce the genetic diversity in the wild by about half," potentially affecting the species' ability to withstand future threats.

== See also ==
Many of the various surviving local Cyprinodon species and subspecies (pupfish), including the Devils Hole pupfish, are on the IUCN Red List of threatened species:

- Ash Meadows pupfish, Cyprinodon nevadensis mionectes
- Amargosa pupfish, Cyprinodon nevadensis amargosae
- Death Valley pupfish, Salt Creek pupfish Cyprinodon salinus salinus
- Cottonball Marsh pupfish, Cyprinodon salinus milleri
- Shoshone pupfish, Cyprinodon nevadensis shoshone
- Saratoga Springs pupfish, Cyprinodon nevadensis nevadensis
- Tecopa pupfish, Cyprinodon nevadensis calidae (extinct)
- Desert pupfish, Cyprinodon macularius
- Owens pupfish, Cyprinodon radiosus
