= Joseph H. Wales =

American ichthyologist

Joseph Howe Wales (27 November 1907 – 21 August 2002) was an American ichthyologist.

== Career ==
Joseph Howe Wales was born on 27 November 1907 in Iowa City, Iowa. At the age of 10 he moved with his parents Robert W. and Laverne Sorter Wales to Pasadena, California. In 1926, before his graduation at high school he contributed to the journal Condor where he published articles about the band-tailed pigeon and gulls.

Together with George S. Myers he collected three specimens of the now extinct Ash Meadows killifish in 1930. In the same year he graduated to Bachelor of Arts and in 1932 to Master of Arts at the Stanford University. In 1934 he received his Ph.D. After a diving trip to Devils Hole he wrote the scientific description to the previously unrecognized Devil's Hole pupfish. In 1935, he married Elizabeth Bangle, a mate from Stanford. He later worked as biological surveyor at the Bureau of Fish Conservation, California Division of Fish and Game in San Francisco, California, as District fisheries biologist in Mount Shasta, for the California Trout Investigation and at the California fish hatcheries. From 1959 to 1979 he served as Associate Professor of Food Science and Technology and pathologist at the Oregon State University, where he analyzed liver cancer in rainbow trouts.

As a pastime Wales and his wife bred Thoroughbred horses at their residence at Mount Shasta. Wales was a member of the American Association for the Advancement of Science and the American Fisheries Society.

He died in Corvallis, Oregon on 21 August 2002.

== Selected works ==
- 1932: Life History of the Blue Rockfish Sebastodes mystinus
- 1959: Trout of California
- 1972: Essential Fatty Acids in the Diet of Rainbow Trout (Salmo gairdneri): Physiological Symptoms of EFA Deficiency (w/ J D Castell, R O Sinnhuber, and D J Lee)
- 1983: Microscopic Anatomy of Salmonids (with William T. Yasutake)
- Sinnhuber, RO; Hendricks JD; Wales JH; Putnam GB (1978-09-29). "Neoplasms in rainbow trout, a sensitive animal model for environmental carcinogenesis". Ann N Y Acad Sci. 298: 389–408. doi:10.1111/j.1749-6632.1977.tb19280.x. PMID 280189. S2CID 13228556.
- Warren, CE; JH Wales; GE Davis; P Doudoroff (1964). "Trout production in an experimental stream enriched with sucrose". Journal of Wildlife Management. 28 (4): 617–660. doi:10.2307/3798780. JSTOR 3798780.
- Wales, JH (1955). "Three protozoan diseases of trout in California". California Fish and Game.

== Taxon described by him ==
- See Category:Taxa named by Joseph Howe Wales
