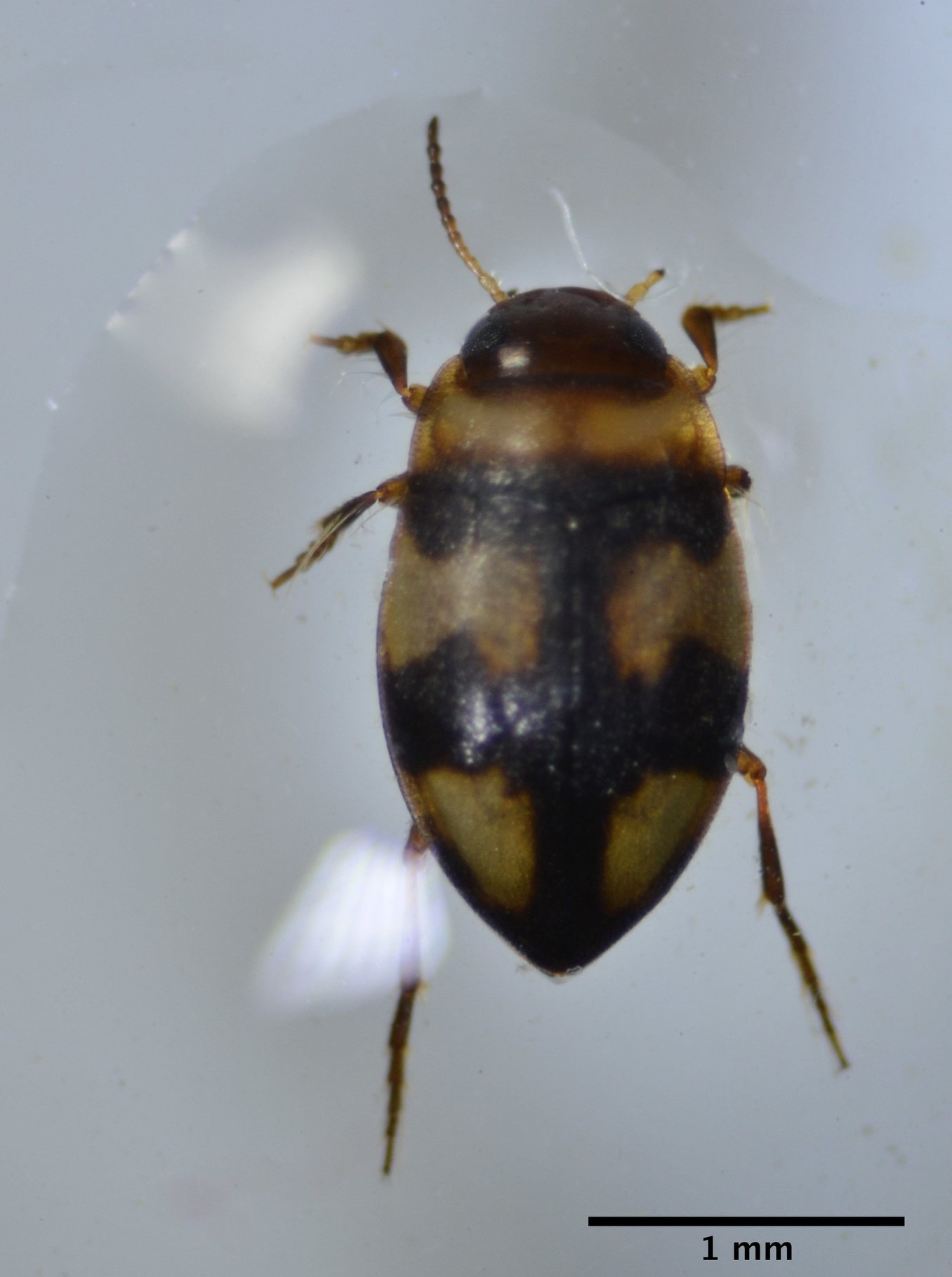
- Neoclypeodytes leachi

Scientific classification
- Kingdom: Animalia
- Phylum: Arthropoda
- Clade: Pancrustacea
- Class: Insecta
- Order: Coleoptera
- Suborder: Adephaga
- Family: Dytiscidae
- Tribe: Bidessini
- Genus: Neoclypeodytes; Young, 1967

= Neoclypeodytes =

Genus of beetles

Neoclypeodytes is a genus of beetles in the family Dytiscidae found in North and Central America, containing the following species:

- Neoclypeodytes amybethae K.B.Miller, 2001
- Neoclypeodytes anasinus K.B.Miller, 2001
- Neoclypeodytes astrapus K.B.Miller, 2001
- Neoclypeodytes balkei Scheers & Hajek, 2020
- Neoclypeodytes challeti K.B.Miller, 2001
- Neoclypeodytes cinctellus (LeConte, 1852)
- Neoclypeodytes curtulus (Sharp, 1887)
- Neoclypeodytes discedens (Sharp, 1882)
- Neoclypeodytes discretus (Sharp, 1882)
- Neoclypeodytes edithae K.B.Miller, 2001
- Neoclypeodytes fortunensis Scheers & Hajek, 2020
- Neoclypeodytes fryii (Clark, 1862)
- Neoclypeodytes haroldi K.B.Miller, 2001
- Neoclypeodytes latifrons (Sharp, 1882)
- Neoclypeodytes leachi (Leech, 1948)
- Neoclypeodytes luctuosus (Guignot, 1949)
- Neoclypeodytes lynceus (Sharp, 1882)
- Neoclypeodytes megalus K.B.Miller, 2001
- Neoclypeodytes moroni Arce-Pérez & Novelo-Gutiérrez, 2015
- Neoclypeodytes nanus K.B.Miller, 2001
- Neoclypeodytes obesus (Sharp, 1882)
- Neoclypeodytes ornatellus (Fall, 1917)
- Neoclypeodytes pictodes (Sharp, 1882)
- Neoclypeodytes plicipennis (Crotch, 1873)
- Neoclypeodytes quadrinotatus (Sharp, 1882)
- Neoclypeodytes quadripustulatus (Fall, 1917)
- Neoclypeodytes roughleyi K.B.Miller, 2001
- Neoclypeodytes similis K.B.Miller, 2001
- Neoclypeodytes tumulus K.B.Miller, 2001
