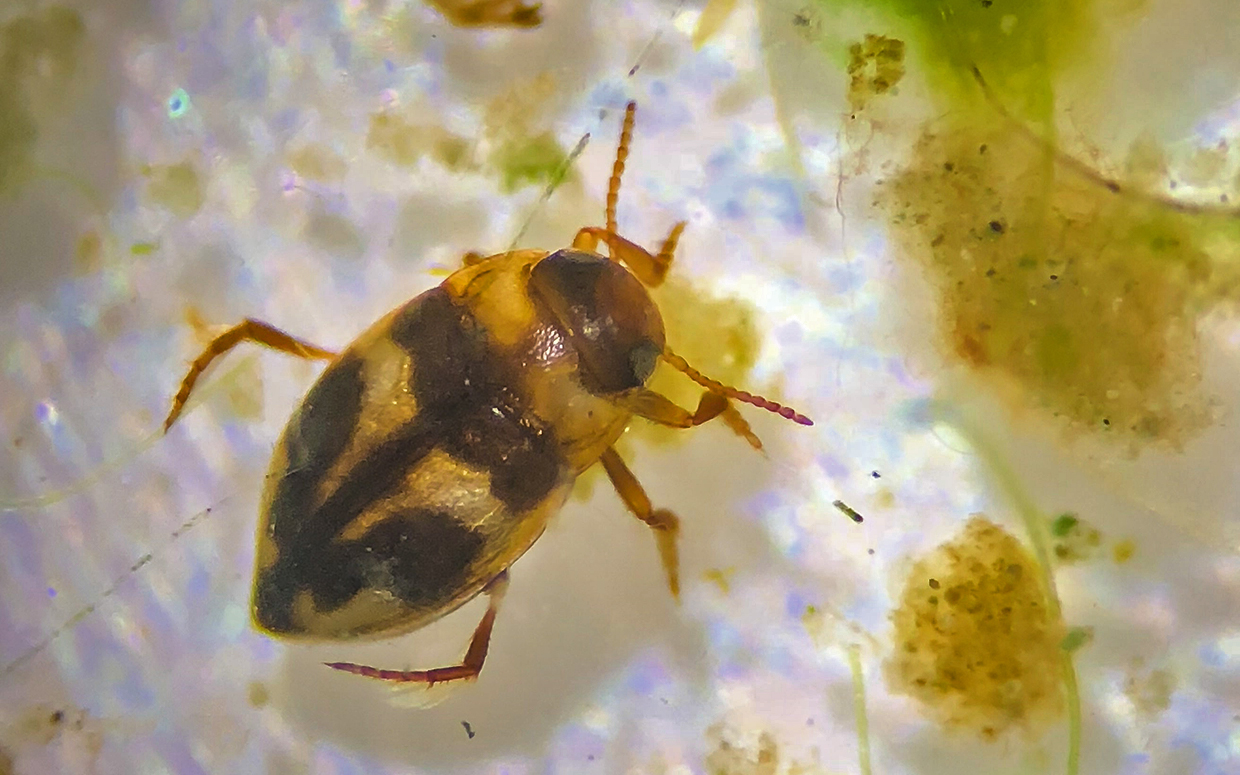

Scientific classification
- Domain: Eukaryota
- Kingdom: Animalia
- Phylum: Arthropoda
- Class: Insecta
- Order: Coleoptera
- Suborder: Adephaga
- Family: Dytiscidae
- Genus: Neoclypeodytes
- Species: N. cinctellus

Binomial name
- Neoclypeodytes cinctellus (LeConte, 1852)

= Neoclypeodytes cinctellus =

Species of beetle

Neoclypeodytes cinctellus is a species of predaceous diving beetle in the family Dytiscidae. It is found in North America and the Neotropics. It is a predator of the critically endangered Devils Hole pupfish and has distinctive brown patterning on its head and abdomen.
