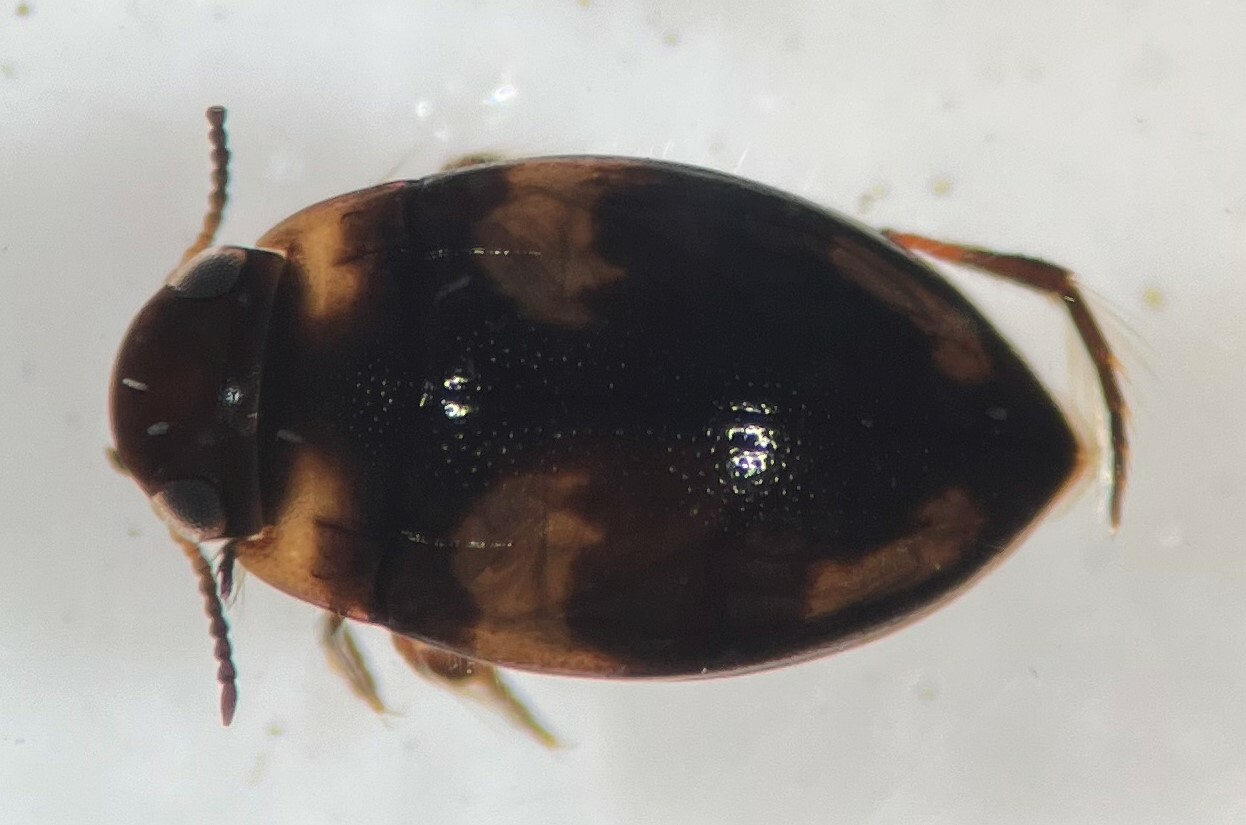

Scientific classification
- Kingdom: Animalia
- Phylum: Arthropoda
- Clade: Pancrustacea
- Class: Insecta
- Order: Coleoptera
- Suborder: Adephaga
- Family: Dytiscidae
- Genus: Neoclypeodytes
- Species: N. fryii

Binomial name
- Neoclypeodytes fryii (Clark, 1862)

Synonyms
- Bidessus decoratus Fall, 1917; Neoclypeodytes decoratus (Fall, 1917)

= Neoclypeodytes fryii =

Species of beetle

Neoclypeodytes fryii is a species of predaceous diving beetle in the family Dytiscidae. It is found in North America and the Neotropics.
