= Neoclypeodytes pictodes =

Scientific classification
- Kingdom: Animalia
- Phylum: Arthropoda
- Class: Insecta
- Order: Coleoptera
- Suborder: Adephaga
- Family: Dytiscidae
- Genus: Neoclypeodytes
- Species: N. pictodes

Binomial name
- Neoclypeodytes pictodes (Sharp, 1882)

Synonyms
- Bidessus pictodes Sharp, 1882

Species of beetle

Neoclypeodytes pictodes is a species of predaceous diving beetle in the family Dytiscidae. It is found in North America.
