= Cleaning and disinfection of personal diving equipment =

Prevention of infection by shared or contaminated equipment

Diving equipment may be exposed to contamination in use and when this happens it must be decontaminated. This is a particular issue for hazmat diving, but incidental contamination can occur in other environments. Personal diving equipment shared by more than one user requires disinfection before use. Shared use is common for expensive commercial diving equipment, and for rental recreational equipment, and some items such as demand valves, masks, helmets and snorkels which are worn over the face or held in the mouth are possible vectors for infection by a variety of pathogens. Diving suits are also likely to be contaminated, but less likely to transmit infection directly.

The maintenance of personal diving equipment includes cleaning and inspection after use, repair or servicing when necessary or scheduled, and appropriate storage. A large part of this is washing off salt water to prevent it from drying on the equipment and leaving corrosive brine or abrasive salt deposits, which can cause accelerated deterioration of some materials and jamming of moving parts. The ultraviolet component of sunlight can also damage non-metallic components and equipment, and ozone produced by electrical equipment is known to adversely affect some materials, such as the latex seals on dry suits. Storage at high temperatures can also reduce the useful life of some materials. Most diving equipment will last better if stored in a cool, dry place out of direct sunlight.

When disinfecting diving equipment it is necessary to consider the effectiveness of the disinfectant on the expected or targeted pathogens, and the possible adverse effects on the equipment. Some highly effective methods for disinfection can damage the equipment, or cause accelerated degradation of components due to incompatibility with materials. Ultraviolet light - including sunshine, ozone and high temperatures are among these. Chlorinated water in swimming pools will also degrade some materials, but rinsing in fresh water after use will minimise the effect.

Effective cleaning and sanitisation procedures are expected of service providers renting diving equipment to the public, and by commercial diving contractors in terms of occupational health and safety legislation, and codes of practice.

== Contamination sources ==
Diving equipment may be contaminated by several types of materials from several classes of source.

Types of contamination include:

- Biological agents, including pathogens, irritants, and toxic organisms or parts thereof.
- Chemical materials, which may be hazardous to the user, or harmful to the equipment.
- Radioactive materials
- Mechanical contaminants, such as sand, which can danage or degrade performance of equipment, or cause discomfort or injury to the user.

Routes of contamination include:

- The diving environment, particularly in Hazmat diving, in which cases the likely contaminants will be known and plans will be in place to effectively deal with them, but sometimes also unexpected contaminants, which may be more difficult to manage.
- The user may contaminate some items of equipment during normal use, or by accident.
- During handling and storage, usually due to unexpected circumstances.

== Pathogens likely to be found on personal diving equipment ==
- Pathogens from a contaminated environment.
- Pathogens transmitted in saliva, sputum, nasal mucus and vomit are possible contaminants of masks, demand valves, snorkels, helmets and buoyancy compensator inflation heads and interiors. These potentially include a wide range of viruses and bacteria, including rhinoviruses and coronaviruses.
- Pathogens transmitted by contact with skin infections are possible contaminants of diving suits and diving suit accessories.
- Pathogens found in bodily discharges including urine and feces are possible contaminants of diving suits.

Pathogens which are known to contaminate bodies of water include:

- Bacteria, such as:
  - Escherichia coli – Strains of E. coli that can cause disease
  - Salmonella spp. – Genus of bacteria
  - Klebsiella pneumoniae – Species of bacterium
  - Aeromonas hydrophila – Species of heterotrophic, Gram-negative, bacterium
  - Vibrio vulnificus – Species of pathogenic bacterium found in water
- Protozoans, such as:
  - Entamoeba histolytica – Anaerobic parasitic protist
  - Giardia duodenalis – Parasitic microorganism that causes giardiasis
  - Naegleria fowleri – Species of protozoa
  - Acanthamoeba spp. – Genus of protozoans
  - Pfiesteria piscicida – Toxic dinoflagellate species
- Viruses

Pathogens which may be transmitted between sequential users of diving equipment:

- Bacteria:
- Viruses:
  - SARS-CoV-2 – Virus that causes COVID-19

== General cleaning ==
Cleaning to remove salt water, sand, mud, and other relatively harmless environmental contaminants is intended to reduce degradation of the equipment and improve comfort during the next use. In most cases soaking or rinsing in fresh water is sufficient, but detergents and occasionally scrubbing before rinsing can speed up the process. This basic cleaning may remove some pathogens and chemical contaminants, but it is not reliable for this purpose. This level of cleaning has traditionally been considered sufficient for equipment only used by one person in environments considered to be free of chemical and microbial health hazards.

=== Cleaning after use ===
Cleaning after use is generally intended to remove contaminants which may degrade the equipment, and which may be harmful to persons coming into normal handling contact with the equipment. It may be combined with disinfection suitable to prepare the equipment for use by another person, but the two aspects are not necessarily managed identically or together.

=== Disinfection before use ===
Disinfection of equipment before use, or between users, is intended to remove biological contamination that would affect the next diver to use it. This is generally an issue when the equipment is not contaminated by substances or microorganisms which are harmful to the equipment, but could infect and cause illness in the next user, or in the special case of potable water diving, could contaminate the drinking water supply. If there is not sufficient time and facilities to adequately disinfect between users, equipment which could infect the user should not be shared.

== Targeted disinfection ==
During periods of increased risk relating to a specific pathogen during an epidemic, or after diving in an area known as a high risk for a specific pathogen, disinfection procedures will target that pathogen.

During an epidemic, the first line of defence is for symptomatic people and people who have tested positive for the infection to refrain from diving, however in the early stages of some diseases it will not be apparent that the person is infectious, so it is prudent to take reasonably practicable preventative measures when the risk is assessed as significant.

=== Disinfection to prevent SARS-CoV-2 infection ===
The severe acute respiratory syndrome coronavirus 2 (SARS-CoV-2), which causes the COVID-19 disease is considered easier to kill than the closely related SARS-CoV-1, so in the absence of specific test results for SARS-CoV-2, methods for disinfection of SARS-CoV-1 are assumed to be effective.

According to the World Health Organization, SARS-CoV-1 loses infectivity after 15 minutes at 56 °C (133 °F), Another study showed that SARS-CoV-1 remains stable between 4 °C (39 °F) and 37 °C (99 °F), and loses infectivity after 30 minutes at 56 °C (133 °F). (Duan et al 2003 in DANSA 2020)

Divers Alert Network has estimated that a breathing air compressor in a 27 °C (81 °F) environment, would have an inter-stage temperature inside the cylinder of about 107 °C (225 °F). The calculation does not account for anything outside of nominal conditions, but it indicates the instantaneous temperature at the moment of peak pressure. In reality the compressed air is cooled between stages, and the compressor itself is fairly hot, so direct measurement would be relatively simple, but this does not take into account time of exposure to temperature.

The actual gas temperature at the outlet from each stage was reported to be around 66 °C (151 °F) This is considered to be hot enough to kill SARS-CoV-2, so it is considered unlikely that the virus would survive passing through a compressor. Infected droplets exhaled by a person can be as small as 0.5 micron, so the compressor particle filter systems would not reliably remove them.

There are many disinfectants that are assumed to be effective on SARS-CoV-2 based on their effectiveness on similar viruses which are considered more resistant to deactivation. The United States Environmental Protection Agency (EPA) publish a list of disinfectant products which meet the EPA's criteria for use against SARS-CoV-2 in "List N: Disinfectants for Use Against SARS-CoV-2" in the absence of specific testing on SARS-CoV-2.

Divers Alert Network have recommended following Centers for Disease Control (CDC) advice on using a solution of household bleach diluted 4:100 in water with a contact time of 1 minute followed by a thorough rinse in water to remove residual disinfectant. As of April 24 2020, Steramine, a quaternary ammonium compound popular for disinfecting diving equipment, did not appear on the EPA's "List N" and is therefore not endorsed for disinfecting SARS-CoV-2. However, many other products using quaternary ammonium compounds are on List N. Quaternary ammonium-containing products are harmful to the environment and suitable precautions should be applied to their use and disposal.

Sodium hypochlorite bleach is a strong oxidant which has been tested in different concentrations, and is proven to be effective against viruses by damaging the viral genome. The World Health Organization (WHO) recommend a 1:100 dilution of 5% sodium hypochlorite bleach solution for general disinfection, which yields 0.05% or 50 ppm of the active ingredient which requires a soaking time of 30 minutes or at least 10 minutes wet time if sprayed onto a nonporous surface. Specific studies on SARS-CoV-2 found that a sodium hypochlorite bleach concentration of 0.1% (1,000 ppm) was necessary to adequately reduce infectivity when sprayed onto a non-porous surface, and that it would inactivate the virus within 1 minute. A study on SARS-CoV-1 showed that a 1:100 dilution (0.05%) inactivated the virus after an immersion of 5 minutes. Bleach-based disinfectants may cause accelerated degradation of some materials used in breathing apparatus components.

=== Pathogens associated with specific environments ===
Commercial diving operations are often required for maintenance and repair work in water known to have high counts of E. coli and other pathogens. Diving equipment used in these environments should preferably isolate the diver completely from the environment, and the diver and equipment should be decontaminated by competent persons after leaving the water and before removing the encapsulating equipment from the diver.

Caves are isolated ecosystems known contain unique, protected, or endangered species and are susceptible to cross-contamination from foreign species of plants, animals, and micro-organisms from other bodies of water. For example, the National Park Service requires certification of heat and chemical disinfection followed by a prolonged 30-day drying before entering Devils Hole.

== Specific equipment ==
Apeks, a manufacturer of scuba regulators and other diving equipment, specifically warn against the use of bleach based disinfectants or disinfectants known to be corrosive, on scuba regulators, as they can cause accelerated degradation of the equipment. They recommend different procedures based on risk.

- Low risk, where the equipment is used by one person and there is no reason to assume environmental contamination: The regulator may be washed after use in warm fresh water with household dish-washing detergent, rinsed with fresh water, purged, drained, and dried before storage.
- Moderate risk, where the equipment is used by more than one person: The regulator may be washed to remove deposits of organic matter, rinsed in fresh water, and drained, then immersed in a suitable strength solution of bleach-free disinfectant certified as effective against the expected pathogens, for a suitable period – 20 minutes is suggested – followed by a final fresh water rinse, purge, drain and drying before storage or re-use.
- Higher risk, where the equipment is used by more than one person: A higher concentration of disinfectant can be used, following the same procedures.

== See also ==
- Decontamination – Process of removing or neutralising harmful substances
- Disinfectant – Antimicrobial agent that inactivates or destroys microbes
- Epidemiology – Study of health and disease within a population
- Infection – Invasion of an organism's body by pathogenic agents
- Occupational health – Field concerning the health of people at work
- Occupational hygiene – Management of workplace health hazards
- Sterilization (microbiology) – Process that eliminates all biological agents on an object or in a volume
