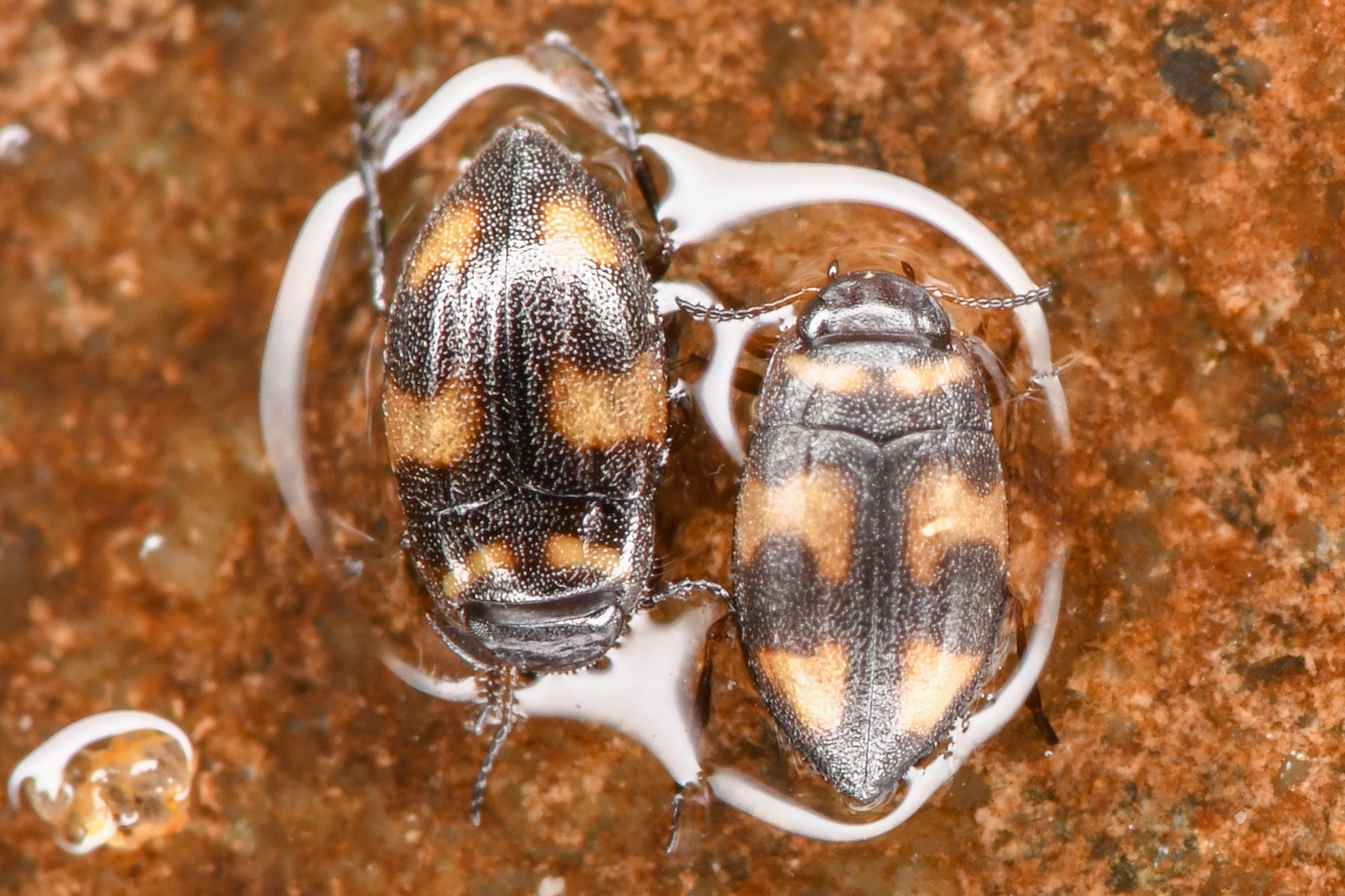

Scientific classification
- Kingdom: Animalia
- Phylum: Arthropoda
- Clade: Pancrustacea
- Class: Insecta
- Order: Coleoptera
- Suborder: Adephaga
- Family: Dytiscidae
- Genus: Neoclypeodytes
- Species: N. plicipennis

Binomial name
- Neoclypeodytes plicipennis (Crotch, 1873)

= Neoclypeodytes plicipennis =

Species of beetle

Neoclypeodytes plicipennis is a species of predaceous diving beetle in the family Dytiscidae. It is found in North America.
