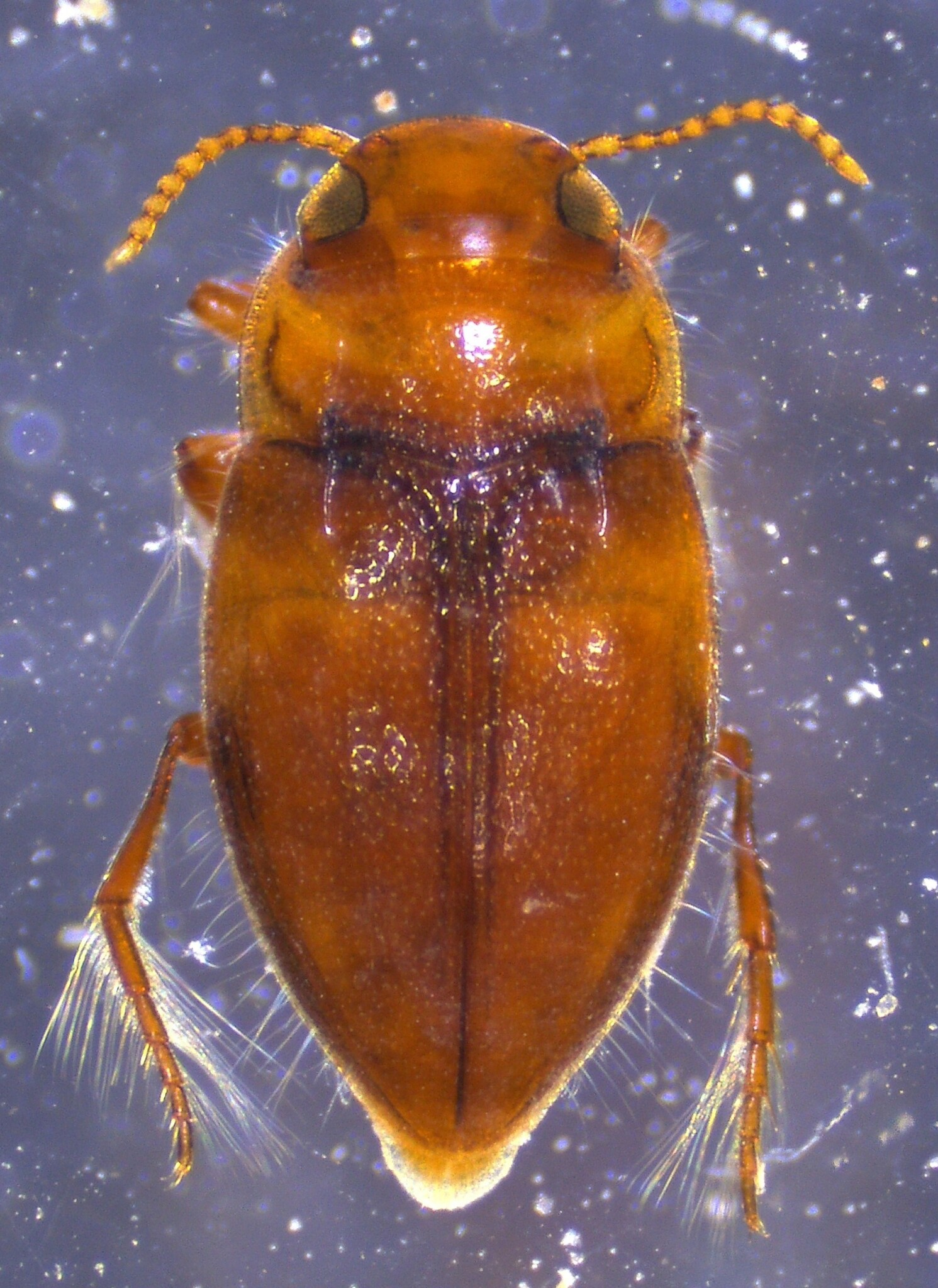

Scientific classification
- Kingdom: Animalia
- Phylum: Arthropoda
- Clade: Pancrustacea
- Class: Insecta
- Order: Coleoptera
- Suborder: Adephaga
- Family: Dytiscidae
- Genus: Neoclypeodytes
- Species: N. discretus

Binomial name
- Neoclypeodytes discretus (Sharp, 1882)

Synonyms
- Bidessus discretus Sharp, 1882

= Neoclypeodytes discretus =

Species of beetle

Neoclypeodytes discretus is a species of predaceous diving beetle in the family Dytiscidae. It is found in North America.
