= Devils Hole =

Spring in Nye County, Nevada, United States

Coordinates: 36°25′31″N 116°17′29″W

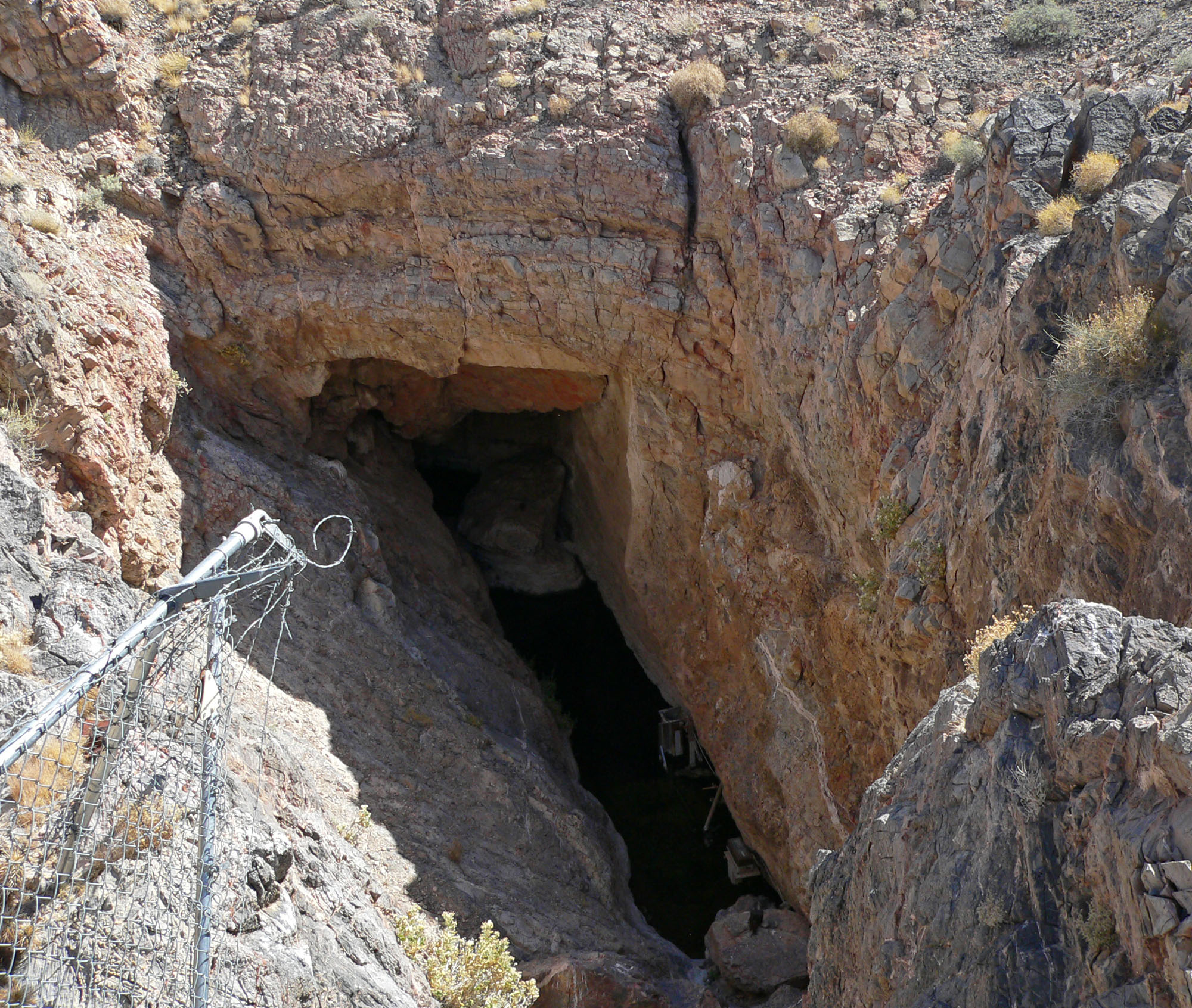
Looking into Devils Hole; the dark area is the surface of the water.

Devils Hole is a geologic formation located in a detached unit of Death Valley National Park and surrounded by the Ash Meadows National Wildlife Refuge, in Nye County, Nevada, in the Southwestern United States.

Devils Hole is habitat for the only naturally occurring population of the endangered Devils Hole pupfish (Cyprinodon diabolis). The 40 acres (16 ha) unit is part of the Ash Meadows complex, an area of desert uplands and spring-fed oases that was designated as a National Wildlife Refuge in 1984. In 1952 President Harry Truman added Devils Hole to what was then Death Valley National Monument.

== Description ==
Devils Hole is a geothermal pool within a limestone cavern in the Amargosa Desert in the Amargosa Valley of Nevada, east over the Amargosa Range and Funeral Mountains from Death Valley. It is at an elevation of 730 m (2,400 ft) above sea level and the water is a constant temperature of 33 °C (91 °F). The surface area of Devils Hole is about 22 m long by 3.5 m wide (72 ft long by 11.5 ft wide). Approximately 0.3 m (1.0 ft) deep on one end of Devils Hole is a small rock shelf of 3.5 by 5 m (11 by 16 ft). The dissolved oxygen of the water is 2.5–3.0 ppm up to around 22 m (72 ft) in depth, though the shallow shelf can have dissolved oxygen levels as high as 6.0–7.0 ppm in June and July.

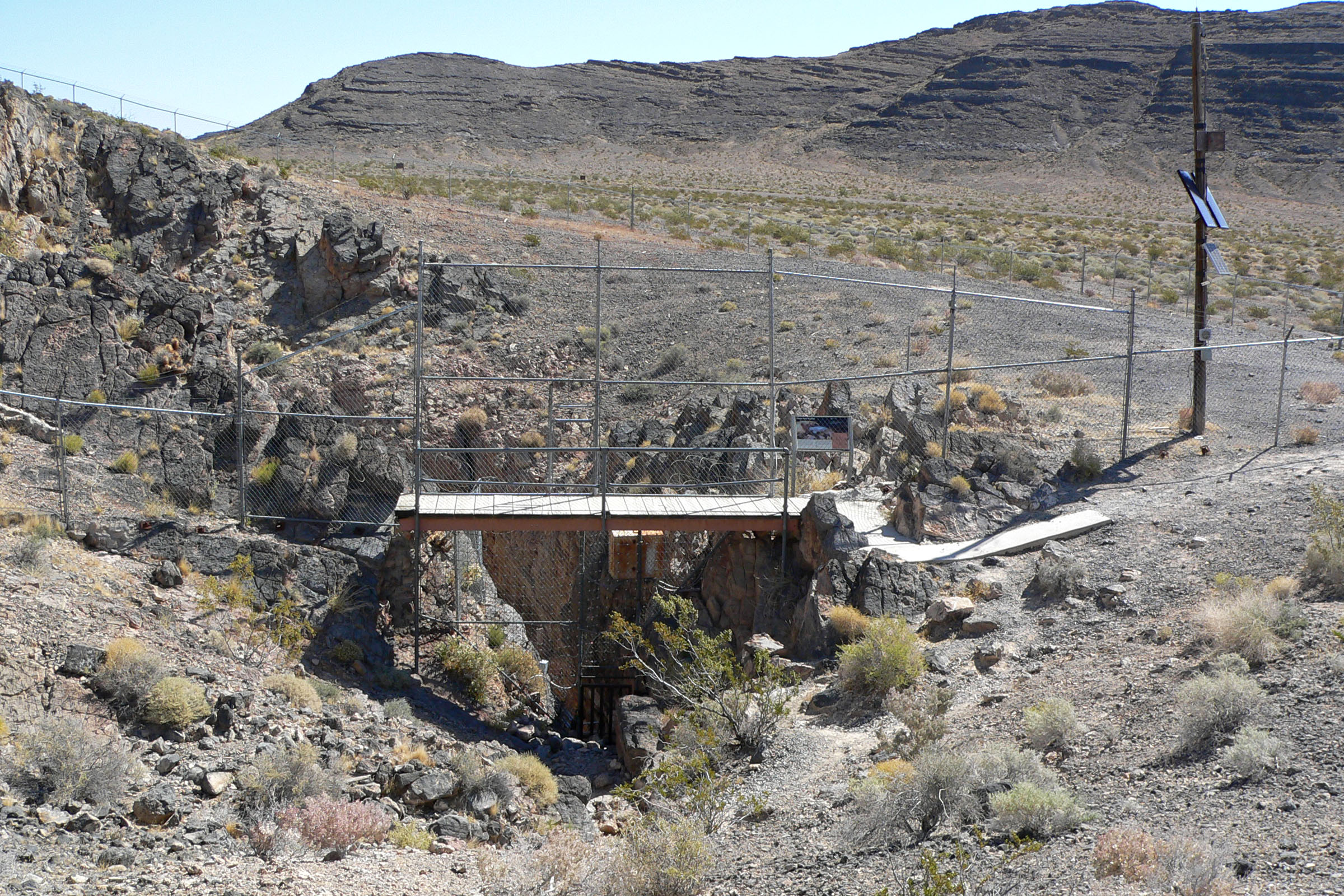
A viewing platform overlooks the hole.

Devils Hole branches into caverns at least 130 m (430 ft) deep, whose bottom has never been mapped. According to geologists, the caves were formed over 500,000 years ago. The pool has frequently experienced seiche activity due to far away earthquakes in Japan, Indonesia, Mexico, and Chile, which have been likened to extremely small scale tsunamis.

Below the surface pool, Devils Hole descends approximately 160 feet (50 m) through what is termed the "main chamber" before reaching a narrow opening referred to as the "funnel". Through this opening lies a much larger chamber of the cavern system known as Acree's Chasm. Acree's Chasm is approximately 300 feet (91 m) in length, 40 feet (12 m) in width, and has a bottom approximately 260 feet (80 m) below the surface.

Immediately after passing the funnel into Acree's Chamber, a narrow side tube can be found to a diver's left. This side tube proceeds approximately 90 feet (27 m) upward to a chamber with an air pocket, named Brown's Room. The tube leading to Brown's Room has at least 2 offshoots, the higher of which leads to a dead-end filled with a small air pocket, and the lower of which joins with additional tubes descending from Brown's Room. If the diver instead descends through Acree's Chamber, the first notable landmark is a rocky shelf termed the "lower ledge", around 100 feet (30 m) below the entrance to the chamber. The bottom of Acree's Chamber lies around 260 feet (79 m) below the surface, but is not flat. Instead, a portion of the chamber floor descends below this lower shelf; a gradual funnel leads to a hole in the bottom of the chamber featuring a strong current. The hole, later termed the ojo de agua, is 315 feet (96 m) below the surface and just large enough for a diver with equipment to fit through.

On June 20, 1965, Paul Giancontieri, a teenager who had jumped the fence with friends to go SCUBA diving in the hole, did not come back up. His brother-in-law David Rose went down to find him but did not resurface either. An effort by five divers to find their bodies three days later was unsuccessful.

On June 20, 1965, during the second dive of a rescue and then body recovery mission, Jim Houtz with his dive partner dropped a weighted depth line to a depth of 932 feet (284 m) from the start of this opening, without hitting the bottom of the chamber below. Due to the strong current, the small size of the entrance, and the unknown depth of the cavern below, which Houtz termed the "Infinity Room", Jim and his partner chose not to explore this Infinity Room. This mission did, however, confirm that the Infinity Room of Devil's Hole, and the cavern system itself, has a depth of at least 1,247 feet (380 m) from the surface.

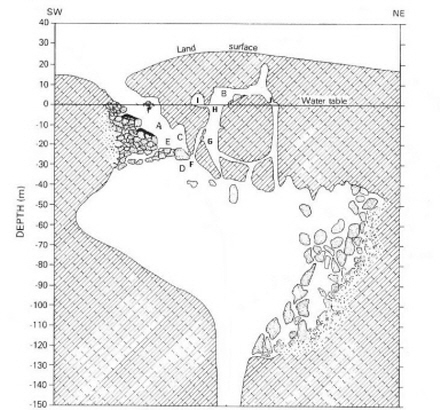
Updated diagram of Devils Hole (2005)

A subsequent USGS exploration into Devils Hole in 1991 by Alan Riggs, Paul DeLoach, and Sheck Exley entered what they found out to be a narrow tube rather than an "Infinity Room" at 315 feet (96 m), descending to a depth of 436 feet (133 m). The team reported being able to see down to a depth of some 500 feet (150 m), without visualizing the bottom of the cavern.

On March 20, 2012, a 7.4-magnitude earthquake in Oaxaca, Mexico, some 2,000 miles (3,200 km) away and centered roughly 12 miles (19 km) below the surface, caused an undulating 4 feet (1.2 m) rise and fall of the cavern waters, as appreciated by researchers working at Devils Hole at the time. This provided further evidence that the Devils Hole cave system was connected not only to the Death Valley Regional Groundwater Flow System, but possibly to even further-reaching underground water systems. The 1991 USGS dive team described Devils Hole as a "skylight" into the water table.

A team of paleoclimatologists from the University of Innsbruck have been collecting and dating calcite mineral deposits here since 2010. In March 2017, underwater cinematographer Jonathan Bird received permission to assist scientists in a four-day expedition to take water and calcite core samples. The IMAX footage was included in the 2020 film Ancient Caves and extra footage was used to create the video documentary Exploring Devils Hole.

There had been similar studies in Devils Hole, but these are no longer permitted due to the endangered status of the Devils Hole pupfish. Cleaning and disinfection of diving equipment, climbing gear, cameras, etc. using hot water and Steramine followed by at least 30 days of air-drying is required by the National Park Service to prevent contamination of the underwater ecosystem.

On September 19, 2022, a seiche reaching 4 feet (1.2 metres) occurred at Devils Hole after a 7.6-magnitude earthquake hit western Mexico, about 1,500 miles (2,400 kilometres) away. Seiches were also observed in the cave after powerful earthquakes in 2012, 2018, 2019, and 2024.

== Devils Hole Cave ==
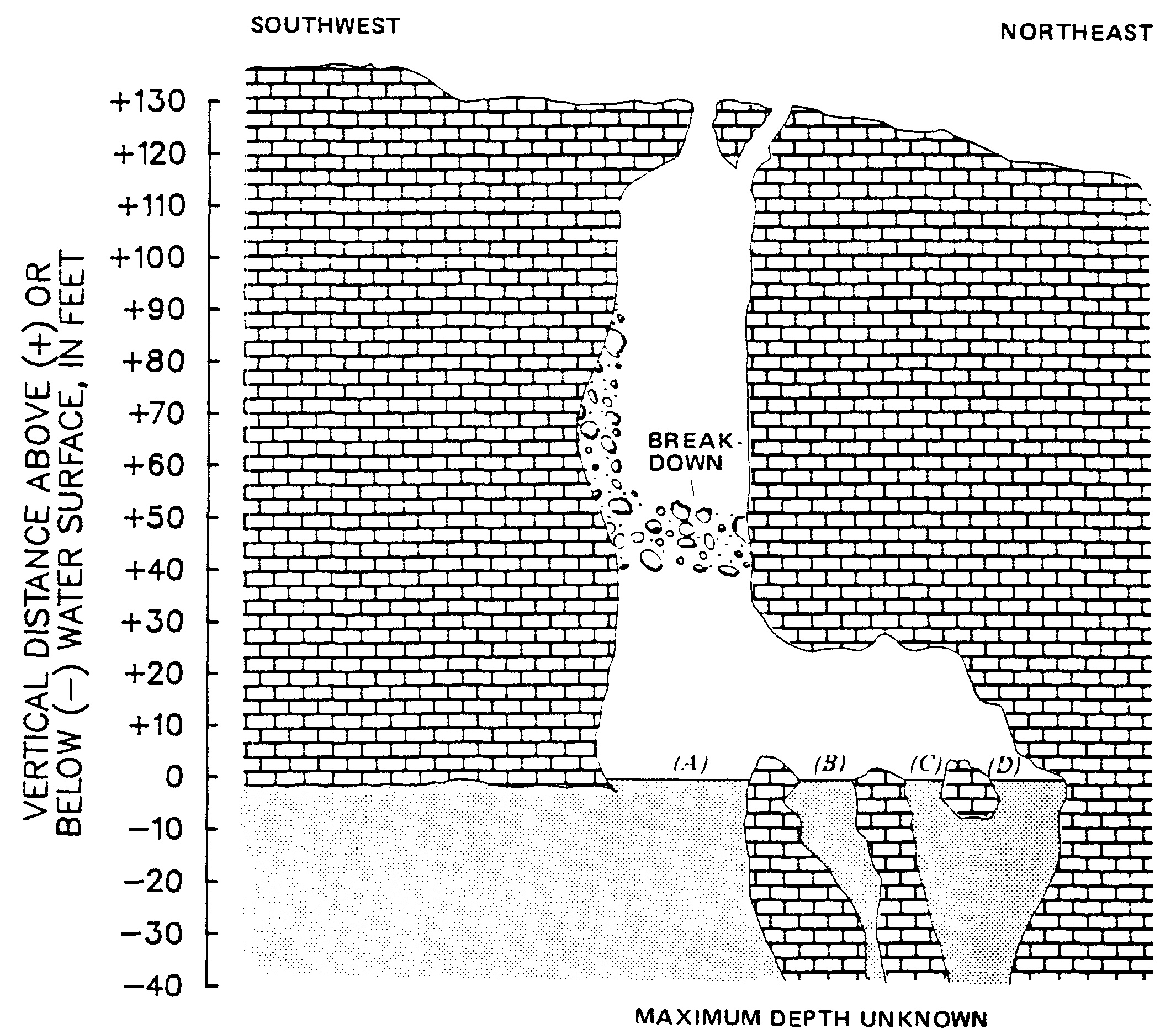
Diagram of Devils Hole Cave (1988)

Located 650 feet (200 m) north of Devils Hole is a separate cave system called Devils Hole Cave (#2). It was first explored underwater to a depth of 70 feet (21 m) by divers from the Southwestern Speleological Society in February 1961. It had been described as being shaped like a boot with fallen rock restriction at the 50-foot (15 m) level leading to a narrow pool of 93 °F (34 °C) water. Since no sunlight reaches the water, algae cannot grow and no fish species are found.

On the surface, the cave openings are connected to Devils Hole by an access road and covered with a locked metal grate. Below ground, a passable deepwater connection to Devils Hole has been theorized but remains undiscovered.

== Pupfish ==
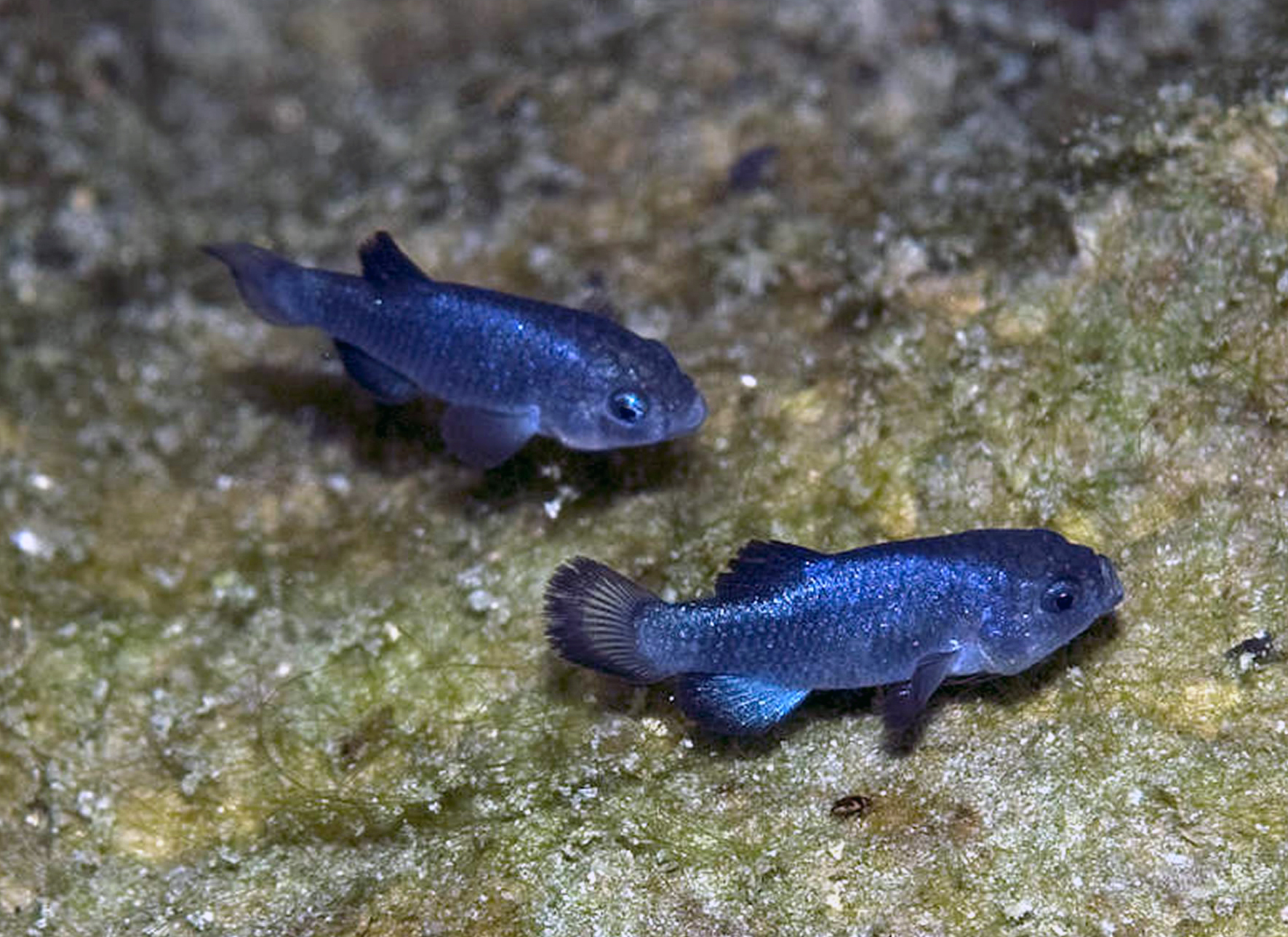
Devils Hole pupfish, Cyprinodon diabolis, from Death Valley National Park

Devils Hole is the only natural habitat of the Devils Hole pupfish, which survives despite the hot, oxygen-poor water. Devils Hole "may be the smallest habitat in the world containing the entire population of a vertebrate species". The pupfish are considered critically endangered by the IUCN. The pupfish has been described as the world's rarest fish, with a population of 263 as of 2022. Genetic information indicates that the pupfish species is as old as the Hole itself, which opened to the surface about 60,000 years ago.

The pupfish have been protected since being declared an endangered species in 1967. Conflicts of the ownership and use of the groundwater around Devils Hole caused litigation in the 1980s. The litigation triggered further protections of the pupfish. Since the late 1990s, the pupfish population has substantially decreased. The reasons for the decrease are unknown, but is possibly due to a microscopic non-indigenous diving beetle that is consuming pupfish eggs.
