= Willow Beach National Fish Hatchery =

Fish hatchery in Arizona

Coordinates: 35°52′34″N 114°39′58″W

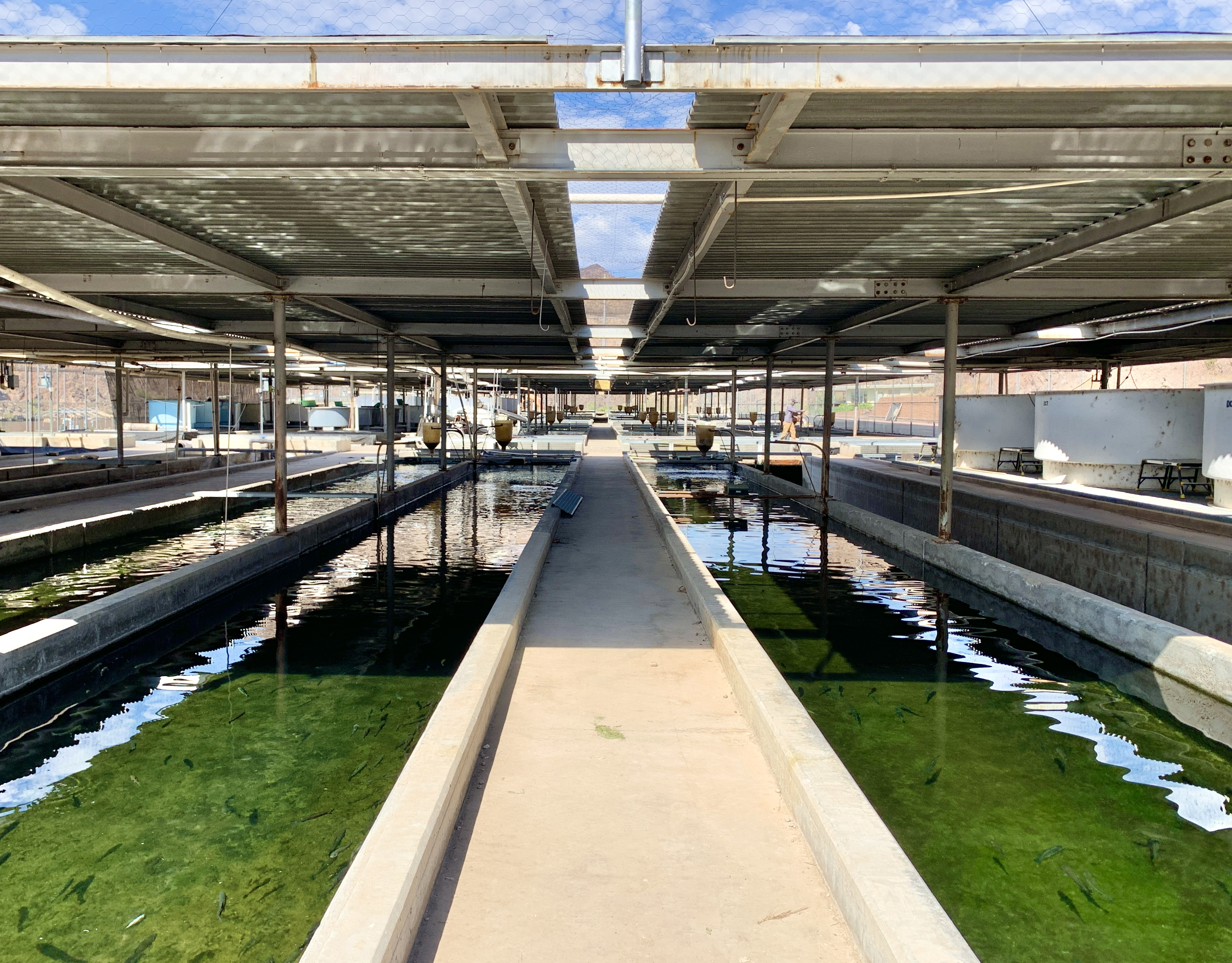
Willow Beach National Fish Hatchery

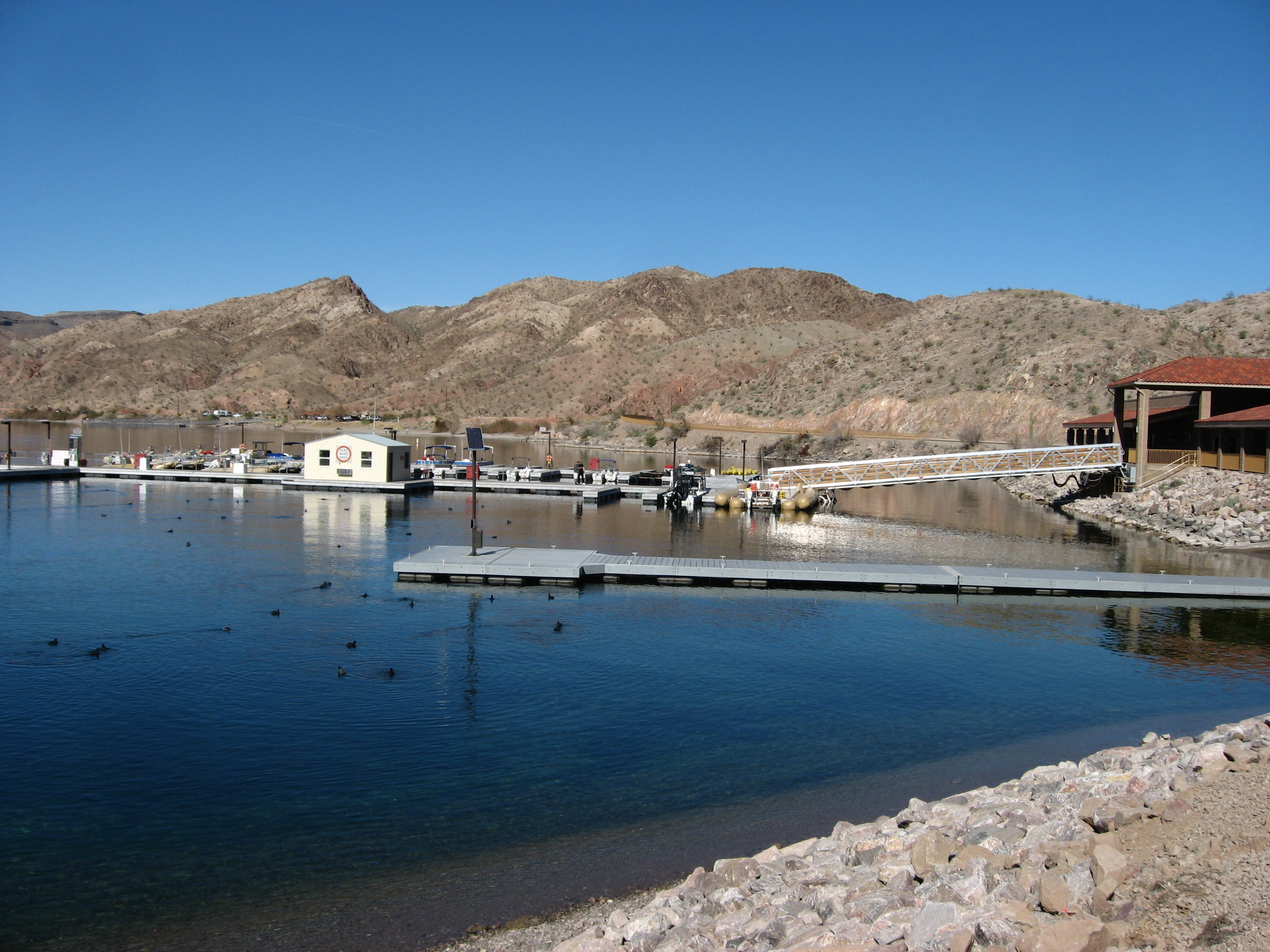
Willow Beach

The Willow Beach National Fish Hatchery is administered by the U.S. Fish and Wildlife Service, located approximately 45 miles (72.4 km) South East of Las Vegas, Nevada, in Mohave County, Arizona on the Arizona side of the Colorado River twelve miles (~19 km) south of the Hoover Dam.

== History ==
The Willow Beach Hatchery was constructed in 1959 to take advantage of the cold water flowing from Hoover Dam to raise rainbow trout. The hatchery stocked Rainbow trout at Willow Beach, below Davis Dam and in waters on tribal lands along the Colorado river, as many as 175,000 per year.

In 2013 vegetation clogged cold water intake pipes that brought water from the Colorado River causing the loss of nearly 61,000 trout in August and November.
