= 2003 Colima earthquake =

Earthquake in southwestern Mexico

- Terremoto de Colima de 2003
- Location within Mexico
- UTC time: 2003-01-22 02:06:34
- ISC event: 6541364
- USGS-ANSS: ComCat
- Local date: January 21, 2003
- Local time: 20:06:34 CST UTC-5
- Duration: 20 seconds
- Magnitude: M_{w} 7.5
- Depth: 23.9 km (15 mi)
- Epicenter: 18.770°N 104.104°W
- Fault: Middle America Trench
- Type: Thrust
- Areas affected: Pacific Coast of Mexico
- Total damage: US$119 million (equivalent to $208.3 million in 2025)
- Max. intensity: MMI VIII (Severe)
- Peak acceleration: 0.045 g
- Tsunami: 1.2 m (3.9 ft)
- Aftershocks: 33+ recorded M_{wc} 5.9 on 22 January at 14:41 CST
- Casualties: 29 fatalities, 1,073 injuries

An earthquake struck the Pacific Coast of Mexico on 21 January 2003 with a moment magnitude of 7.5. It had a maximum Mercalli intensity of VIII (Severe). The epicenter was located on the Pacific coast near the Mexican state of Colima. The earthquake killed 29 people, injured 1,073 others and damaged over 43,300 homes across five states, with minor damage also occurring in Mexico City. The earthquake was felt as far away as the states of Texas and Louisiana.

== Tectonic setting ==
This shallow earthquake occurred in a seismically active zone near the coast of central Mexico. The earthquake occurred near the juncture of three tectonic plates: the North American plate to the northeast, the Rivera plate to the northwest, and the Cocos plate to the south. Both the Rivera plate and the Cocos plate are being subsumed beneath the North American plate. The slower subducting Rivera plate is moving northwest at about 2 cm per year relative to the North American plate and the faster Cocos plate is moving in a similar direction at a rate of about 4.5 cm per year.

Several significant earthquakes have occurred near the 2003 event. In 1932, a magnitude 8.4 thrust earthquake struck about 100 km to the north-northwest. On 9 October 1995, a magnitude 7.6 earthquake struck about 50 km to the northwest killed at least 49 people and left 1,000 homeless. The most deadly earthquake in the region occurred about 170 km to the south-east on 19 September 1985. This magnitude 8.0 earthquake killed at least 9,500 people, injured about 30,000, and left 100,000 people homeless.

== Earthquake ==
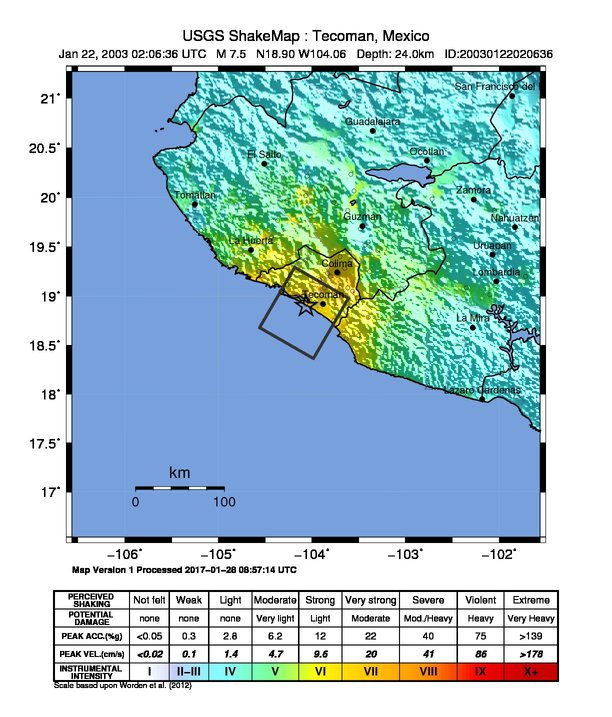
USGS ShakeMap

Striking at 02:06:34 UTC on 22 January (or 20:06 CST on 21 January), the earthquake had a magnitude of M_{w} 7.5 according to the International Seismological Centre, or M_{wb} 7.6 according to the United States Geological Survey. The offshore epicenter was located 16 km (9.9 mi) south-southwest of Cuyutlán in the state of Colima, with a hypocenter 23.9 km (15 mi) beneath the surface.

It occurred as the result of shallow thrust faulting along a section of the Middle America Trench. The earthquake rupture had an area of 145 km (90 mi) x 110 km (68 mi), with a maximum slip of 2.852 m (9.36 ft) in Armería; detectable slip was estimated in much of Colima, along with parts of Michoacán and Jalisco. The observed source time function gives a 20 second duration for the earthquake, with the greatest phase of seismic moment release occurring about 10 seconds after initiation. The earthquake ruptured a seismic gap located between the 1995 and 1973 ruptures. There were 33 aftershocks exceeding M_{w}4.0 by April 27, with the strongest event measuring M_{w} 5.9.

The earthquake had a maximum Modified Mercalli intensity of VIII (Severe) in Colima and Tecomán, and VI (Strong) in Mexico City; in the latter location, a peak ground acceleration of 0.045 g. Tremors in Mexico were felt as far away as the states of Nayarit, San Luis Potosí, Puebla and Tlaxcala. Shaking was also felt in parts of Texas, including Corpus Christi, Dallas, El Paso and Houston. The earthquake triggered a moderate tsunami, with wave heights of 1.2 m (3.9 ft) at Manzanillo, 70 cm (2.3 ft) at Zihuatanejo and 25 cm (0.82 ft) at Lazaro Cardenas. A seiche was observed on Lake Pontchartrain and sediment was stirred up in wells in Louisiana.

== Impact ==
Most of the 29 fatalities occurred in Colima. Another 1,073 others were injured and 177,530 people were affected. At least 43,300 homes were damaged, of which 2,942 collapsed, including 1,208 in Colima City, 603 in Villa de Álvarez, 307 in Coquimatlán, 214 in Comala, 203 in Tecomán, 125 in Armería, 111 in Manzanillo and 80 in Cuauhtémoc. Adobe and unreinforced masonry buildings were the most significantly damaged. Over 100 injuries were reported in Colima City, where 6,801 buildings were damaged and a furniture shop caught fire. The nearby town of Villa de Álvarez was also severely damaged, partly due to widespread ground subsidence and fissures. In Manzanillo, 2,609 homes were damaged or destroyed and soil liquefaction occurred. Landslides blocked a segment of Mexican Federal Highway 54D and the Port of Manzanillo.

The states of Jalisco and Michoacán also reported deaths and significant damage to buildings and facilities; Two people, an elderly woman and an infant, were killed by falling debris in Jalisco, while liquefaction occurred in Coahuayana, Michoacán. In Mexico City, dozens of people were hospitalized due to stress and panic, brief power outages occurred and multiple buildings suffered minor damage, including two 20-story buildings, the Sevilla Palace Hotel and a government building. A few buildings were also damaged in Guanajuato and Morelos.

== See also ==
- List of earthquakes in 2003
- List of earthquakes in Mexico
- 2022 Michoacán earthquake
