= 2022 Michoacán earthquake =

2022 earthquake in Mexico

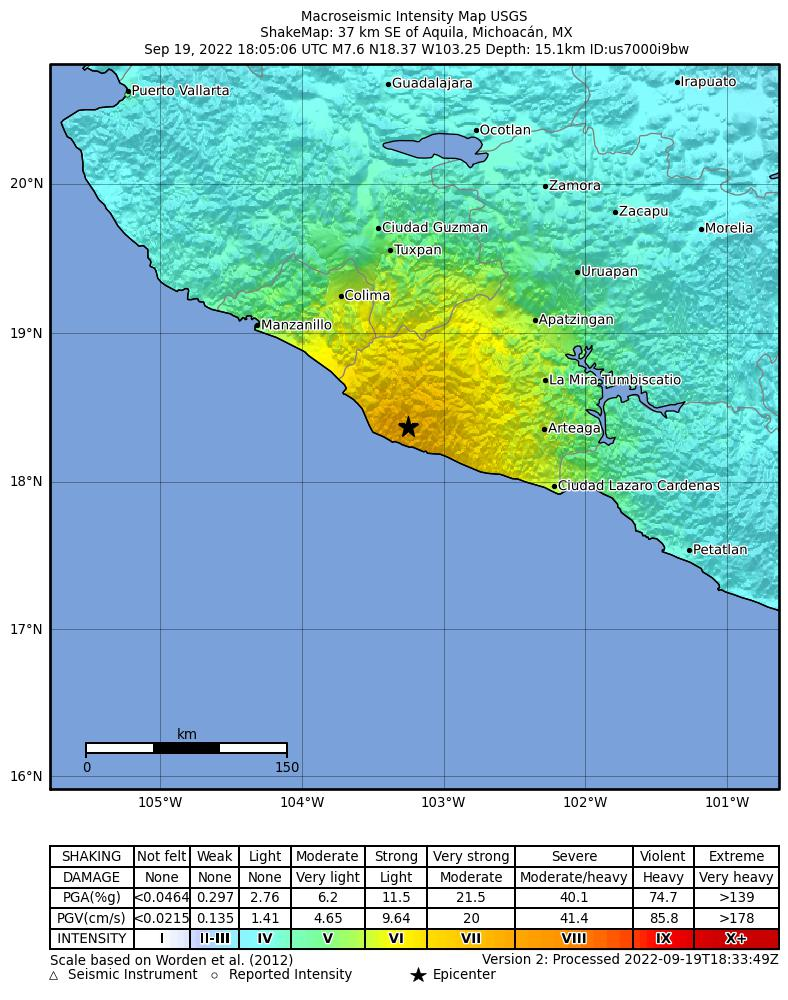
- ShakeMap created by the USGS

- Location within Mexico
- UTC time: 2022-09-19 18:05:06
- ISC event: 624820749
- USGS-ANSS: ComCat
- Local date: 19 September 2022
- Local time: 13:05:06
- Magnitude: M_{w} 7.6–7.7
- Depth: 26.9 km (16.7 mi)
- Epicenter: 18.59°N 103.43°W
- Fault: Middle America Trench
- Type: Thrust
- Max. intensity: MMI VIII (Severe)
- Peak acceleration: 0.92 g
- Tsunami: 1.75 m (5 ft 9 in)
- Aftershocks: 2,000+. Strongest is M_{w} 6.8.
- Casualties: 2 dead, 35 injured

On 19 September 2022, a moment magnitude 7.6–7.7 earthquake struck between the Mexican states of Michoacán and Colima at 13:05:06 local time. The earthquake had a depth of 26.9 km (16.7 mi), resulting in a maximum intensity of VIII (Severe) on the Modified Mercalli intensity scale. The USGS reported the epicentre was 35 km (22 mi) southwest of the town of Aquila (near the municipality of Coalcomán). Two people were killed and at least 35 others were injured across several states. A magnitude 6.8 aftershock struck on 22 September, causing three more deaths.

The earthquake coincidentally occurred on the 37th anniversary of the 1985 Mexico City earthquake, which killed around 10,000 people, and the fifth anniversary of the 2017 Puebla earthquake that struck the state of Puebla and killed 370 people. A national earthquake drill was being held shortly after midday, less than an hour before the earthquake struck.

== Tectonic setting ==
This shallow earthquake occurred in a seismically active zone near the coast of central Mexico. The earthquake occurred near the juncture of three tectonic plates, which are the North American plate to the northeast, the Rivera plate to the northwest, and the Cocos plate to the south. Both the Rivera plate and the Cocos plate are being subducted beneath the North American plate. The slower subducting Rivera plate is moving northwest at about 2 centimetres (0.79 in) per year relative to the North American plate and the faster Cocos plate is moving in a similar direction at a rate of about 4.5 centimetres (1.8 in) per year.

Several significant earthquakes have occurred near the recent event. In 1932, a magnitude 8.1 thrust earthquake struck northwest of the 2022 event. On 21 January 2003, a magnitude 7.6 earthquake struck nearby, killing 29 people. On 9 October 1995, a magnitude 8.0 earthquake struck west of the 2022 event, killing 49 people and leaving 1,000 others homeless. The most deadly earthquake in the region also occurred in Michoacán exactly 37 years earlier. This magnitude 8.0 earthquake killed thousands of people, injured about 30,000, and left 100,000 people homeless.

== Earthquake ==
The earthquake occurred as a result of thrust faulting, on the tectonic boundary between the Cocos plate and the North American plate. This earthquake occurred close to events in 1985, 1995 and 2003. The United States Geological Survey said that earthquakes of this size typically rupture over an area measuring 90 km (56 mi) x 40 km (25 mi). A majority of coseismic slip occurred directly beneath land rather than offshore with a maximum displacement at 1.2 m (3 ft 11 in). The subduction interface ruptured at 10–30 km (6.2–18.6 mi) depth and 80 km (50 mi) along the subduction strike. The event produced a maximum slip of 2.9 m (9 ft 6 in). The rupture area overlapped that of a M_{w} 7.6 earthquake in 1973 with similar rupture size and source duration.

=== Tsunami ===
In Manzanillo, Colima, a tsunami was observed reaching 0.95 m (3.1 ft). The tsunami reached 1.24 m (4 ft 1 in) at a lagoon near Manzanillo, flooding the coastal neighbourhood of Valle de Las Garzas. Near the epicenter, the National Mareographic Service recorded a 1.75 m (5 ft 9 in) tsunami, and at Acapulco, the tsunami measured 0.635 m (2 ft 1.0 in). In Zihuatanejo, Guerrero, the tsunami had heights of at least 32 cm (1.05 ft). Sea level fluctuations at Las Salinas lagoon in Zihuatanejo were observed. A tsunami of 12 cm (0.39 ft) was observed in Galapagos Islands, Ecuador.

A seiche reaching 4 feet (1.2 metres) occurred in Devils Hole at Death Valley National Park in the United States, about 1,500 miles (2,400 kilometres) away.

== Impact ==
=== Colima ===
Two people were killed and nine were injured in Colima. At least 2,790 homes across 10 municipalities, 20 buildings, two temples and seven medical facilities were damaged. Five bridges and eight roads were destroyed. In Manzanillo, one person died when a fence fell on him and some landslides were reported. At Point Plaza Bahia, a mall in the city, a gym partially collapsed, killing one person. Communications were disrupted in Tecomán and Comala, close to the epicentre. A gas tank explosion in Tecomán left four people, including two children, injured.

=== Michoacán ===
At least 3,161 homes and 89 schools were affected across Coalcomán, Chinicuila, Coahuayana and Aquila— 800 of which collapsed. The heaviest damage was in Coahuayana, where 1,143 homes were impacted, including 398 which were razed. Damage was reported in 21 hospitals but only two had to be evacuated. Structural damage occurred in eight churches. Several bridges and communication lines were affected. One road collapsed. In Coahuayana, 26 people were injured including one due to a gas explosion.

=== Jalisco ===
In Guadalajara, a man's arm was amputated at the elbow during an elevator accident. Debris fell from the temples of San Agustín and La Merced in the city center. At Puerto Vallarta, ceilings and windows fell from buildings, and some apartment buildings showed cracks between slabs, beams and ground floors. In the town of Tolimán, at least eight houses collapsed.

=== Nayarit ===
In the state capital, both towers of Tepic Cathedral were heavily damaged, with debris falling from one. In the Villas de Arana subdivision, homes and a hospital were damaged. At Ixtlán del Río, the fence of an elementary school and a financial building were damaged. Stores were damaged and items fell in Bahía de Banderas. An abandoned school in Compostela cracked. Two people were injured in San Blas; one during a motorcycle accident and another due to a fall.

=== Mexico City ===
In Mexico City, buildings swayed, and at least 97 structures were reported to have sustained slight to moderate damage, some of which were already damaged by previous earthquakes. The earthquake intensity on Mercalli Scale was V (Moderate) in Mexico City At least 76 schools in the city were among those damaged. One school was significantly damaged and lessons were suspended.

=== Elsewhere ===
In addition to the areas identified above, the earthquake was felt strongly in parts of Aguascalientes, Guanajuato, Guerrero, Hidalgo, México, Morelos, Oaxaca, Puebla, Querétaro, Tlaxcala, and Zacatecas.

== Aftershocks ==
Over 2,000 aftershocks were recorded. A M_{w} 5.8 aftershock at 02:17 on 20 September occurred at a depth of 54.5 km (33.9 mi) and was the result of normal faulting along a NW–SE striking, shallow NE dipping plane or a SE–NW striking, steep SW dipping plane.

A magnitude 6.8 aftershock at 01:16 on 22 September at a depth of 20.7 km (12.9 mi) caused power outages in many areas, including Mexico City, where two people were killed; one after falling from a staircase and another due to a heart attack. At least 22 buildings were also damaged in the city, one of them seriously. The quake damaged at least one building in the city of Uruapan. In Colima, a 5-month-old baby died when a gas explosion occurred. Five others were also injured, including two from said gas explosion. In the city of Metepec, in the state of Mexico, at least four school buildings were slightly damaged.

== See also ==
- List of earthquakes in 2022
- List of earthquakes in Mexico
- 1973 Colima earthquake
