= Pacific Coast of Mexico =

Western coastline of Mexico

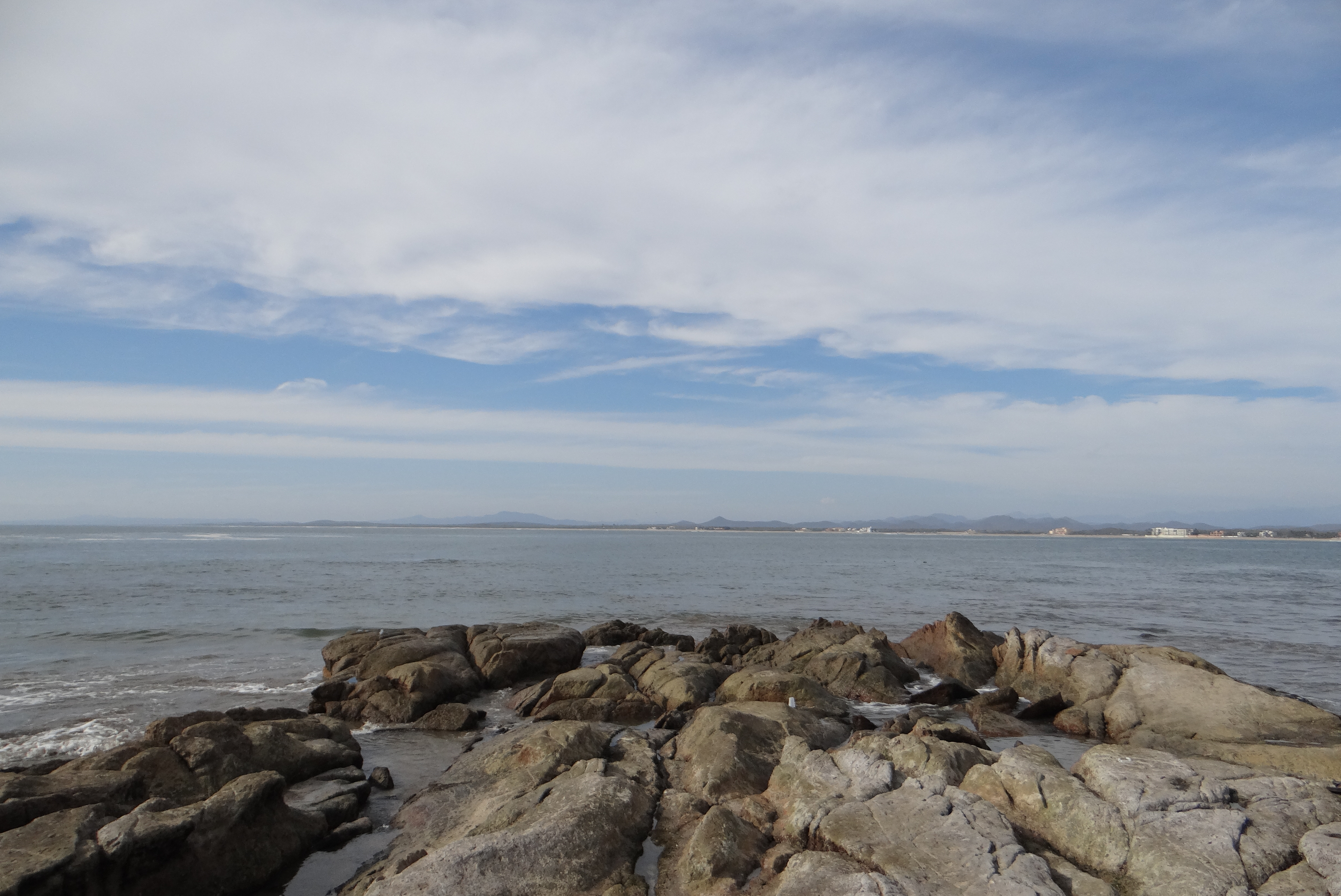
Playa Cerritos, where the Pacific Ocean and the Gulf of California meet

The Pacific Coast of Mexico (Spanish: Costa del Pacífico de México) or West Coast of Mexico (Costa Oeste de México) stretches along the coasts of western Mexico at the Pacific Ocean and its Gulf of California (Sea of Cortez).

== Geography ==
=== Baja California peninsula ===
On the western Baja California peninsula coast, it extends from the border with the United States at Tijuana in the state of Baja California, south to the tip of the peninsula at Cabo San Lucas in the state of Baja California Sur. On the peninsula's eastern coast it extends from the head of the Gulf of California to Cabo San Lucas.

=== Mainland ===
Along Mexico's western mainland its Pacific Coast extends from the head of the eastern Gulf of California near the Colorado River Delta in the state of Sonora to south of the gulf to the open Pacific, and then further south to the border with Guatemala in the state of Chiapas near Tapachula.

== Settlements ==
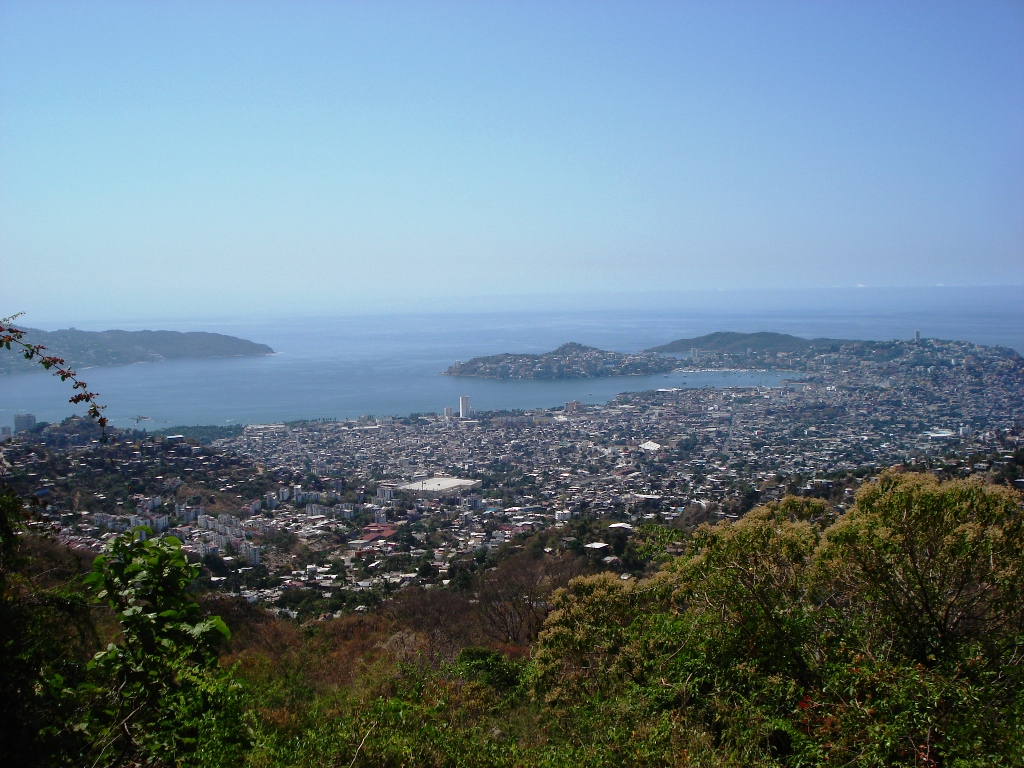
Acapulco

Major Pacific coastal cities include Tijuana, Ensenada, Mazatlán, Puerto Vallarta, Acapulco, and Salina Cruz.

=== Ports ===
Major ports along the Pacific Coast of Mexico included the Port of Ensenada, the Port of Lázaro Cárdenas, the Port of Chiapas, and the Port of Manzanillo.

== History ==
By the 8th century in the Acapulco Bay area, there was a small culture first be dominated by the Olmecs, then the Teotihuacan, the Maya, and in 1486 by the Aztec Empire.

After the Spanish conquest of the Aztec Empire (1519−1521), the Pacific Coast of present-day Mexico was first seen by Europeans at Acapulco Bay. It occurred in either 1523 by explorers sent by Hernán Cortés via land, or in 1526 by Santiago Guevara via ship.

The Augustinian friar and navigator Andrés de Urdaneta had discovered the return Spanish trade route (tornaviaje) from the colonial Philippines to the Pacific Coast of Mexico in 1565, using the Pacific's volta do mar. The Manila-Acapulco Galleons were Spanish trading ships that made round-trip sailing voyages annually across the Pacific Ocean, from the port of Acapulco in the Spanish colonial México to Manila in the Spanish East Indies and back. Both under the colonial Viceroyalty of New Spain.

"Manila Galleons" is also used to refer to the trade route between colonial Acapulco and Manila, which lasted from 1565 to 1815.

== See also ==
- Gulf Coast of Mexico
- Coasts of the Pacific Ocean
- West Coast of the United States
