= List of earthquakes in 1973 =

Earthquakes in 1973
Approximate epicenters of the earthquakes in 1973
- 4.0–5.9 magnitude
- 6.0–6.9 magnitude
- 7.0–7.9 magnitude
- 8.0+ magnitude
- Strongest magnitude: Japan off the east coast of Hokkaido (Magnitude 7.7) June 17
- Deadliest: China, Sichuan Province (Magnitude 7.4) February 6, 2,199 deaths
- Total fatalities: 2,899

Number by magnitude
- 9.0+: 0
- 8.0–8.9: 0
- 7.0–7.9: 9
- 6.0–6.9: 57
- 5.0–5.9: 1333
- 4.0–4.9: 2557

This is a list of earthquakes in 1973. Only magnitude 6.0 or greater earthquakes appear on the list. Lower magnitude events are included if they have caused death, injury or damage. Events which occurred in remote areas will be excluded from the list as they wouldn't have generated significant media interest. All dates are listed according to UTC time. Maximum intensities are indicated on the Mercalli intensity scale and are sourced from United States Geological Survey (USGS) ShakeMap data. Both the number of large events and the death toll were substantially lower in 1973. There were 9 magnitude 7.0+ events. The largest of these was in Japan measuring 7.7. Russia and New Hebrides were active during the year with each country having 2 magnitude 7.0+ events. Nearly 3,000 deaths were reported with China being worst affected. Mexico also had a significant death toll.

== Overall ==
=== By death toll ===
Rank	Death toll	Magnitude	Location	MMI	Depth (km)	Date
1	2,199	7.4	China, Sichuan Province	X (Extreme)	33.0	February 6
2	600	7.1	Mexico, Oaxaca	VIII (Severe)	84.0	August 28
3	56	7.5	Mexico, Michoacan	X (Extreme)	43.0	January 30
4	26	6.5	Costa Rica, Alajuela Province	VI (Strong)	33.0	April 14
5	15	7.0	Philippines, Luzon	IX (Violent)	33.0	March 17

- Note: At least 10 casualties

=== By magnitude ===
Rank	Magnitude	Death toll	Location	MMI	Depth (km)	Date
1	7.8	0	Japan, off the east coast of Hokkaido	VIII (Severe)	48.0	June 17
2	7.7	0	North Korea, offshore	V (Moderate)	575.0	September 29
3	7.6	56	Mexico, Michoacán	X (Extreme)	43.0	January 30
4	7.5	0	New Hebrides, Vanuatu	VIII (Severe)	26.0	December 28
5	7.4	2,199	China, Sichuan Province	X (Extreme)	33.0	February 6
6	7.2	0	Soviet Union, Kuril Islands, Russia	VIII (Severe)	27.0	February 28
6	7.2	0	New Hebrides, Vanuatu	VIII (Severe)	47.0	December 29
7	7.1	0	Soviet Union, Kuril Islands, Russia	VIII (Severe)	50.0	June 24
8	7.0	15	Philippines, Luzon	IX (Violent)	33.0	March 17
8	7.0	0	United Kingdom, east of the South Sandwich Islands	( )	33.0	October 6

- Note: At least 7.0 magnitude

== Notable events ==
=== January ===
January
- Strongest magnitude: 7.5 M_{w} Mexico
- Deadliest: 7.5 M_{w} Mexico; 56 deaths
- Total fatalities: 56

Number by magnitude
- 8.0–8.9: 0
- 7.0–7.9: 1
- 6.0–6.9: 4
- 5.0–5.9: 101
- 4.0–4.9: 193

Date	Country and location	M_{w}	Depth (km)	MMI	Notes	Casualties	
Date	Country and location	M_{w}	Depth (km)	MMI	Notes	Dead	Injured
5	New Zealand, Manawatū-Whanganui, North Island	6.6	150.0	IV			
6	New Hebrides, Vanuatu	6.1	36.0	VI			
18	Australia, south of New Britain, Papua New Guinea	6.7	43.0	VI			
22	Mexico, off the coast of Jalisco	6.1	33.0				
30	Mexico, Michoacán	7.6	43.0	X	Main article: 1973 Colima earthquake	56	390

=== February ===
February
- Strongest magnitude: 7.5 M_{w} Soviet Union
- Deadliest: 7.4 M_{w} China; 2,199 deaths
- Total fatalities: 2,199

Number by magnitude
- 8.0–8.9: 0
- 7.0–7.9: 2
- 6.0–6.9: 1
- 5.0–5.9: 96
- 4.0–4.9: 204

Date	Country and location	M_{w}	Depth (km)	MMI	Notes	Casualties	
Date	Country and location	M_{w}	Depth (km)	MMI	Notes	Dead	Injured
1	Argentina, Jujuy Province	6.3	229.0				
6	China, Sichuan Province	7.4	33.0	X	Main article: 1973 Luhuo earthquake	2,199	2,743
21	New Zealand, Hawke's Bay Region, North Island	5.1	38.0	VI	Moderate damage		
21	United States, southern California	5.8	10.0	VII	Main article: 1973 Point Mugu earthquake		
24	Iran, Fars province	5.2	27.0		Severe damage		
28	Soviet Union, Kuril Islands, Russia	7.5	27.0	VIII	Minor damage in Severo-Kurilsk.		

=== March ===
March
- Strongest magnitude: 7.0 M_{w} Philippines
- Deadliest: 7.0 M_{w} Philippines; 15 deaths
- Total fatalities: 15

Number by magnitude
- 8.0–8.9: 0
- 7.0–7.9: 1
- 6.0–6.9: 4
- 5.0–5.9: 105
- 4.0–4.9: 208

Date	Country and location	M_{w}	Depth (km)	MMI	Notes	Casualties	
Date	Country and location	M_{w}	Depth (km)	MMI	Notes	Dead	Injured
4	Soviet Union, eastern Kamchatka, Russia	6.3	32.0				
9	Australia, New South Wales	5.1	20.0	VII	Property damage estimated $500,000 (1973 rate).		
12	Soviet Union, Kuril Islands, Russia	6.3	54.0	V	Aftershock of February 28 event.		
17	New Hebrides, Vanuatu	6.1	194.0				
17	Philippines, Luzon	7.4	33.0	VII	Main article: 1973 Ragay Gulf earthquake	15	64
18	Indonesia, Molucca Sea	6.6	33.0				

=== April ===
April
- Strongest magnitude: 6.6 M_{w} India
- Deadliest: 6.5 M_{w} Costa Rica; 26 deaths
- Total fatalities: 27

Number by magnitude
- 8.0–8.9: 0
- 7.0–7.9: 0
- 6.0–6.9: 9
- 5.0–5.9: 87
- 4.0–4.9: 287

Date	Country and location	M_{w}	Depth (km)	MMI	Notes	Casualties	
Date	Country and location	M_{w}	Depth (km)	MMI	Notes	Dead	Injured
1	France, Gulf of Tadjoura, Djibouti	6.2	31.0	VII	Some damage in Djibouti and 10 people injured.		10
3	Colombia, Quindío Department	6.3	158.0	III	Damage in Pereira, Armenia and Ibagué.		
7	India, Nicobar Islands	6.6	33.0				
8	New Hebrides, Vanuatu	6.4	35.0	VI			
12	Soviet Union, Kuril Islands, Russia	6.2	52.0		Aftershock of February 28 event.		
14	Costa Rica, Alajuela Province	6.5	33.0	VI	26 people were killed and 100 were injured. Damage costs were $200,000 (1973 rate).	26	100
17	Indonesia, Papua (province)	6.3	33.0	VI			
24	Colombia, off the west coast of	6.5	50.0	IV	1 person died and some damage was reported.	1	
26	United States, Hawaii (island)	6.4	36.9	VIII	11 people were injured and some property damage was reported. Costs were $5.75 million (1973 rate).		11

=== May ===
May
- Strongest magnitude: 6.2 M_{w} Indian Ocean
- Total fatalities: 0

Number by magnitude
- 8.0–8.9: 0
- 7.0–7.9: 0
- 6.0–6.9: 5
- 5.0–5.9: 79
- 4.0–4.9: 190

Date	Country and location	M_{w}	Depth (km)	MMI	Notes	Casualties	
Date	Country and location	M_{w}	Depth (km)	MMI	Notes	Dead	Injured
12	Papua New Guinea, offshore, 52 km north of Rabaul	6.1	20.0	VI			
26	Alaska, offshore, 222 km west–southest of Adak	6.0	31.3	V			
28	Indian Ocean, 262 km northeast of Port Mathurin	6.2	24.1				
28	Alaska, offshore, 245 km east–southeast of Attu Station	6.0	25.0	I			
28	India, offshore, 13 km west–southwest of Churāchāndpur	6.1	55.0	VI			

=== June ===
June
- Strongest magnitude: 7.8 M_{w} Japan
- Total fatalities: 0

Number by magnitude
- 8.0–8.9: 0
- 7.0–7.9: 2
- 6.0–6.9: 4
- 5.0–5.9: 155
- 4.0–4.9: 269

Date	Country and location	M_{w}	Depth (km)	MMI	Notes	Casualties	
Date	Country and location	M_{w}	Depth (km)	MMI	Notes	Dead	Injured
5	New Hebrides, Vanuatu	6.2	24.0	IV			
9	United Kingdom, Makira, Solomon Islands	6.5	70.0	V			
17	Japan, off the east coast of Hokkaido	7.8	48.0	VIII	Main article: 1973 Nemuro earthquake		27
17	Japan, off the east coast of Hokkaido	6.2	50.0		Aftershock.		
24	Soviet Union, Kuril Islands, Russia	7.3	50.0	VIII	One person was injured and some damage was reported. Aftershock of June 17 event.		1
26	Soviet Union, Kuril Islands, Russia	6.9	50.0	IV	Aftershock.		

=== July ===
July
- Strongest magnitude: 6.9 M_{w} China
- Total fatalities: 0

Number by magnitude
- 8.0–8.9: 0
- 7.0–7.9: 0
- 6.0–6.9: 7
- 5.0–5.9: 153
- 4.0–4.9: 234

Date	Country and location	M_{w}	Depth (km)	MMI	Notes	Casualties	
Date	Country and location	M_{w}	Depth (km)	MMI	Notes	Dead	Injured
1	United States, off the southeast coast of Alaska	6.7	33.0	V			
3	Philippines, Samar	6.1	44.0	V	Foreshock.		
3	Philippines, Samar	6.5	33.0	VI			
5	Philippines, north of Samar	6.3	38.0	IV	Aftershock.		
14	China, Xizang Province	6.6	33.0	VII			
31	Chile, off the coast of Atacama Region	6.5	33.0	V			
31	United Kingdom, Solomon Islands	6.2	30.0	VII			

=== August ===
August
- Strongest magnitude: 7.1 M_{w} Mexico
- Deadliest: 7.1 M_{w} Mexico; 600 deaths
- Total fatalities: 600

Number by magnitude
- 8.0–8.9: 0
- 7.0–7.9: 2
- 6.0–6.9: 10
- 5.0–5.9: 104
- 4.0–4.9: 189

Date	Country and location	M_{w}	Depth (km)	MMI	Notes	Casualties	
Date	Country and location	M_{w}	Depth (km)	MMI	Notes	Dead	Injured
1	New Hebrides, Vanuatu	7.0	200.0	IV			
5	Tonga	6.0	33.0				
7	Chile, off the coast of Atacama Region	6.2	25.0	VI	Foreshock.		
7	Chile, off the coast of Atacama Region	6.4	14.0	VII			
13	Australia, East Sepik Province, Papua New Guinea	6.0	112.0	IV			
16	China, Yunnan Province	6.0	33.0	VI			
18	Philippines, west of Panay	6.3	14.0	VI			
28	Mexico, Oaxaca	7.1	84.0	VIII	Main article: 1973 Veracruz earthquake	600	

=== September ===
September
- Strongest magnitude: 7.7 M_{w} North Korea
- Total fatalities: 0

Number by magnitude
- 8.0–8.9: 0
- 7.0–7.9: 1
- 6.0–6.9: 2
- 5.0–5.9: 96
- 4.0–4.9: 173

Date	Country and location	M_{w}	Depth (km)	MMI	Notes	Casualties	
Date	Country and location	M_{w}	Depth (km)	MMI	Notes	Dead	Injured
10	Soviet Union, off the coast of Primorsky Krai, Russia	6.7	532.0	II			
20	Philippines, Bohol Sea	6.5	560.0	I			
29	North Korea, off the east coast of	7.7	575.0	V			

=== October ===
October
- Strongest magnitude: 7.0 M_{w} United Kingdom
- Total fatalities: 0

Number by magnitude
- 8.0–8.9: 0
- 7.0–7.9: 0
- 6.0–6.9: 5
- 5.0–5.9: 99
- 4.0–4.9: 232

Date	Country and location	M_{w}	Depth (km)	MMI	Notes	Casualties	
Date	Country and location	M_{w}	Depth (km)	MMI	Notes	Dead	Injured
5	Chile, off the coast of Valparaíso Region	6.7	14.0	V	Damage in Valparaíso.		
5	Chile, off the coast of Valparaíso Region	6.1	33.0	VII			
6	Atlantic Ocean, east of the South Sandwich Islands	6.9	33.0				
9	New Hebrides, Vanuatu	6.3	33.0	VI			
25	Bolivia, Tarija Department	6.6	529.0				

=== November ===
November
- Strongest magnitude: 6.4 M_{w} United States
- Deadliest: 2 events caused 1 death each in Iran and Portugal
- Total fatalities: 2

Number by magnitude
- 8.0–8.9: 0
- 7.0–7.9: 0
- 6.0–6.9: 6
- 5.0–5.9: 128
- 4.0–4.9: 188

Date	Country and location	M_{w}	Depth (km)	MMI	Notes	Casualties	
Date	Country and location	M_{w}	Depth (km)	MMI	Notes	Dead	Injured
4	Greece, off the west coast	5.8	8.0	VIII	More than 1,400 homes damaged on Lefkada.		
6	United States, Andreanof Islands, Alaska	6.4	34.0	rowspan="2"| Doublet earthquake			
6	United States, Andreanof Islands, Alaska	6.3	41.0	IV			
8	Soviet Union, Kuril Islands, Russia	6.3	33.0	rowspan="2"| Doublet earthquake			
11	Soviet Union, Kuril Islands, Russia	6.0	51.0				
11	Iran, Fars province	5.8	11.0	VII	One person was killed and major damage was reported.	1	
19	Japan, off the east coast of Honshu	6.4	56.0	VI			
23	Portugal, Azores Islands	5.1	5.0	VIII	One person died and moderate damage.	1	
29	Greece, south of Crete	5.7	26.0	VIII	Some damage was reported.		
30	New Hebrides, Vanuatu	6.3	124.0	IV			

=== December ===
December
- Strongest magnitude: 7.5 M_{w} New Hebrides, Vanuatu
- Total fatalities: 0

Number by magnitude
- 8.0–8.9: 0
- 7.0–7.9: 1
- 6.0–6.9: 4
- 5.0–5.9: 125
- 4.0–4.9: 190

Date	Country and location	M_{w}	Depth (km)	MMI	Notes	Casualties	
Date	Country and location	M_{w}	Depth (km)	MMI	Notes	Dead	Injured
9	New Hebrides, Vanuatu	6.8	39.0	VII			
19	Indonesia, Sumba	6.2	58.0	V			
28	New Hebrides, Vanuatu	7.5	26.0	VIII	Some damage was caused.		
29	New Hebrides, Vanuatu	6.9	47.0	VIII	Aftershock. Some damage was caused.		
30	New Hebrides, Vanuatu	6.6	10.0	VIII	Aftershock.		
