= 1973 Nemuro earthquake =

Earthquake off the coast of Hokkaido, Japan

- Location within Japan
- UTC time: 1973-06-17 03:55:02
- ISC event: 759446
- 759790
- USGS-ANSS: ComCat
- Local date: 17 June 1973
- Local time: 12:55 JST
- Magnitude: 7.8–7.9 M_{w} 7.4 M_{JMA} 8.1 M_{t}
- Depth: 48 km (30 mi)
- Epicenter: 43.233°N 145.785°E
- Type: Thrust
- Areas affected: Japan
- Max. intensity: MMI VIII (Severe) JMA 5− – JMA 5+
- Tsunami: 5.98 meters
- Aftershocks: 7.1 M_{s} (June 1973) and 7.5–7.6 M_{w} (June 1975)
- Casualties: 27 injured

The Nemuro-Oki (Nemuro Peninsula Offshore) earthquake (Japanese: 根室半島沖地震, Hepburn: Nemurohantō oki jishin) in scientific literature, occurred on June 17 at 12:55 local time. It struck with an epicenter just off the Nemuro Peninsula in northern Hokkaidō, Japan. It measured 7.8–7.9 on the moment magnitude scale (M_{w}), 8.1 on the tsunami magnitude scale (M_{t}) and 7.4 on the Japan Meteorological Agency magnitude scale (M_{JMA}).

The earthquake had a maximum Mercalli intensity of VIII (Severe) and measured 5 on the JMA intensity scale. It also triggered a tsunami with observed heights of nearly 3 meters hitting the coastal regions of Hokkaidō, causing damage. No deaths were recorded but twenty-seven individuals suffered injuries, mostly due to falling objects. The total damage from the earthquake is estimated at US$5 million.

== Historical seismicity ==
The term Nemuro-Oki earthquake refers to large earthquakes that have struck near the Nemuro Peninsula on the island of Hokkaidō in Japan. Earthquakes here are of the megathrust type that occur along subduction zones when the Pacific plate dives beneath the Okhotsk Sea plate along the Kuril Trench, located off the east coast of Hokkaidō and Kuril Islands. Subduction rate along the trench is estimated at 8 cm/yr. An average recurrence interval of 72.2 years spans between each large earthquake along this section of the subduction zone.

In 1894, a large subduction megathrust earthquake with an estimated magnitude of 8.3 M_{w} ruptured a 200 km section of the subduction zone. It generated a tsunami with wave heights of up to 4 meters slamming into the coast between 20 minutes to one hour after the earthquake. Both the earthquake and tsunami damaged many homes and caused ground fissures. The waves washed away many homes, a few vessels and bridges. At least one person was killed and some residents were injured.

== Earthquake ==
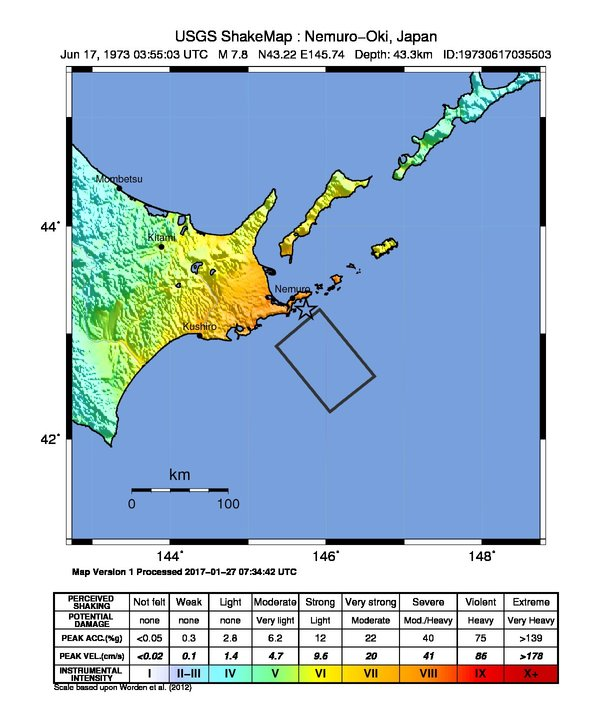
USGS ShakeMap of the 1973 Nemuro Peninsula earthquake.

The 1973 magnitude 7.9 earthquake struck at a depth of 48 km beneath the Nemuro Peninsula. A rectangular rupture patch is located between that of the 1952 Tokachi and 1969 Kuril Islands earthquakes were the source area of the 1973 event. This section of the subduction zone was previously designated a seismic gap due to the lack of seismic activity throughout the last 80 years, and is thought to be capable of a magnitude 8.0 quake. Because of its location, this event was believed to be a repeat of the 1894 earthquake but was later discovered that the 1973 quake had only ruptured the eastern half. Therefore, the 1973 event was a much smaller event than in 1894. An 80 km-long section in the subduction zone between the 1973 and 1952 rupture zones still exist, with the possibility of generating a large earthquake.

Focal mechanism analysis revealed that this earthquake was the result of thrust faulting along the subduction plate boundary. Waveform inversion on teleseismic seismographs showed that the earthquake ruptured upwards, to the trench, or in a south–southeast direction. The maximum slip along the fault is estimated at 2.7 meters.

== Tsunami ==
Immediately after the earthquake, at 13:06 local time, the Sapporo District Meteorological Observatory broadcast a tsunami warning to residents along the Pacific coast of Hokkaidō. Residents of the Tōhoku region would receive a tsunami warning at 13:13. The tsunami with heights ranging from 2.81 to 5.98 meters struck the coast a few hours later at 15:20, causing damage to about 300 buildings. No deaths were reported from the tsunami.

Due to the advanced tsunami warning systems in place and frequent tsunami and earthquake drills in the region, impact from the tsunami was minimal.

== Aftershocks ==
Seven days after the mainshock, a magnitude (M_{s}) 7.1 earthquake struck west of the Nemuro Peninsula at a depth of 50 km. It had a maximum Mercalli intensity of VIII or a JMA intensity of 5, lasting for less than a minute. In the community of Goryachiy Plyazh and Golovnino on Kunashir Island, it was felt stronger than the mainshock. Some frightened residents jumped from the windows of their homes. One person was injured and some minor damage was reported in Kushiro, Hokkaidō.

=== 1975 earthquake ===
The earthquake which struck on June 10, 1975, was also considered an aftershock. It ruptured the shallow interface of the Kuril Subduction Zone with a focal depth of 15 km, between the rupture zones of the 1973 and 1969 earthquakes. Although it had a smaller surface wave magnitude and JMA magnitude of 7.1, it generated tsunami run-ups higher than the mainshock, at 5.5 meters. Further analysis of event data has enabled the recalculation of the moment magnitude and tsunami magnitude of the earthquake. Two studies in 1978 and 1977 calculated the magnitude to be M_{w} 7.5–7.6 and 7.7, respectively. Estimating the tsunami magnitude of the event using tsunami data assigned this event an M_{t} of 7.9. The 1975 aftershock is considered a tsunami earthquake due to the disproportionately large tsunami that it generated.

== See also ==
- List of earthquakes in 1973
- List of earthquakes in Japan
