= 1932 Eureka earthquake =

Earthquake in California

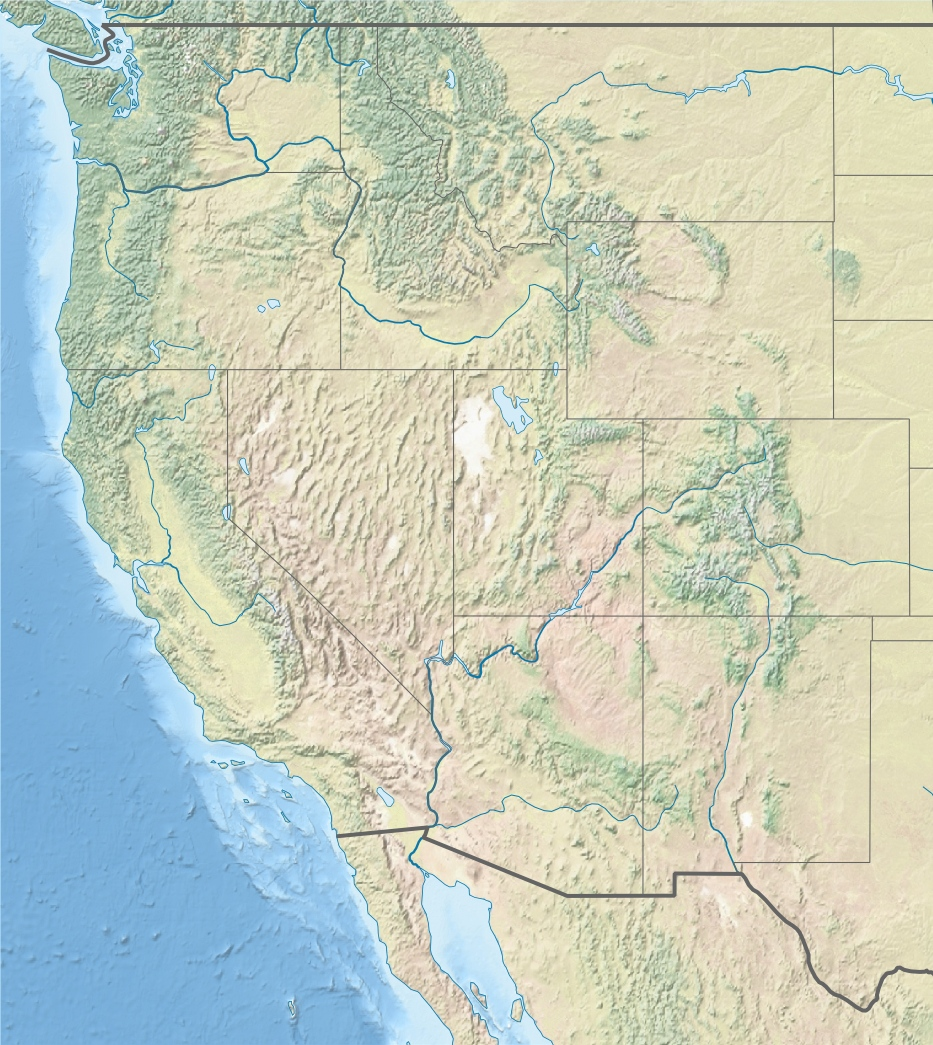
- UTC time: 1932-06-06 08:44:26
- ISC event: 906203
- USGS-ANSS: ComCat
- Local date: June 6, 1932
- Local time: 00:44:26
- Magnitude: 6.4 M_{w}
- Depth: 9.3 mi (15 km)
- Epicenter: 40.73°N 124.21°W
- Type: Unknown
- Areas affected: North Coast (California); United States
- Max. intensity: MMI VIII (Severe)
- Casualties: One dead, three injured

The 1932 Eureka earthquake occurred on June 6 at 00:44:26 local time along the northern coastal area of California in the United States. With a moment magnitude of 6.4 and a maximum Mercalli intensity of VIII (Severe), this earthquake left one person dead from a falling chimney and several injured. The shock was the largest in the area since 1923 and was felt in southern Oregon and northern California.

== Tectonic setting ==
Near Cape Mendocino, the Mendocino triple junction is an area of active seismicity where three tectonic plates come together. The Mendocino fracture zone (also known as the Mendocino Fault east of the Gorda Ridge) is a transform fault that separates the Pacific and Gorda plates. To the south, the relative motion between the Pacific plate and North American plate is accommodated by the San Andreas Fault, and to the north, the Gorda plate is converging with the North American plate at the Cascadia subduction zone.

== See also ==
- List of earthquakes in 1932
- List of earthquakes in California
- List of earthquakes in the United States
