= List of earthquakes in 1932 =

Earthquakes in 1932
Approximate epicenters of notable earthquakes in 1932
- 4.0–5.9 magnitude
- 6.0–6.9 magnitude
- 7.0–7.9 magnitude
- 8.0+ magnitude
- Strongest: Mexico, Jalisco (Magnitude 8.1) June 3
- Deadliest: Iran, Mazandaran Province (Magnitude 5.4) May 20 1,070 deaths
- Total fatalities: 2,206

Number by magnitude
- 9.0+: 0

This is a list of earthquakes in 1932. Only magnitude 6.0 or greater earthquakes appear on the list. Lower magnitude events are included if they have caused death, injury or damage. Events which occurred in remote areas will be excluded from the list as they wouldn't have generated significant media interest. All dates are listed according to UTC time. Overall a much quieter year than 1931 in terms of magnitude 7.0+ events. There was however still a couple of large earthquakes which shook parts of Dutch East Indies, China, Greece and especially Mexico. The worst event in terms of death toll happened in Iran which has experienced deadly events also in 1930 and 1931.

== Overall ==
=== By death toll ===
Rank	Death toll	Magnitude	Location	MMI	Depth (km)	Date
1	1,070	5.4	Iran, Mazandaran Province	VIII (Severe)	12.0	May 20
2	404	8.1	Mexico, Jalisco	X (Extreme)	15.0	June 3
3	275	7.9	China, Gansu Province	X (Extreme)	15.0	December 25
4	200	6.0	China, Sichuan Province	VIII (Severe)	0.0	March 6
5	161	6.9	Greece, Central Macedonia	X (Extreme)	10.0	September 26
6	75	7.7	Mexico, Jalisco	( )	25.0	June 22

- Note: At least 10 casualties

=== By magnitude ===
Rank	Magnitude	Death toll	Location	MMI	Depth (km)	Date
1	8.1	404	Mexico, Jalisco	X (Extreme)	15.0	June 3
2	7.9	275	China, Gansu Province	X (Extreme)	15.0	December 25
3	7.8	0	Mexico, Colima	X (Extreme)	15.0	June 18
= 4	7.7	6	Dutch East Indies, Molucca Sea	VII (Very strong)	15.0	May 14
= 4	7.7	75	Mexico, Jalisco	( )	15.0	June 22
5	7.6	0	Fiji, south of	( )	570.0	May 26
= 6	7.2	0	New Guinea, southwest of Bougainville Island	( )	15.0	January 29
= 6	7.2	0	Dutch East Indies, Celebes Sea	( )	57.5	December 4
7	7.1	0	El Salvador, La Union Department	( )	15.0	May 21
= 8	7.0	0	British Burma, Sagaing Region	( )	110.0	August 14
= 8	7.0	0	Sea of Japan	( )	320.0	November 13

- Note: At least 7.0 magnitude

== Notable events ==
=== January ===
January
- Strongest: 7.2 M_{w} New Guinea
- Total fatalities: 0

Number by magnitude
- 8.0–8.9: 0
- 7.0–7.9: 1
- 6.0–6.9: 4

Date	Country and location	M_{w}	Depth (km)	MMI	Notes	Casualties	
Date	Country and location	M_{w}	Depth (km)	MMI	Notes	Dead	Injured
9	New Guinea, west of Bougainville Island	6.9	395.0				
20	Peru, Lima Region	6.8	35.0	IX			
24	New Hebrides	6.5	15.0				
29	New Guinea, southwest of Bougainville Island	7.2	15.0				
29	New Guinea, southwest of Bougainville Island	6.5	35.0		Aftershock.		

=== February ===
February
- Strongest: 6.7 M_{w} Cuba
- Deadliest: 6.7 M_{w} Cuba; 8 deaths
- Total fatalities: 8

Number by magnitude
- 8.0–8.9: 0
- 7.0–7.9: 0
- 6.0–6.9: 2

Date	Country and location	M_{w}	Depth (km)	MMI	Notes	Casualties	
Date	Country and location	M_{w}	Depth (km)	MMI	Notes	Dead	Injured
3	Cuba, off the southeast coast	6.7	25.0		8 people were killed and major damage was caused.	8	
23	British Solomon Islands	6.5	60.0				

=== March ===
March
- Strongest: 6.8 M_{w} 2 events
- Deadliest: 6.0 M_{w} China; 200 deaths
- Total fatalities: 200

Number by magnitude
- 8.0–8.9: 0
- 7.0–7.9: 0
- 6.0–6.9: 9

Date	Country and location	M_{w}	Depth (km)	MMI	Notes	Casualties	
Date	Country and location	M_{w}	Depth (km)	MMI	Notes	Dead	Injured
6	China, Sichuan Province	6.0	0.0	VIII	200 people were killed and some homes were destroyed. Depth unknown.	200	
8	New Guinea, southwest of Bougainville Island	6.5	70.0				
8	Fiji	6.2	35.0	VII	Some damage was reported.		
14	Mexico, Gulf of California	6.0	35.0				
14	Venezuela, Tachira	6.8	35.0				
19	New Guinea, Tabar Island	6.5	350.0				
25	United States, central Alaska	6.0	35.0		Foreshock.		
25	United States, central Alaska	6.8	15.0				
26	Dutch East Indies, Banda Sea	6.6	35.0				

=== April ===
April
- Strongest: 6.8 M_{w} Japan
- Deadliest: 6.0 M_{w} China; 6 deaths
- Total fatalities: 6

Number by magnitude
- 8.0–8.9: 0
- 7.0–7.9: 0
- 6.0–6.9: 8

Date	Country and location	M_{w}	Depth (km)	MMI	Notes	Casualties	
Date	Country and location	M_{w}	Depth (km)	MMI	Notes	Dead	Injured
3	Afghanistan, Badakhshan Province	6.0	250.0				
3	New Zealand, Kermadec Islands	6.5	35.0				
4	Japan, Izu Islands	6.8	390.0				
6	China, Henan Province	6.0	35.0	VIII	6 people were killed and 27 were injured. Many homes were destroyed.	6	27
12	New Guinea, New Britain	6.2	35.0				
18	Pakistan, off the coast of	6.0	35.0				
22	Dutch East Indies, southern Sumatra	6.5	80.0				
26	Chile, Antofagasta Region	6.5	70.0				

=== May ===
May
- Strongest: 7.7 M_{w} Dutch East Indies
- Deadliest: 5.4 M_{w} Iran; 1,070 deaths
- Total fatalities: 1,076

Number by magnitude
- 8.0–8.9: 0
- 7.0–7.9: 3
- 6.0–6.9: 9
- 5.0–5.9: 1

Date	Country and location	M_{w}	Depth (km)	MMI	Notes	Casualties	
Date	Country and location	M_{w}	Depth (km)	MMI	Notes	Dead	Injured
4	Dutch East Indies, Minahassa Peninsula, Sulawesi	6.0	200.0				
5	Japan, Osaka Prefecture, Honshu	6.5	380.0				
10	Dutch East Indies, Banda Sea	6.0	170.0				
12	Dutch East Indies, Molucca Sea	6.5	170.0		Foreshock.		
14	Dutch East Indies, Molucca Sea	7.7	15.0	VII	6 people were killed and 115 were injured. 592 homes were destroyed.	6	115
17	Dutch East Indies, Bali	6.2	80.0				
20	Iran, Mazandaran Province	5.4	12.0	VIII	1,070 deaths were caused as well as major damage in the area.	1,070	
21	El Salvador, La Union Department	7.1	15.0				
21	Dutch East Indies, Sunda Strait	6.5	100.0				
22	Guatemala, Jutiapa Department	6.0	80.0				
26	Fiji, south of	7.6	570.0				
26	Fiji, south of	6.5	600.0		Aftershock.		
28	Japan, southeast of the Ryukyu Islands	6.5	60.0				

=== June ===
June
- Strongest: 8.1 M_{w} Mexico
- Deadliest: 8.1 M_{w} Mexico; 404 deaths
- Total fatalities: 480

Number by magnitude
- 8.0–8.9: 1
- 7.0–7.9: 2
- 6.0–6.9: 13

Date	Country and location	M_{w}	Depth (km)	MMI	Notes	Casualties	
Date	Country and location	M_{w}	Depth (km)	MMI	Notes	Dead	Injured
3	Mexico, Jalisco	8.1	15.0	X	This was the first of the 1932 Jalisco earthquakes. During June several large earthquakes shook the area causing extensive destruction. 400 people died in this event and 120 were injured. Many homes were destroyed. A tsunami caused an additional 4 deaths and damage.	404	120
3	Mexico, Jalisco	6.0	35.0		Aftershock.		
5	Mexico, Jalisco	6.2	35.0		Aftershock.		
6	United States, northern California	6.4	15.0		1 person died and another 3 were hurt in the 1932 Eureka earthquake. Some damage was caused.	1	3
6	Cuba, south of	6.0	35.0				
8	Philippines, eastern Mindanao	6.2	100.0				
8	United States, central Alaska	6.0	0.0		Depth unknown.		
10	Philippines, southeast of Mindanao	6.8	105.0				
14	Philippines, northwest of Luzon	6.5	80.0				
14	Philippines, west of Luzon	6.0	40.0		Aftershock.		
16	Dutch East Indies, northern Sumatra	6.8	80.0				
18	Chile, off the coast of Tarapaca Region	6.2	70.0				
18	Mexico, Colima	7.8	15.0	X	1932 Jalisco earthquakes. Some damage was caused.		
21	Mexico, Oaxaca	6.0	35.0				
22	Japan, Ibaraki Prefecture, Honshu	6.0	40.0				
22	Mexico, Jalisco	7.7	25.0		1932 Jalisco earthquakes. The earthquake caused over 400 homes to collapse. A tsunami was generated which caused 75 deaths and 100 injuries.	75	100

=== July ===
July
- Strongest: 6.8 M_{w} 3 events
- Total fatalities: 0

Number by magnitude
- 8.0–8.9: 0
- 7.0–7.9: 0
- 6.0–6.9: 16

Date	Country and location	M_{w}	Depth (km)	MMI	Notes	Casualties	
Date	Country and location	M_{w}	Depth (km)	MMI	Notes	Dead	Injured
2	Dutch East Indies, Western New Guinea	6.0	35.0				
5	Dutch East Indies, off the southwest coast of Sumatra	6.0	80.0				
7	Mexico, Gulf of California	6.8	10.0				
9	New Hebrides	6.5	120.0				
9	Philippines, southeast of Mindanao	6.0	120.0				
10	Russian SFSR, Sakhalin	6.0	35.0				
12	Mexico, Gulf of California	6.7	10.0				
14	New Guinea, northeast of New Ireland (island)	6.2	150.0				
18	Philippines, southwest of Luzon	6.0	100.0				
20	Fiji, south of	6.5	170.0				
21	Dutch East Indies, Papua (province)	6.5	35.0				
25	Japan, Kyoto Prefecture, Honshu	6.8	360.0				
25	Mexico, off the coast of Colima	6.8	20.0		Aftershock.		
27	Dutch East Indies, Banda Sea	6.2	60.0				
29	Chile, Arica y Parinacota Region	6.0	110.0				
29	Dutch East Indies, Molucca Sea	6.5	200.0				

=== August ===
August
- Strongest: 7.0 M_{w} British Burma
- Total fatalities: 0

Number by magnitude
- 8.0–8.9: 0
- 7.0–7.9: 1
- 6.0–6.9: 7

Date	Country and location	M_{w}	Depth (km)	MMI	Notes	Casualties	
Date	Country and location	M_{w}	Depth (km)	MMI	Notes	Dead	Injured
2	Dutch East Indies, Molucca Sea	6.5	100.0				
4	Russian SFSR, off the east coast of Kamchatka	6.2	100.0				
11	Dutch East Indies, Java Sea	6.0	600.0				
12	United States, Fox Islands (Alaska)	6.6	25.0				
14	British Burma, Sagaing Region	7.0	110.0		Some damage was reported.		
21	Taiwan, off the east coast	6.5	25.0				
22	Yellow Sea	6.3	10.0				
24	Philippines, Luzon	6.2	35.0	VII	Some damage was reported.		

=== September ===
September
- Strongest: 6.9 M_{w} 3 events
- Deadliest: 6.9 M_{w} Greece; 161 deaths
- Total fatalities: 161

Number by magnitude
- 8.0–8.9: 0
- 7.0–7.9: 0
- 6.0–6.9: 13

Date	Country and location	M_{w}	Depth (km)	MMI	Notes	Casualties	
Date	Country and location	M_{w}	Depth (km)	MMI	Notes	Dead	Injured
2	Japan, Volcano Islands	6.5	140.0				
3	Japan, off the east coast of Honshu	6.2	25.0				
5	Peru, Piura Region	6.0	50.0				
8	Mexico, Colima	6.2	35.0				
9	Dutch East Indies, Seram	6.4	25.0	VII	73 homes were destroyed with many more being damaged.		
11	China, Xinjiang Province	6.0	35.0				
14	United States, southern Alaska	6.3	50.0				
15	Philippines, Sulu Archipelago	6.2	35.0				
15	New Zealand, Hawke's Bay (region), North Island	6.9	15.0		5 people were injured and some homes were destroyed.		5
23	Sea of Japan	6.9	320.0				
26	Greece, Central Macedonia	6.9	10.0	X	161 people were killed in the 1932 Ierissos earthquake. 669 were injured. 4,106 homes were destroyed and a further 3,218 were damaged. A tsunami was reported which destroyed a weir in the area.	161	669
29	Greece, Central Macedonia	6.3	10.0	XI	Aftershock.		
29	Russian SFSR, Kuril Islands	6.5	35.0				

=== October ===
October
- Strongest: 6.7 M_{w} Nicaragua
- Total fatalities: 0

Number by magnitude
- 8.0–8.9: 0
- 7.0–7.9: 0
- 6.0–6.9: 9

Date	Country and location	M_{w}	Depth (km)	MMI	Notes	Casualties	
Date	Country and location	M_{w}	Depth (km)	MMI	Notes	Dead	Injured
2	Nicaragua, off the west coast	6.7	30.0				
9	Taiwan, east of	6.0	130.0				
16	United States, Alaska Peninsula	6.6	25.0				
17	British Solomon Islands	6.2	100.0				
18	Dutch East Indies, Minahassa Peninsula, Sulawesi	6.5	200.0				
23	Taiwan, east of	6.2	35.0				
25	Russian SFSR, east of Sakhalin	6.5	410.0				
29	Kirghiz ASSR, Osh Region	6.0	35.0				
30	United States, south of Alaska	6.3	35.0				

=== November ===
November
- Strongest: 7.0 M_{w} Sea of Japan
- Total fatalities: 0

Number by magnitude
- 8.0–8.9: 0
- 7.0–7.9: 1
- 6.0–6.9: 6

Date	Country and location	M_{w}	Depth (km)	MMI	Notes	Casualties	
Date	Country and location	M_{w}	Depth (km)	MMI	Notes	Dead	Injured
1	Chile, Antofagasta Region	6.0	100.0				
13	Sea of Japan	7.0	320.0				
17	Mexico, Jalisco	6.2	35.0				
18	Dutch East Indies, Celebes Sea	6.5	280.0				
22	Dutch East Indies, Barat Daya Islands	6.5	180.0				
26	Japan, Hokkaido	6.4	57.5				
29	Chile, Valparaiso Region	6.6	35.0				

=== December ===
December
- Strongest: 7.9 M_{w} China
- Deadliest: 7.9 M_{w} China; 275 deaths
- Total fatalities: 275

Number by magnitude
- 8.0–8.9: 0
- 7.0–7.9: 2
- 6.0–6.9: 7

Date	Country and location	M_{w}	Depth (km)	MMI	Notes	Casualties	
Date	Country and location	M_{w}	Depth (km)	MMI	Notes	Dead	Injured
4	Dutch East Indies, Celebes Sea	7.2	15.0				
4	Dutch East Indies, Celebes Sea	6.4	15.0		Aftershock.		
7	Mexico, off the coast of Colima	6.6	15.0				
9	Peru, Ica Region	6.5	75.0				
21	United States, western Nevada	6.8	10.0		The 1932 Cedar Mountain earthquake was the strongest earthquake to hit Nevada since 1915. Some damage was caused. However, no deaths were reported.		
24	New Guinea, Bismarck Sea	6.6	15.0				
25	China, Gansu Province	7.9	15.0	X	The 1932 Changma earthquake caused 275 deaths and a further 320 injuries. 1,167 homes were destroyed.	275	320
26	Japan, Volcano Islands	6.5	280.0				
31	South Africa, off the east coast	6.8	15.0				
