= 1973 Point Mugu earthquake =

Earthquake in Southern California

- UTC time: 1973-02-21 14:45:57
- ISC event: 764165
- USGS-ANSS: ComCat
- Local date: February 21, 1973
- Local time: 06:45:57 PST
- Magnitude: 5.8 M_{w}
- Depth: 10 km (6.2 mi)
- Epicenter: 34.04°N 119.03°W
- Type: Oblique-slip
- Areas affected: South Coast (California); United States
- Total damage: $1,000,000
- Max. intensity: MMI VII (Very strong)
- Peak acceleration: 0.13 g
- Casualties: Several injured

The 1973 Point Mugu earthquake occurred at 06:45:57 local time on February 21 in the Point Mugu area of southeastern Ventura County of southern California. It had a moment magnitude of 5.8 and a maximum Mercalli Intensity of VII (Very strong). This oblique-slip shock resulted in several injuries and $1 million in damage. The epicenter was near the Oxnard Plain and the northern terminus of the Santa Monica Mountains, in the California South Coast region.

== Intensity ==
At the most extreme points of its perceptibility along the coast, it was felt between intensity I and III (Not felt – Weak) at San Luis Obispo in the north and San Diego in the south. Inland, it was felt at McFarland in the central valley and Cantil in the western Mojave Desert, and to the southeast in Palm Springs.

== See also ==
- Geology of Ventura County, California
- List of earthquakes in 1973
- List of earthquakes in California
- Point Mugu State Park
