= 1973 Veracruz earthquake =

Earthquake in Mexico

- Location within Veracruz Location within Mexico
- UTC time: 1973-08-28 09:50:41
- ISC event: 757676
- USGS-ANSS: ComCat
- Local date: August 28, 1973
- Local time: 3:50 a.m.
- Duration: 1–2 minutes
- Magnitude: 7.1 M_{w}
- Depth: 80.1 km (50 mi)
- Epicenter: 18.23°N 96.47°W
- Areas affected: Mexico
- Total damage: Severe
- Max. intensity: MMI VIII (Severe)
- Tsunami: No
- Casualties: 539–1,000 dead thousands injured

The 1973 Veracruz earthquake, also known as El Terremoto de Orizaba, occurred at 3:50 a.m. local time (9:50 GMT) on August 28, 1973, with the epicenter located in the vicinity of Ciudad Serdán in the Mexican state of Puebla. It registered 7.1 on the moment magnitude scale and had a maximum perceived intensity of VIII (Severe) on the Mercalli intensity scale. The effects were felt in the states of Veracruz and Puebla in southeast Mexico.

== Geography ==
The area that was damaged in Veracruz is tropical and mountainous; the Pico de Orizaba, Mexico's tallest peak, is located there. The earthquake occurred during the rainy season, with heavy rain coming down before and after the event making search and rescue difficult. Ciudad Serdán is located in the rain shadow of the mountainous area and has a more arid climate.

== Past events ==
Mexico's southwest coast is much more seismically active than the southeast area near Orizaba. Earthquakes there have been relatively infrequent. The previous strong event in the region was on June 17, 1928, when a magnitude-7.8 event occurred south of Ciudad Serdán. However, the area 100 to 300 kilometers south of Ciudad Serdán does see more very strong earthquakes, with three events over magnitude 7 in 1928 alone.

== Damage ==
There was extensive damage, leaving hundreds dead and widespread devastation, in several cities in Puebla. The death toll was at least 600, with as many as 1,200 dead, and 212 casualties alone in the small Ciudad Serdán. Major cities affected were Ciudad Serdán, Orizaba, Ixtaczoquitlán, Córdoba, Ciudad Mendoza, Zongolica, Tlacotepec, Río Blanco, and Acultzingo.

In Orizaba, a twelve-story apartment building collapsed. Many of the occupants, up to 100, were sleeping at the time, and this was the number proclaimed dead at that site.

This event was the most disastrous earthquake in Puebla until the 1999 Tehuacán earthquake.

== See also ==
- List of earthquakes in 1973
- List of earthquakes in Mexico
