= 1932 Jalisco earthquakes =

Earthquakes in Mexico

- Location within Mexico
- UTC time: 1932-06-03 10:36:58
- 1932-06-18 10:12:32
- 1932-06-22 12:59:30
- ISC event: 906183
- 906234
- 906247
- USGS-ANSS: ComCat
- ComCat
- ComCat
- Local date: June 3, 1932
- June 18, 1932
- June 22, 1932
- Local time: 4:36:58 CST
- 4:12:32 CST
- 6:59:30 CST
- Duration: 95 seconds (first shock)
- Magnitude: 8.1 M_{w}
- 7.8 M_{w}
- 7.7 M_{w}
- Depth: 60 km (37 mi)
- 15 km (9 mi)
- 25 km (16 mi)
- Epicenter: 19.5°N 104.25°W
- Areas affected: Mexico; Guatemala
- Max. intensity: MMI X (Extreme)
- Tsunami: yes
- Casualties: 400+

The 1932 Jalisco earthquakes began on June 3 at 10:36 UTC with a megathrust event that registered 8.1 on the moment magnitude scale. With a maximum perceived intensity of X (Extreme) on the Mercalli intensity scale, at least 400 deaths were caused in Mexico and neighboring Guatemala. It was the first of a series of seismic events that affected parts of western Mexico during the month of June 1932, all reaching magnitude 7 or greater.

The Mexican subduction zone, the Middle America Trench, is seismically active and has generated both destructive and non-destructive tsunamis. Each earthquake in the series caused significant damage, injuries, and deaths, and in each case tsunamis of various heights were generated, with the June 22 catastrophic tsunami in Cuyutlán and San Blas being described as one of the most destructive events in the region based on all available historical records.

== Tectonic setting ==
This part of Mexico lies on a complex convergent boundary where the Rivera plate and the Cocos plate are being subducted beneath the North American plate. The transform boundary between the Rivera and Cocos plates is poorly defined. This earthquake is thought to have ruptured the south-easternmost segment of the interface involving the Rivera plate, although it may also have affected the north-westernmost part of the Cocos-North American plate interface.

The complex subduction zone off the coast of Colima and Jalisco experiences large recurring earthquakes. Prior events occurred in 1806, 1818, and 1900, and a recurrence period of 77 years was proposed for the region, but because of difficulty in positively identifying the rupture zones, this time frame was not precisely established. In 2003, near the same location, an earthquake with a magnitude of 7.6 claimed 29 lives.

== Earthquake ==
The mainshock was preceded by a series of small foreshocks. The rupture is thought to have initiated near Manzanillo, propagating to the northwest, although early reports from seismologists placed the epicenter farther southeast near the border of Oaxaca and Guerrero. The length of the rupture is estimated to be about 220 km. Seismometers located in New York, London, and Pasadena, California all measured the earthquake.

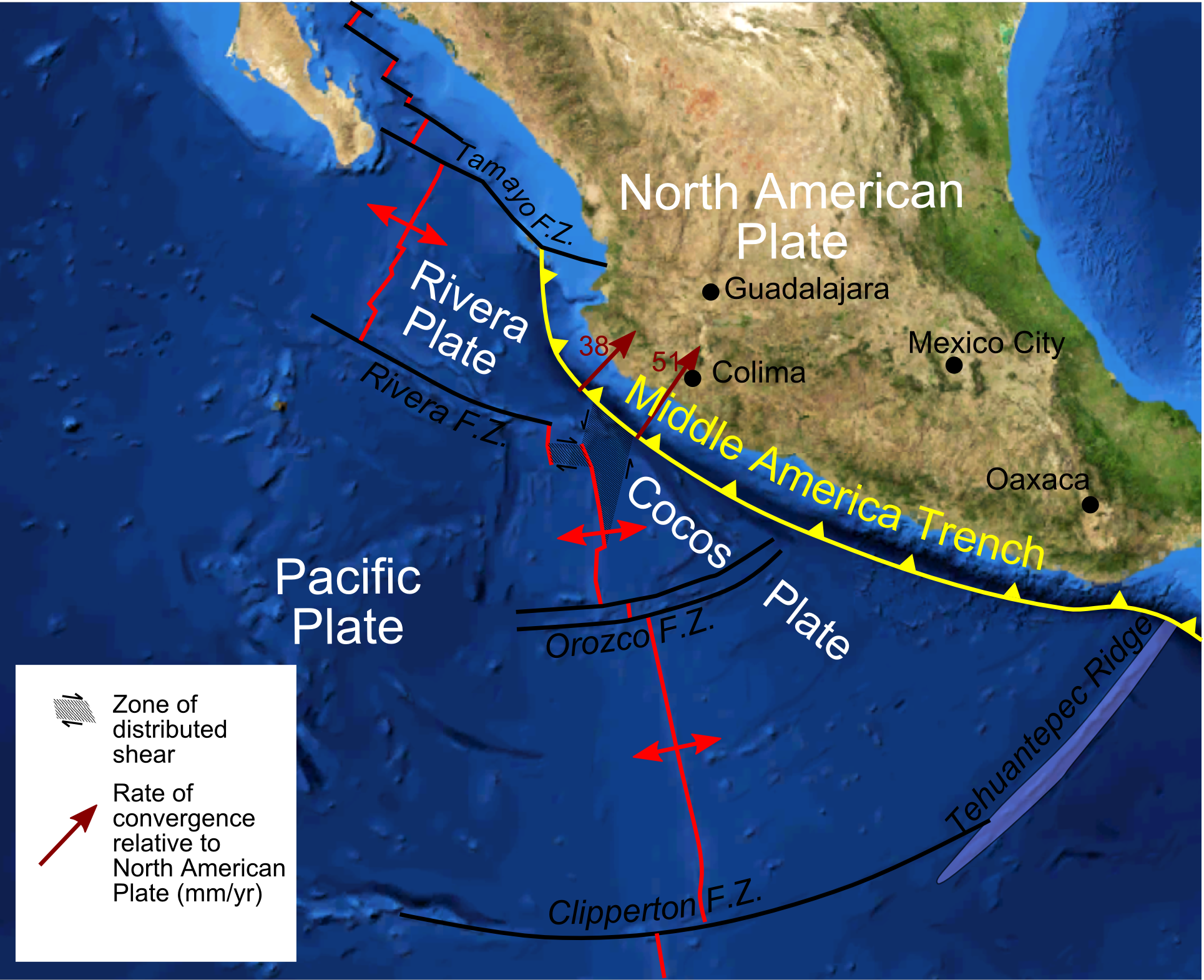
Plate boundaries in the Pacific, offshore western Mexico

Carlos Valdez, director of the National Seismology Center at the National Autonomous University of Mexico, called the earthquake the most powerful quake in modern Mexican history.

=== Sequence ===
The initial earthquake of June 3 off of the coast of Colima and Jalisco caused extensive damage along western Mexico, with much of the deaths and injuries concentrated in the area of Guadalajara. Early reporting from the Los Angeles Times noted that there were 300 deaths or injuries in that area alone.

Fifteen days after the first shock, June 18 at 4:12 am, there was a magnitude 7.8 event with an estimated rupture length of 60 kilometers (37 mi) and a duration of 22 seconds. Similar patterns of damage occurred as in the first quake. This time the human loss was centered around the city of Colima with 3 deaths and twelve injured, with heavy damage reported in Manzanillo. The low number of casualties may have been a result of many residents still sleeping outdoors since the previous quake. The Governor of Colima's home partially collapsed, though he escaped injury. The tsunami created from this event, reported to be 1 meter (3 ft 3 in) in height, was the smallest generated from the three June earthquakes.

The final and smallest event occurred on June 22 with a magnitude 7.7 earthquake. The event has been described as a tsunami earthquake due to an "anomalously slow source" and its larger-than-expected tsunami. A few minutes after the quake, there was a tsunami which resulted in the almost total destruction of the hotels and village homes in the city of Cuyutlán. The wave(s) were reported to be up to 10 meters (33 ft) in height. Up to 100 people were reported killed as the wave swept into the center of that small coastal village. The port city of Manzanillo also saw heavy damage again, but early reports via messenger did not indicate any deaths in that area. Both wired telegraph and radio communications were interrupted there. As Governor Saucedo gathered reports of inadequate care for those affected in Cuyutlán following the destructive wave, he appealed to the Red Cross to fill gaps where federal and state aid were proving ineffective. In the capital of Colima, where the residents were already recovering in their own neighborhoods, 2000 refugees were taken in from the wave swept coast.

=== Tsunami ===
The earthquake triggered a tsunami that had a maximum run-up height of 3 m at Bahia San Pedrito in Manzanillo. The tsunami was also recorded at Apia, San Diego, Hilo and Honolulu. Little damage was recorded from the tsunami other than the washing out of part of the railway line between Cuyutlán and Manzanillo and partial flooding of the port town of San Blas, Nayarit, but no deaths occurred there.

=== Damage ===
The earthquake caused significant damage and deaths in Colima, Ayotlán, Manzanillo, Cihuatlán, Zamora and Acatlán de Juárez. In Colima almost 3,000 houses were damaged. The sixteenth century Guadalajara Cathedral also sustained damage in the quake. Farther south in Mexico City several buildings toppled over and numerous cracks formed on the streets.

Following the quake there were no communications coming in from the city of Oaxaca. That city had suffered heavy damage the prior year in a magnitude 7.8 event, and there was initial concern that there had been a repeat event with a high death toll centered in that area.

== See also ==
- List of earthquakes in 1932
- List of earthquakes in Guatemala
- List of earthquakes in Mexico
