= Cuyutlán =

- Town
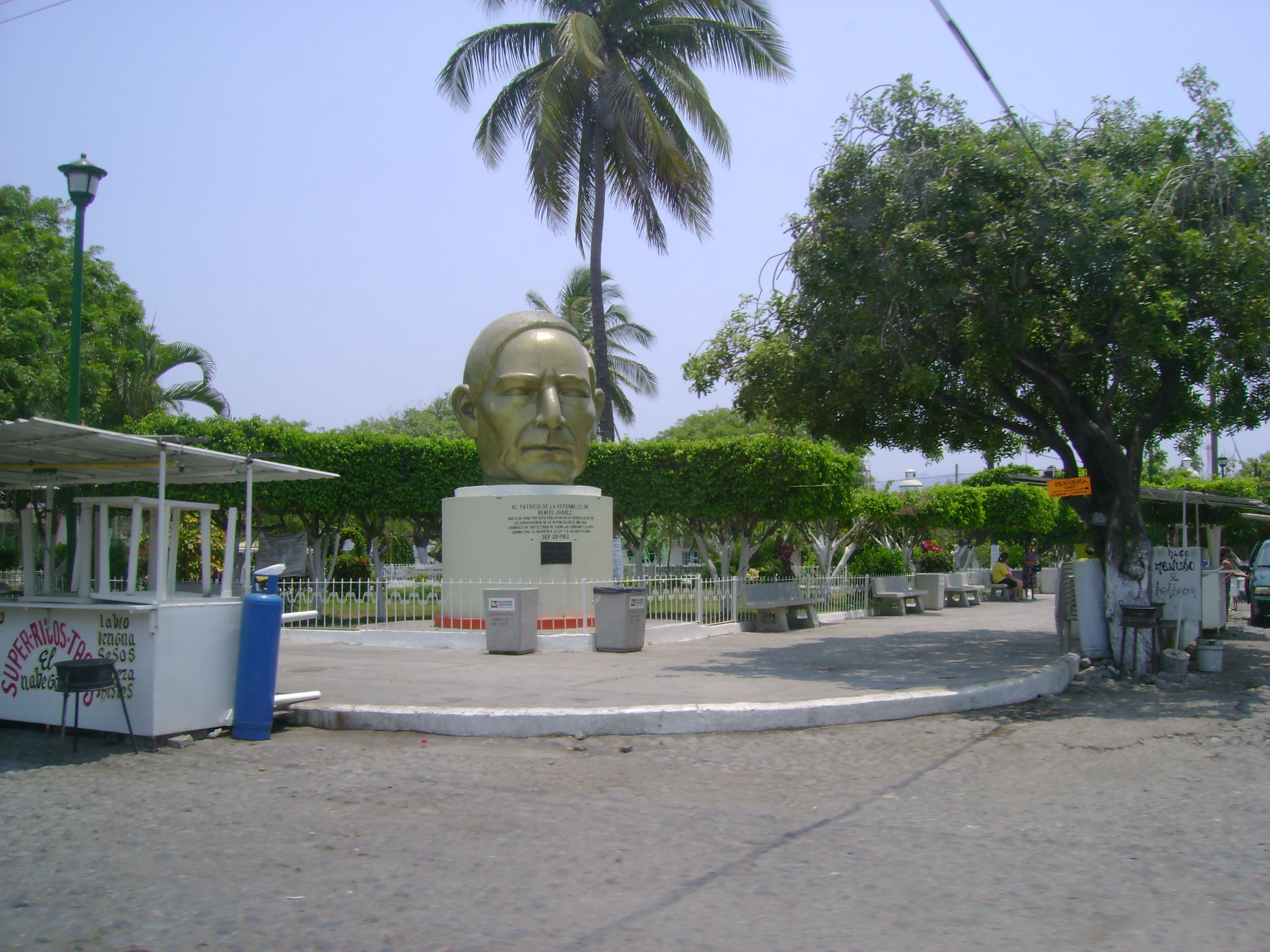
- Main square in Cuyutlán

- Location in Mexico
- Coordinates: 18°55′04″N 104°04′23″W
- Country: Mexico
- State: Colima
- Municipality: Armería
- Data source: INEGI
- Time zone: UTC-6 (CST)
  - Summer (DST): UTC-5 (CDT)
- Website: (in Spanish) Ayuntamiento de Armería

Cuyutlán is a town in the Mexican state of Colima, on the Pacific Ocean. Cuyutlán belongs to the municipality of Armería. There is also a Lagoon of Cuyutlán, which belongs to Armería and Manzanillo, the main Mexican harbour on the Pacific Ocean. Sea salt is produced there and has been since pre Columbian times. The process of salt mining can be viewed at the Museum of Salt (el Museo de la Sal).

Cuyutlán's El Paraiso Beach is home to a turtle sanctuary dedicated to protecting and conserving 3 species of turtles. These turtles come to Colima's coastline to lay eggs.

Possible construction of a chemical plant producing ammonium and urea was announced in Cuyutlán. Various local groups including Unidos por Cuyutlán and Sociedad Cooperativa de Salineros del Estado de Colima oppose the construction of the chemical plant.
