= 1973 Colima earthquake =

Earthquake in Mexico

- Location within Mexico
- UTC time: 1973-01-30 21:01:12
- ISC event: 765442
- USGS-ANSS: ComCat
- Local date: 30 January 1973
- Local time: 15:01 CT
- Duration: 2 minutes 40 seconds
- Magnitude: 7.6 M_{w}
- Depth: 35.3 km (21.9 mi)
- Epicenter: 18.489°N 102.886°W
- Fault: Middle America Trench
- Type: Thrust
- Areas affected: Mexico
- Max. intensity: MMI X (Extreme)
- Tsunami: Yes
- Aftershocks: Yes
- Casualties: 56 dead 390 injured

On January 30, 1973, at 15:01 (UTC–6), a magnitude 7.6 earthquake struck 35.3 km (21.9 mi) beneath the Sierra Madre del Sur range in the Mexican states of Colima, Jalisco and Michoacán. On the Mercalli intensity scale, the earthquake reached a maximum intensity of X (Extreme), causing serious damage in the region. At least 56 people were killed and about 390 were injured. The event is commonly referred to as the Colima earthquake.

== Tectonic setting ==
Off the west coast of Mexico is the Middle America Trench; a convergent plate boundary where the Cocos and Rivera plates subducts beneath the North American plate at a rate of ~6–9 cm/yr. The interface of this plate boundary is a huge thrust fault known as a megathrust which occasionally produces large megathrust earthquakes and tsunamis.

== Earthquake ==
The January 30 earthquake ruptured a shallow-angle section of the megathrust near a triple junction with the Rivera plate. Its location places it very close to the rupture patch of the 1941 earthquake. The depth of the event varies between seismological agencies and studies, from as shallow as 8 km (5.0 mi) to 43 km (27 mi). It is estimated that a 145 km (90 mi) by 85 km (53 mi) section of the subduction zone was involved in the rupture which propagated at a velocity of 2.7 km (1.7 mi)/s. The rupture occurred on the subduction interface at between 5 km (3.1 mi) and 27 km (17 mi) depth. Prior to the earthquake, that section of the subduction zone was designated a seismic gap which has not experience any earthquakes in recent memory. The 1985 Mexico City earthquake rupture would overlap that of the 1973 quake 12 years later.

Around 330 aftershocks were recorded over a two-and-a-half week period following the deployment of seismographs four days after the mainshock. The largest aftershock measured magnitude 6.2. Most of the aftershocks measured 1.5–4.5 on the local magnitude scale with focal depths of 2–30 km (1.2–18.6 mi).

=== Tsunami ===
A moderate tsunami with amplitudes of 0.40–1.16 m (1 ft 4 in – 3 ft 10 in) was observed along the Mexican coast. Tidal gauges in Hawaii also recorded the tsunami at 0.21 m (8.3 in).

== Impact ==
The earthquake was powerful enough to be felt across the country to the Gulf of Mexico. Severe shaking and heavy damage were limited to the states of Colima, Jalisco and Michoacán. Fifty six people died and 390 were injured by this event. Tecomán and Coahuayana suffered significant damage from the violent ground motions. Landslides and ground fissures were discovered along the relatively unpopulated coasts of Michoacán. Water, electricity and telephone lines were cut throughout.

An elementary school in Manzanillo, Colima sustained significant structural damage after the quake. The school building rocked so violently that many eyewitnesses thought the structure would collapse. Damage was so severe that the building was determined unsafe for use and demolished. In another part of the city, an obelisk partially collapsed, with only three quarters of the structure remaining. A highway which connected Manzanillo with Salagua and Santiago in Colima suffered major damage including large fissures which opened in the asphalt.

In Mexico City, the earthquake was felt strongly in the north and western part of the city for at least 40 seconds. It caused mass hysteria and light damage to high-rise buildings.

== See also ==
- List of earthquakes in Mexico
- List of earthquakes in 1973
