= Port of Manzanillo =

Seaport in Manzanillo, Colima, Mexico

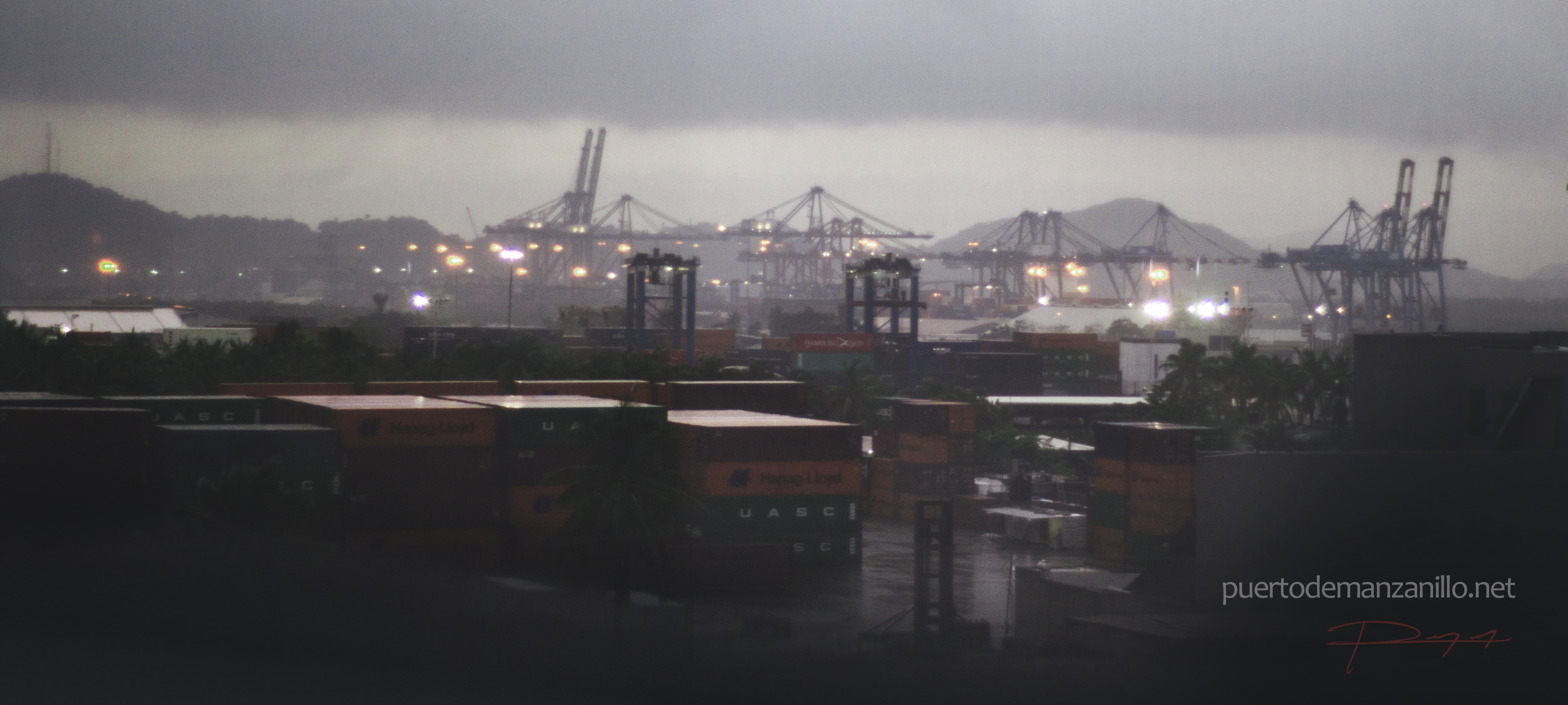
- Interactive map of Port of Manzanillo
- Location within Mexico

Location
- Location: Mexico
- Coordinates: 19°03′N 104°19′W
- UN/LOCODE: MXPMD

Details
- No. of berths: 27
- Draft depth: 16.0 metres (52.5 ft)

Statistics
- Website; Official website

The Port of Manzanillo is a seaport located in Manzanillo, Colima, Mexico. This port is one of the busiest ports in Mexico, responsible for handling Pacific Ocean cargo for the Mexico City area.

== History ==
The modern port of Manzanillo was established in 1971. Previously, the administration of the port of Manzanillo was problematic. There was a poor relationship between the workers and the previous administration. The government of Mexico created the National Commission for Port Coordination which was in charge of organizing the workers assignments, checking that work was done on time. They were also in charge of obtaining port equipment, in order to increase handling speeds in the port. Over the last 40 years, the Port of Manzanillo has improved, increasing the productivity and has made the delivery process faster and more efficient.

== Geography and economic impact ==
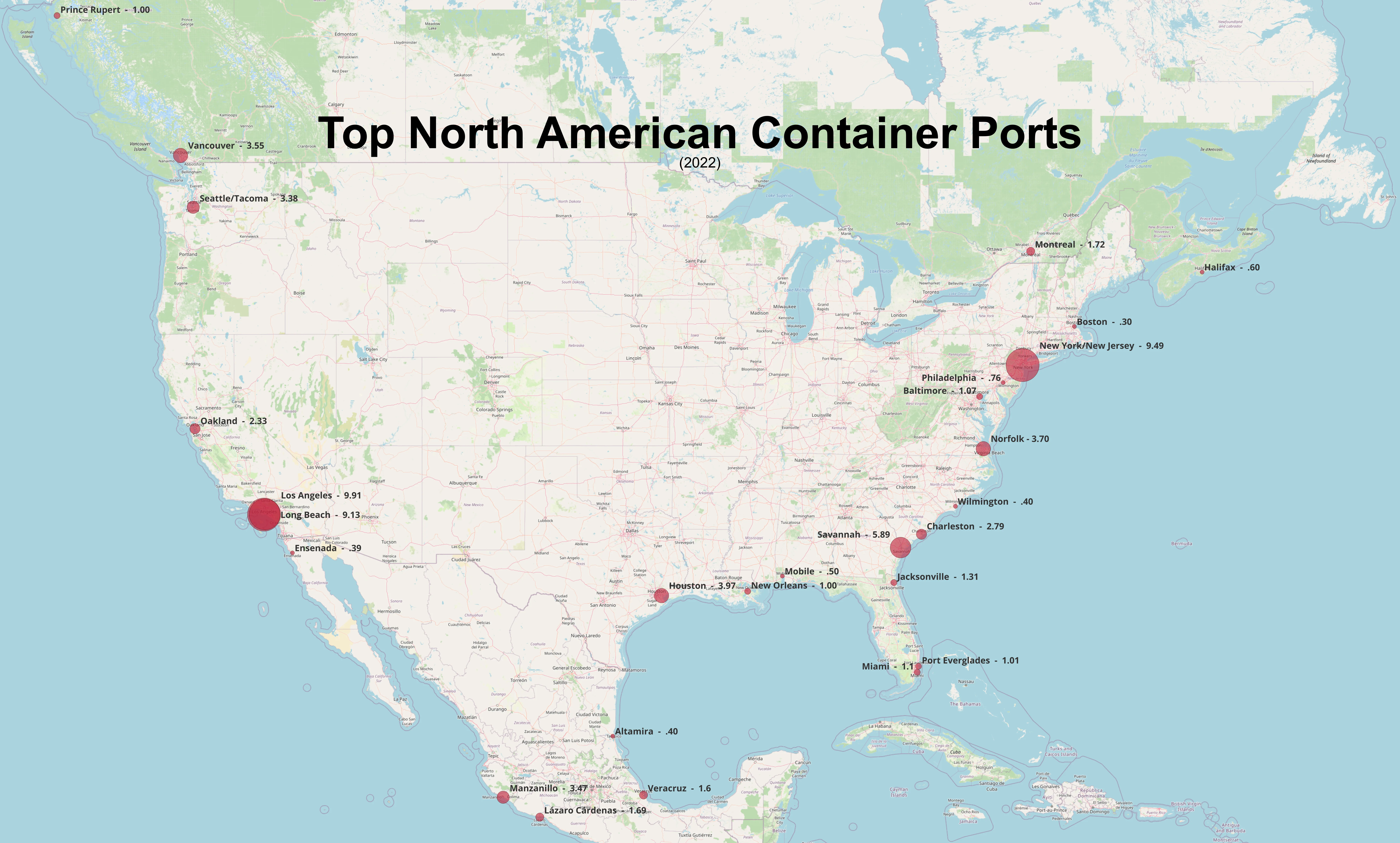
North American container ports

The port of Manzanillo is located in the state of Colima on the west coast of Mexico. Nowadays, the port is one of the most secure in Mexico. According to the Mexican Secretariat of Economy, the port has attracted the most foreign and domestic private investment in the country.

The port of Manzanillo is the principal entrance for the handling of imports destined for of the center of the country. On the west coast, this port is considered as the main entrance of container shipping. On July 5, 2016, the full port administration of Manzanillo received the shippings award, given by the Federal Counsel for Environmental Protection. This award is the first one that the Award Council gave to a Mexican port.

== Operations ==
The main imports handled by the port include general consumer goods such as wax, steel products and spare parts. Agricultural products include wheat, sorghum, oat and fertilizer; the minerals include sulfur, zinc concentrate, cast and potassium nitrate. Most exports from this port go to countries such as United States, Canada, Guatemala, Colombia, Chile, Japan, China, India, Malaysia, and Singapore. Other important countries include Spain, Russia, and Germany.

As it is located in the pacific coast, the port of Manzanillo has very important Asians exporters and importers. The principal exports are beer, cars, cement, sugar, copper, steel tubes, carbon, glucose and resin. In addition, the port provides repackaging service for products such as clothes, shoes, tequila, chemical products and milk powder.
