= 1964 Baihe earthquake =

Earthquake in Taiwan

- Location within Taiwan
- UTC time: 1964-01-18 12:04:44
- ISC event: 871334
- USGS-ANSS: ComCat
- Local date: January 18, 1964
- Local time: 20:04 CST
- Magnitude: 6.3 M_{L}
- Depth: 20.0 km (12.4 mi)
- Epicenter: 23.1°N 120.5°E
- Areas affected: Baihe, Tainan, Taiwan
- Casualties: 106 killed, 650 injured (229 serious)

The 1964 Baihe earthquake (Chinese: 1964年白河大地震; pinyin: 1964 nián Báihé dà dìzhèn), also known as the Great Baihe earthquake, measured 6.3 local magnitude, and occurred at 20:04 CST (UTC+8) on 18 January in Baihe Township of Tainan County (now part of Tainan City), Taiwan. The hypocenter of the earthquake was 20 kilometers deep. The earthquake killed 106 people, destroyed 10,924 buildings, and caused a great fire in Chiayi City. It was the sixth deadliest earthquake in 20th century Taiwan, and the third deadliest post-World War II, after the 1999 Jiji earthquake and the 2016 Taiwan earthquake.

== Earthquake ==
The earthquake struck at 20:05 on Saturday 18 January 1964, affecting the heavily populated Chiayi-Tainan plain (Chianan Plain) area of central-southern Taiwan. The epicentre was near the town of Baihe, in northeastern Tainan County and at a focal depth of 20 km. It was the most serious historical quake resulting from a rupture in the Chukou Fault (Chinese: 觸口斷層; pinyin: Chùkǒu duàncéng).

== Damage ==
According to Taiwan's Central Weather Bureau, the casualties and damage were as follows:

- 106 dead
- 229 seriously injured
- 421 lightly injured
- 10,502 dwellings completely destroyed
- 25,818 dwellings partially destroyed
- 682 public buildings destroyed
- 764 public buildings partially destroyed

The cost of repairing the damage to public buildings in Tainan County alone was estimated at NT$191 million (in 1964 New Taiwan Dollars).

The effects of the quake depended on the ground on which buildings stood. On the softer ground of Baihe and Dongshan, Tainan, concrete structures fared better than wooden ones, whereas on the harder earth of Nansi and Yujing the reverse was true, with concrete buildings suffering more damage.

In Chiayi City the damage from the earthquake was not so severe, however there was some damage, mainly to older, structurally weak wooden houses. The main cause of disaster in Chiayi was the fire that resulted from the quake. Aftershocks meant that residents and firefighters feared to approach the blaze to tackle it, thus letting it spread until it consumed 174 households in central Chiayi.

== Response ==
There was no official disaster management policy in effect in Taiwan at the time – relief and reconstruction was carried out on an ad hoc basis by the military and police forces. The earthquake forced a rethink of this lack, and the following year the Standard Procedure for Natural Disaster Assistance was promulgated by the Taiwan Provincial Government.

== See also ==
- List of earthquakes in 1964
- List of earthquakes in Taiwan
- 2016 southern Taiwan earthquake
- 2025 Tainan–Chiayi earthquake
