= 2025 Tainan–Chiayi earthquake =

Damaging earthquake centered in Tainan City, Taiwan

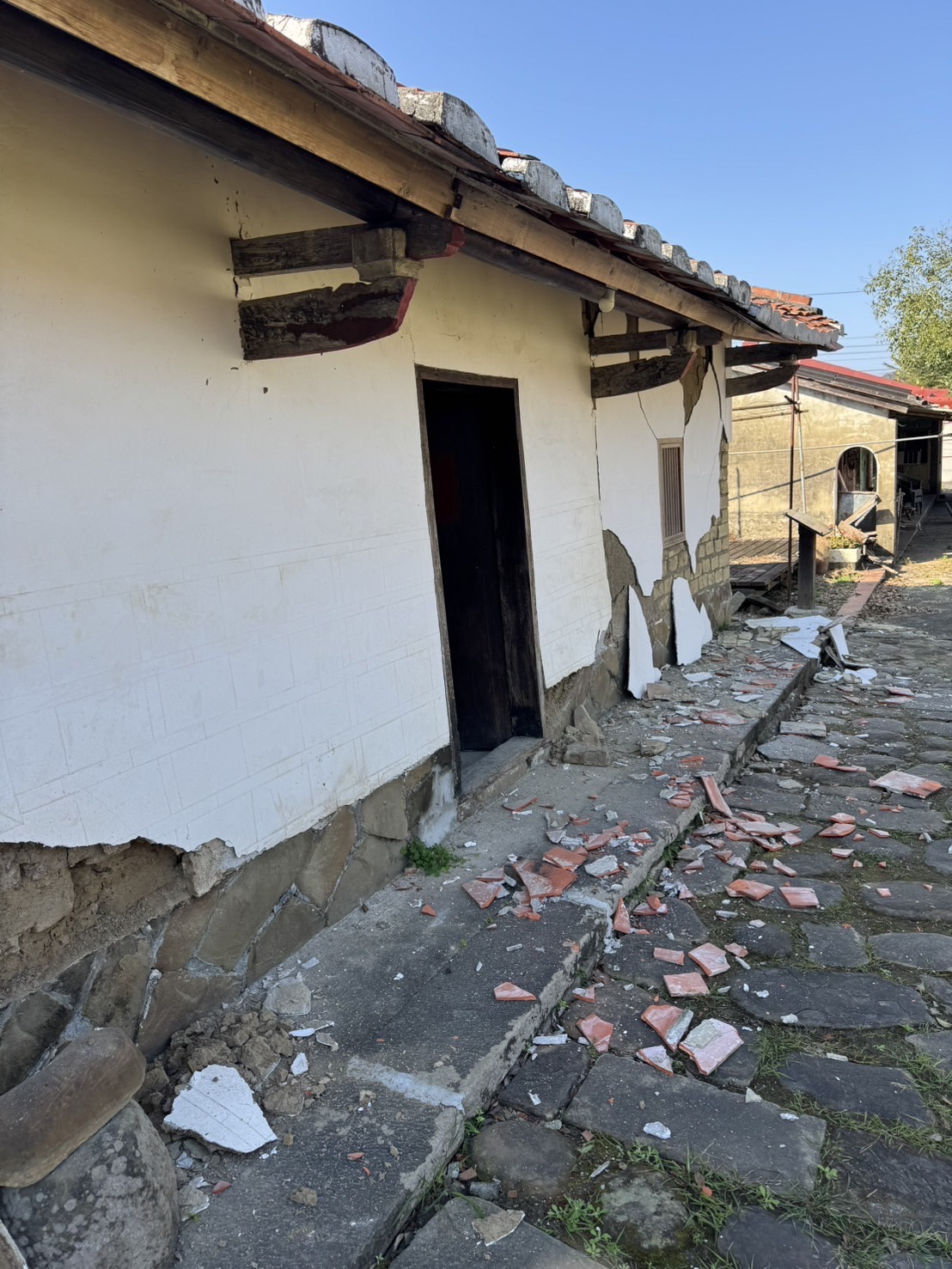
- Damage to a home in Tainan

- Location within Taiwan
- UTC time: 2025-01-20 16:17:26
- ISC event: 642740310
- USGS-ANSS: ComCat
- Local date: 21 January 2025
- Local time: 00:17:26 TST (UTC+8)
- Magnitude: M_{L} 6.4; M_{w} 6.0
- Depth: 16 km (9.9 mi)
- Epicenter: 23.168°N 120.547°E
- Type: Reverse
- Areas affected: Tainan, Yunlin, Chiayi, Chiayi City, Kaohsiung and Taitung Counties, Taiwan
- Total damage: NT$5.3 billion (US$162 million)
- Max. intensity: CWA 6− (MMI VI)
- Peak acceleration: 2,104.96 gal (2.15 g)
- Peak velocity: 75.68 cm/s
- Landslides: Yes
- Aftershocks: 134+ (as of 30/01/2025); Strongest: 2 M_{L} 5.7 events on 25 & 26 January
- Casualties: 50 injuries

On 21 January 2025, at 00:17:26 TST (16:17 UTC on 20 January), a M_{L} 6.4 (M_{w} 6.0) earthquake struck Dongshan District, Tainan City, Taiwan, near the border with Chiayi County. It was caused by reverse faulting and had a depth of 16 kilometres (9.9 miles). It injured 50 people and damaged several thousand buildings across six counties and cities in the southwest of the island, mainly in Tainan. The earthquake was followed by a series of intense aftershocks, which caused additional damage in the most badly affected areas of the mainshock.

== Tectonic setting ==
Taiwan has a history of strong earthquakes. The island is located within a complex zone of convergence between the Philippine Sea plate and Eurasian plate. At the location of the earthquake, these plates converge at a rate of 75 millimetres (3.0 in) per year. To the south of Taiwan, oceanic crust of the Eurasian plate is subducting beneath the Philippine Sea plate creating an island arc, the Luzon Arc. At Taiwan, the oceanic crust has all been subducted and the arc is colliding with continental crust of the Eurasian plate. To the north of Taiwan, the Philippine Sea plate is in contrast subducting beneath the Eurasian plate, forming the Ryukyu Arc.

== Earthquake ==
USGS Shakemap

The United States Geological Survey (USGS) noted that the earthquake measured a moment magnitude (M_{w}) of 6.0, while Taiwan's Central Weather Administration (CWB) measured it at M_{L} 6.4. The epicenter was located in Dongshan District, Tainan City, near the border with Dapu, Chiayi County, 12 km (7.5 mi) north of Yujing and 38 km (24 mi) northeast of Tainan's city center. It was reportedly the most powerful earthquake to strike the Tainan-Chiayi area since the 1964 Baihe earthquake, and the first large earthquake in the region since 1998.

The CWB's earthquake early warning system issued a warning at 00:17:33.9 local time; 7.9 seconds after the initial detection of seismic waves from the mainshock, with the warning covering the entirety of Taiwan. The CWB then provided the observed seismic intensities of affected towns and counties at 00:20:42, and publicly reported the quake at 00:24:29. The earthquake had a maximum CWA seismic intensity of 6- in Chiayi County, 5- in Tainan and Kaoshiung, and 4 in Yunlin, Taitung, Nantou, Pingtung, Hualien, Changhua, Taichung and Penghu Counties, as well as in Chiayi City. At Dapu, Chiayi, a maximum peak ground acceleration of 2,104.96 gal (2.15 g) was recorded by a CWB station.

By 30 January, 134 aftershocks were recorded by the CWB, including 38 which were felt widely. A M_{w} 5.1 event struck near Yujing at 02:26 local time, followed by another aftershock measuring M_{L} 5.7 (M_{w} 5.1) on 25 January. The next day, another aftershock, also measuring M_{L} 5.7 (M_{w} 5.2), occurred. Another M_{L} 5.6 (M_{w} 5.1) event hit the area on 30 January.

== Impact ==
=== Mainshock ===
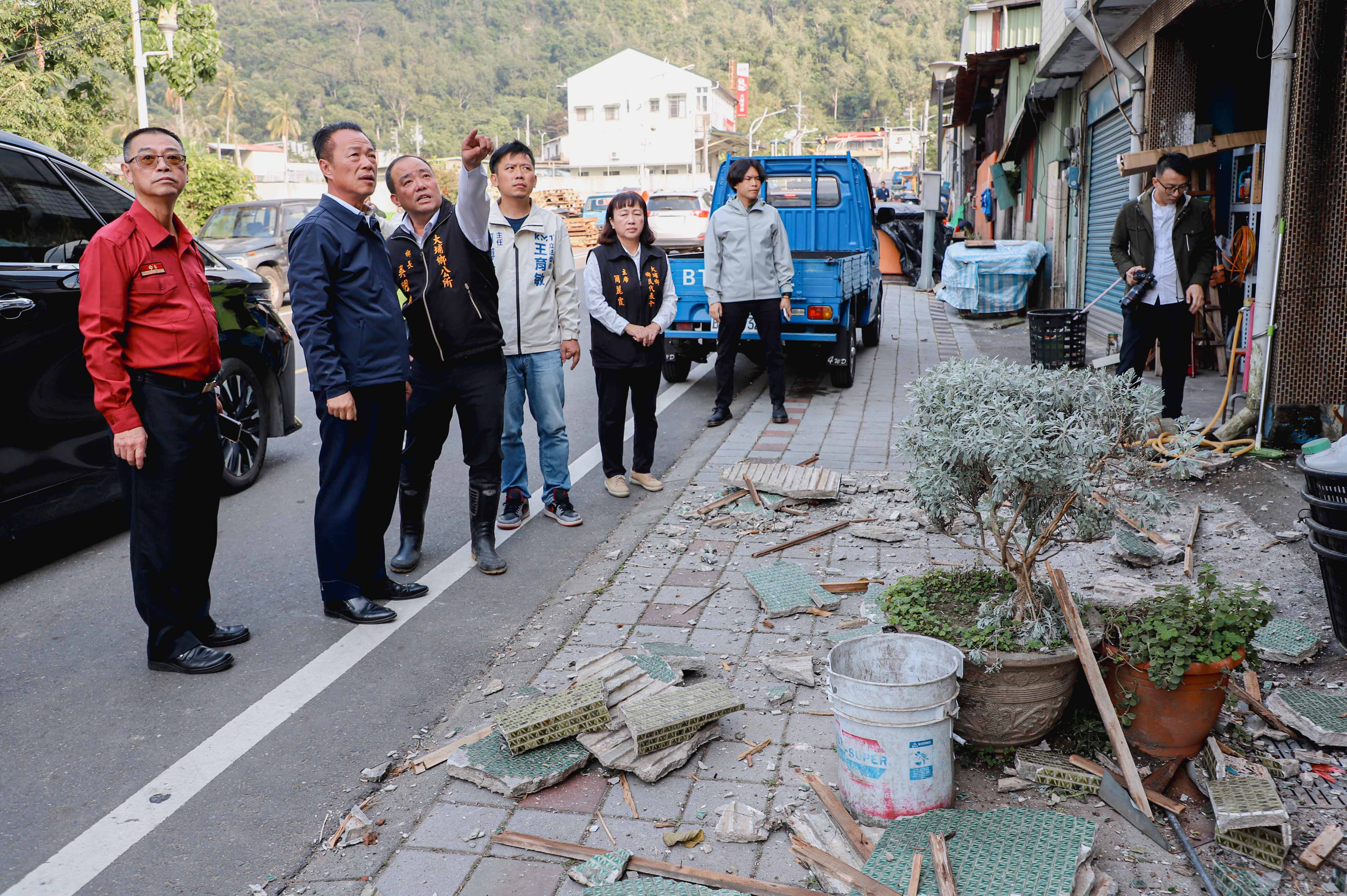
People assessing earthquake damage in Chiayi

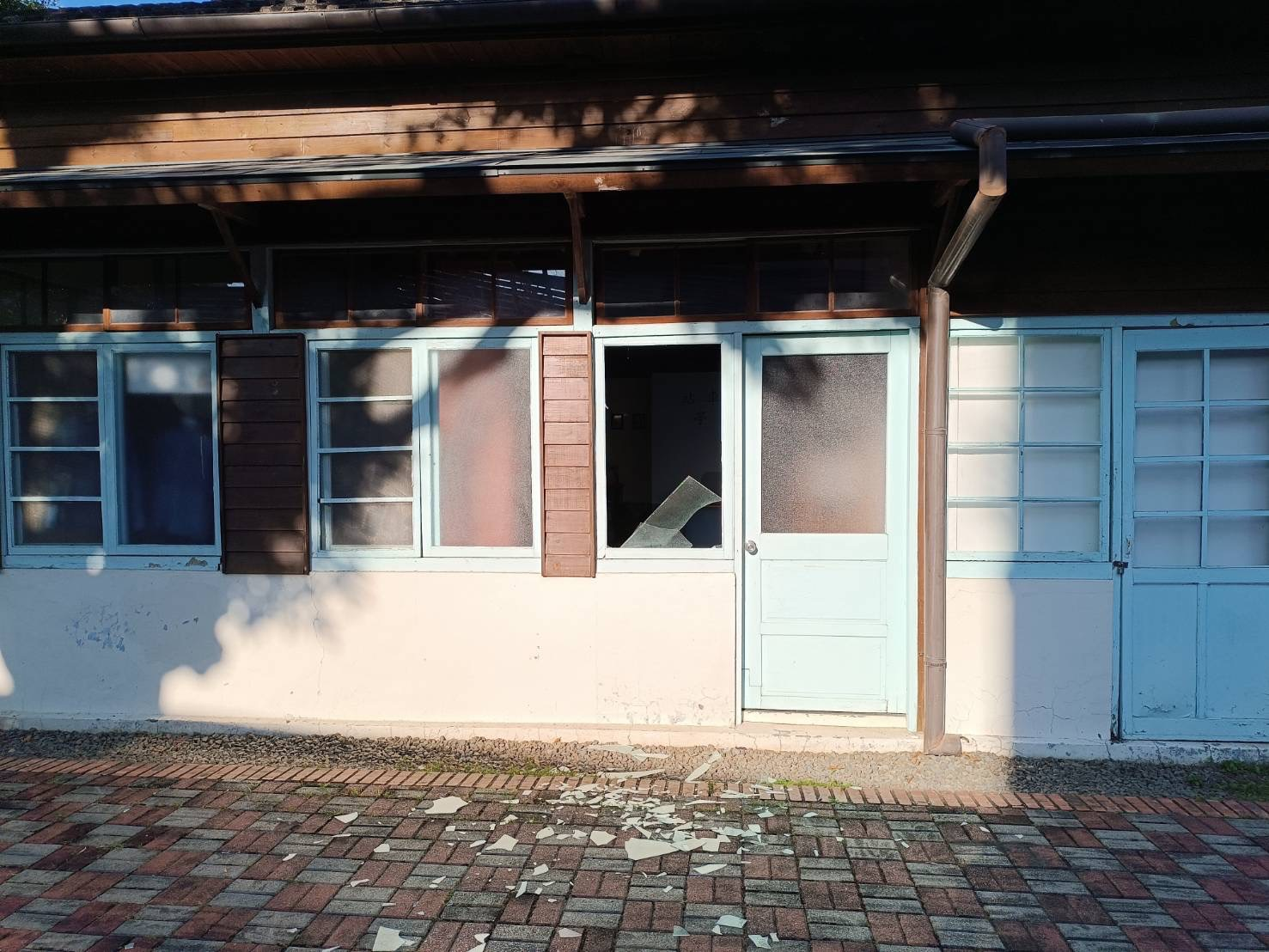
Window damage caused by aftershocks in Tainan

The earthquake injured at least 50 people, including 29 in Tainan, 8 in Kaoshiung, 7 in Chiayi City, 4 in Yunlin and 2 in Chiayi County. Power and water outages affected 36,342 households, including 22,074 in Tainan, 6,923 in Kaoshiung and 3,975 in Chiayi, although electricity was quickly restored. In Tainan City, 4,291 homes were affected with varying degrees of damage, including 477 which were badly damaged or destroyed and 1,333 others with moderate damage; the number of households with moderate or severe damage more than doubled that of the 2016 southern Taiwan earthquake. At least 1,710 homes suffered damage in Nansi, 892 in Yujing and 117 in Dongshan. Several homes in the county collapsed completely. At least 405 schools were also damaged, nearly all of them in Tainan and Chiayi, resulting in losses of NT$196.88 million (US$6 million); overall economic losses from the earthquake amounted to NT$5.3 billion (US$162 million).

Six people, including a one-month-old baby, were rescued from a collapsed house, while three others stuck in elevators were also rescued. The Zhuwei Bridge in Yujing District along Provincial Highway 3 also suffered damage. A wall collapsed, some roads were badly affected, 130 buildings were seriously damaged and rockfalls occurred in Dapu, Chiayi. The village of Xixing was cut off due to landslides blocking access roads, leaving 50 residents stranded. In Lucao, the wall of a house fell. The parapet of a house also collapsed in Kaohsiung. A landslide blocked a section of the Southern Cross-Island Highway near Haiduan, Taitung. A fire broke out at a printing factory in Chiayi. TSMC temporarily suspended operations in facilities across central and southern Taiwan and evacuated employees.

=== Aftershocks ===
A M_{L} 5.7 aftershock on 25 January caused wall collapses at Dongyuan Junior High School and multiple residential buildings in Dongshan District, were power outages were reported. Rockfalls also reportedly blocked roads in the district. One person was injured after suffering a fall and another had to be rescued in Nansi. A second M_{L} 5.7 aftershock the following day caused a house to collapse in Nansi, damaged 10 houses in Dongshan and resulted in power outages at Yujing. Two high-speed trains were forced to stop in Chiayi and Tainan. On 30 January, a M_{L} 5.6 aftershock caused part of the façade of Tainan's city hall to collapse, damaging two vehicles below.

== Aftermath and response ==
Due to fear of aftershocks, many residents in Nansi slept outside, and over a hundred residents displaced by the earthquake were resettled at a local inn. The Tainan City Government announced that the first wave of earthquake relief funds would be distributed to more than 3,700 residents before Chinese New Year to residents whose homes were severely damaged or destroyed. Following the quake, four shelters in Tainan were opened to 68 victims. Both Premier Cho Jung-tai and President Lai Ching-te visited Tainan and pledged government support.

== See also ==
- List of earthquakes in 2025
- List of earthquakes in Taiwan
- 1906 Meishan earthquake
- 2010 Kaohsiung earthquake
- 2024 Hualien earthquake
