= Kaohsiung earthquake =

Kaohsiung earthquake may refer to:

- 2010 Kaohsiung earthquake

== See also ==
- 2016 southern Taiwan earthquake
- List of earthquakes in Taiwan
