= TAEA =

TAEA may refer to:

- Tainan Astronomical Education Area, an educational center in Taiwan
- Tris(2-aminoethyl)amine, an organic compound

== See also ==
- Asteroid 281569 Taea, named after the educational center
