= Nansi =

Nansi can refer to:

- Nansi Lake, lake in Shandong Province in China
- Nansi Richards (1888–1979), Welsh harpist
- Nansi District, sometimes spelled Nanxi, a district in Tainan, Taiwan
- Nansi Nevins, singer in Sweetwater (band)
- Nansi, a variant spelling of mythological spider Anansi
