= List of earthquakes in 1963 =

Earthquakes in 1963
Approximate epicenters of the earthquakes in 1963
- 4.0–5.9 magnitude
- 6.0–6.9 magnitude
- 7.0–7.9 magnitude
- 8.0+ magnitude
- Strongest: Soviet Union, Kuril Islands, Russia (Magnitude 8.5) October 13
- Deadliest: Yugoslavia, Skopje, Socialist Republic of Macedonia (Magnitude 6.0) July 26 1,070 deaths
- Total fatalities: 1,488

Number by magnitude
- 9.0+: 0

This is a list of earthquakes in 1963. Only magnitude 6.0 or greater earthquakes appear on the list. Lower magnitude events are included if they have caused death, injury or damage. Events which occurred in remote areas will be excluded from the list as they wouldn't have generated significant media interest. All dates are listed according to UTC time. Maximum intensities are indicated on the Mercalli intensity scale and are sourced from United States Geological Survey (USGS) ShakeMap data. A fairly active year with 17 events reaching above magnitude 7.0. The intensity of the events was stronger with 2 measuring above magnitude 8. Both events came within 3 weeks of each other. The strongest of 1963 was in the Kuril Islands, Russia and was magnitude 8.5. Macedonia had by far the most of the 1,488 fatalities. A fairly modest magnitude 6.0 event in July resulted in 1,070 deaths and substantial destruction. Libya had one of the worst events in its history in February. Again a fairly moderate magnitude 5.6 ended up with 300 deaths in the area.

== Overall ==
=== By death toll ===
Rank	Death toll	Magnitude	Location	MMI	Depth (km)	Date
1	1,070	6.0	Yugoslavia, Skopje, Macedonia	X (Extreme)	15.0	July 26
2	375	5.6	Kingdom of Libya, Marj District	VI (Strong)	25.0	February 21
3	100	6.0	Iran, Kermanshah Province	VII (Very strong)	20.0	March 24
4	15	7.2	Taiwan, off the east coast of Taiwan	VII (Very strong)	30.0	February 13

- Note: At least 10 casualties

=== By magnitude ===
Rank	Magnitude	Death toll	Location	MMI	Depth (km)	Date
1	8.5	0	Soviet Union, Kuril Islands, Russia	IX (Violent)	35.0	October 13
2	8.1	0	Indonesia, Banda Sea	VIII (Severe)	65.0	November 4
3	7.8	0	Soviet Union, Kuril Islands, Russia	VI (Strong)	28.2	October 20
4	7.7	0	Peru, Puno Region	IV (Light)	550.0	August 15
= 5	7.6	0	Brazil, Acre (state)	I (Not felt)	590.7	November 9
= 5	7.6	0	United Kingdom, south of Fiji	VIII (Severe)	55.0	December 18
6	7.5	0	Australia, Morobe Province, Papua and New Guinea	VI (Strong)	186.6	February 26
7	7.4	0	United Kingdom, Santa Cruz Islands, Solomon Islands	IX (Violent)	35.0	September 15
8	7.3	0	New Zealand, Kermadec Islands	I (Not felt)	10.0	March 26
= 9	7.2	15	Taiwan, off the east coast of Taiwan	VII (Very strong)	30.0	February 13
= 9	7.2	0	Soviet Union, east of the Kuril Islands, Russia	I (Not felt)	15.0	March 16
= 9	7.2	0	United Kingdom Santa Cruz Islands, Solomon Islands	VIII (Severe)	45.0	September 17
= 10	7.1	0	Indonesia, south of Halmahera	VII (Very strong)	30.0	April 16
= 10	7.1	0	Indonesia, south of Halmahera	I (Not felt)	30.0	April 16
= 11	7.0	0	United Kingdom Fiji	III (Weak)	570.0	August 25
= 11	7.0	0	Soviet Union, Kuril Islands, Russia	V (Moderate)	37.5	October 12
= 11	7.0	0	Indonesia, Java Sea	I (Not felt)	661.5	December 15

- Note: At least 7.0 magnitude

== Notable events ==
=== January ===
January
- Strongest: 6.7 M_{w} Japan
- Total fatalities: 0

Number by magnitude
- 8.0–8.9: 0
- 7.0–7.9: 0
- 6.0–6.9: 7

Date	Country and location	M_{w}	Depth (km)	MMI	Notes	Casualties	
Date	Country and location	M_{w}	Depth (km)	MMI	Notes	Dead	Injured
1	United States, south of Alaska Peninsula	6.4	74.8				
2	Indonesia, Papua (province)	6.0	25.0	VI			
5	Indonesia, West Timor	6.0	35.0	VI			
24	Philippines, off the east coast of Mindanao	6.0	50.0	IV			
28	Australia, west of New Hanover Island, Papua and New Guinea	6.5	35.0	VI			
28	United States, south of Alaska Peninsula	6.6	35.0	V			
31	Japan, northwest of Ryukyu Islands	6.7	50.0				

=== February ===
February
- Strongest: 7.5 M_{w} Australia
- Deadliest: 5.6 M_{w} Kingdom of Libya; 300 deaths
- Total fatalities: 315

Number by magnitude
- 8.0–8.9: 0
- 7.0–7.9: 2
- 6.0–6.9: 6
- 5.0–5.9: 1

Date	Country and location	M_{w}	Depth (km)	MMI	Notes	Casualties	
Date	Country and location	M_{w}	Depth (km)	MMI	Notes	Dead	Injured
5	Chile, Araucanía Region	6.4	25.0	VII			
6	Chile, Araucanía Region	6.0	25.0	VI	Aftershock.		
13	Taiwan, off the east coast of	7.2	30.0	VII	The 1963 Su-ao earthquake left 15 people dead and another 18 were injured. Some homes were destroyed.	15	18
13	United Kingdom, Solomon Islands	6.4	20.0	VI			
14	Indonesia, Barat Daya Islands	6.6	220.0	IV			
14	Australia, Madang Province, Papua and New Guinea	6.1	64.7	VI			
21	Kingdom of Libya, Marj District	5.6	25.0	VI	300 people were killed and a further 375 were injured in the 1963 Marj earthquake. Many homes were damaged or destroyed. Costs reached $5 million (1963 rate).	300	375
26	Australia, Morobe Province, Papua and New Guinea	7.5	186.6	VI			
27	Australia, West New Britain Province, Papua and New Guinea	6.7	35.0	VI			

=== March ===
March
- Strongest: 7.3 M_{w} New Zealand
- Deadliest: 6.0 M_{w} Iran; 100 deaths
- Total fatalities: 100

Number by magnitude
- 8.0–8.9: 0
- 7.0–7.9: 2
- 6.0–6.9: 10

Date	Country and location	M_{w}	Depth (km)	MMI	Notes	Casualties	
Date	Country and location	M_{w}	Depth (km)	MMI	Notes	Dead	Injured
4	Taiwan, off the east coast	6.3	20.0	VI			
4	Peru, off the north coast	6.1	15.0	V			
10	Taiwan, off the east coast	6.1	15.0	V	Aftershock.		
16	Soviet Union, east of the Kuril Islands, Russia	7.2	15.0				
24	Indonesia, northeast of Sumba	6.3	20.0	VI			
24	Iran, Kermanshah Province	6.0	20.0	VII	100 people were killed and major damage was caused.	100	
26	New Zealand, Kermadec Islands	7.3	10.0				
26	New Zealand, Kermadec Islands	6.5	15.0		Aftershock.		
26	Japan, off the west coast of Honshu	6.3	15.0	VI			
28	Iceland, off the north coast of	6.9	10.0	VII			
31	New Zealand, Kermadec Islands	6.6	35.0		Aftershock.		
31	Australia, West New Britain Province, Papua and New Guinea	6.1	35.0	V			

=== April ===
April
- Strongest: 7.1 M_{w} Indonesia two events
- Total fatalities: 0

Number by magnitude
- 8.0–8.9: 0
- 7.0–7.9: 2
- 6.0–6.9: 7
- 5.0–5.9: 1

Date	Country and location	M_{w}	Depth (km)	MMI	Notes	Casualties	
Date	Country and location	M_{w}	Depth (km)	MMI	Notes	Dead	Injured
7	Indonesia, off the west coast of Sumatra	6.1	59.4	V			
10	Indonesia, Timor	6.0	70.0	V			
13	Peru, San Martin Region	6.5	119.8	V			
13	Indonesia, Papua (province)	6.1	46.9	VI			
16	Indonesia, south of Halmahera	7.1	30.0	rowspan="2"| Doublet earthquake.			
16	Indonesia, south of Halmahera	7.1	30.0	VI			
19	China, southern Qinghai Province	6.7	20.0	VIII	A few homes were damaged or destroyed.		
23	China, Yunnan Province	5.8	30.0	VII	Some homes were destroyed.		
27	Indonesia, Halmahera	6.0	28.8	VI	Aftershock.		
30	Indonesia, southeast of Halmahera	6.3	60.0	V	Aftershock.		

=== May ===
May
- Strongest: 6.9 M_{w} Soviet Union
- Total fatalities: 0

Number by magnitude
- 8.0–8.9: 0
- 7.0–7.9: 0
- 6.0–6.9: 9
- 5.0–5.9: 1

Date	Country and location	M_{w}	Depth (km)	MMI	Notes	Casualties	
Date	Country and location	M_{w}	Depth (km)	MMI	Notes	Dead	Injured
1	New Hebrides, Vanuatu	6.8	142.9	VI			
8	Japan, off the east coast of Honshu	6.2	46.5	V			
9	Nicaragua, León Department	5.6	50.0	V	Some damage was caused.		
10	Ecuador, Morona-Santiago Province	6.6	20.0	VI			
12	United States, Kodiak Island, Alaska	6.0	36.6	IV			
18	Argentina, San Juan Province, Argentina	6.0	15.0	VII			
19	Chile, Aysén Region	6.4	15.0	VII			
20	New Zealand, Kermadec Islands	6.8	65.0				
22	Soviet Union, Kuril Islands, Russia	6.9	30.0				
26	Soviet Union, Kamchatka, Russia	6.1	30.0	VI			

=== June ===
June
- Strongest: 6.9 M_{w} Soviet Union
- Total fatalities: 0

Number by magnitude
- 8.0–8.9: 0
- 7.0–7.9: 0
- 6.0–6.9: 6
- 5.0–5.9: 1

Date	Country and location	M_{w}	Depth (km)	MMI	Notes	Casualties	
Date	Country and location	M_{w}	Depth (km)	MMI	Notes	Dead	Injured
4	Indonesia, south of Halmahera	6.1	30.0	VI			
7	Tonga	6.0	20.0				
19	Indonesia, Talaud Islands	6.1	65.0	V			
21	China, Heilongjiang Province	5.9	35.0	VII	Some damage was reported.		
24	United States, Cook Inlet, Alaska	6.3	45.0	VII			
26	China, Xinjiang Province	6.0	95.0				
28	Soviet Union, Kuril Islands, Russia	6.9	25.0				

=== July ===
July
- Strongest: 6.8 M_{w} United Kingdom
- Deadliest: 6.0 M_{w} Yugoslavia, Socialist Republic of Macedonia; 1,070 deaths
- Total fatalities: 1,070

Number by magnitude
- 8.0–8.9: 0
- 7.0–7.9: 0
- 6.0–6.9: 8

Date	Country and location	M_{w}	Depth (km)	MMI	Notes	Casualties	
Date	Country and location	M_{w}	Depth (km)	MMI	Notes	Dead	Injured
4	United Kingdom, south of Fiji	6.8	181.3				
9	Costa Rica, off the south coast	6.0	35.0	VI			
16	Soviet Union, Abkhazia, Georgia	6.4	30.0	VII			
19	Ligurian Sea	6.3	15.0				
19	Ligurian Sea	6.1	15.0		This came a minute after the last event.		
26	Yugoslavia, Skopje, Socialist Republic of Macedonia	6.0	15.0	X	This event struck directly under Skopje. 1,070 people were killed and 3,300 were injured. Extensive damage was caused with costs being $1 billion (1963 rate).	1,070	3,300
29	New Zealand, Kermadec Islands	6.6	25.0	rowspan="2"| Doublet earthquake.			
30	New Zealand, Kermadec Islands	6.5	25.0				

=== August ===
August
- Strongest: 7.7 M_{w} Peru
- Deadliest: 6.5 M_{w} China; 1 death
- Total fatalities: 1

Number by magnitude
- 8.0–8.9: 0
- 7.0–7.9: 2
- 6.0–6.9: 5

Date	Country and location	M_{w}	Depth (km)	MMI	Notes	Casualties	
Date	Country and location	M_{w}	Depth (km)	MMI	Notes	Dead	Injured
8	Australia, East New Britain Province, Papua and New Guinea	6.0	50.0	V			
15	Japan, off the east coast of Honshu	6.5	35.0	IV			
15	Peru, Puno Region	7.7	550.0	IV	Some damage was reported.		
17	Japan, south of Kyushu	6.4	35.0	VI			
25	United Kingdom, Fiji	7.0	570.0	III			
29	China, southern Xinjiang Province	6.5	15.0	VII	1 person died and 40 homes were destroyed.	1	
29	Peru, off the north coast	6.6	25.0				

=== September ===
September
- Strongest: 7.4 M_{w} United Kingdom
- Deadliest: 2 events caused 1 death each.
- Total fatalities: 2

Number by magnitude
- 8.0–8.9: 0
- 7.0–7.9: 2
- 6.0–6.9: 4

Date	Country and location	M_{w}	Depth (km)	MMI	Notes	Casualties	
Date	Country and location	M_{w}	Depth (km)	MMI	Notes	Dead	Injured
9	Australia, New Ireland (island), Papua and New Guinea	6.2	15.0	VII			
15	United Kingdom, Santa Cruz Islands, Solomon Islands	7.4	35.0	IX	A large event followed a couple of days later. This is an example of a doublet earthquake.		
17	Peru, off the central coast	6.0	68.0	VI	Foreshock.		
17	United Kingdom, Santa Cruz Islands, Solomon Islands	7.2	45.0	VIII			
18	Turkey, eastern Sea of Marmara	6.2	30.0	VI	1 person was killed and at least 51 were injured. 7 homes were destroyed and 163 were damaged.	1	51+
24	Peru, off the central coast	6.9	64.1	VII	1 person was killed and some damage was caused.	1	

=== October ===
October
- Strongest: 8.5 M_{w} Soviet Union
- Total fatalities: 0

Number by magnitude
- 8.0–8.9: 1
- 7.0–7.9: 2
- 6.0–6.9: 4

Date	Country and location	M_{w}	Depth (km)	MMI	Notes	Casualties	
Date	Country and location	M_{w}	Depth (km)	MMI	Notes	Dead	Injured
3	Japan, off the east coast of Kyushu	6.2	35.0	V			
12	Soviet Union, Kuril Islands, Russia	7.0	37.5	V	Foreshock.		
13	Soviet Union, Kuril Islands, Russia	8.5	35.0	IX	The 1963 Kuril Islands earthquake caused some property damage. A tsunami was observed.		
15	Indonesia, Seram	6.0	25.0	VI			
16	Soviet Union, Gorno-Badakhshan Autonomous Region, Tajikistan	6.5	35.0	VI			
20	Soviet Union, Kuril Islands, Russia	7.8	28.2	VI	Aftershock.		
31	Tonga	6.3	16.5				

=== November ===
November
- Strongest: 8.1 M_{w} Indonesia
- Total fatalities: 0

Number by magnitude
- 8.0–8.9: 1
- 7.0–7.9: 1
- 6.0–6.9: 6

Date	Country and location	M_{w}	Depth (km)	MMI	Notes	Casualties	
Date	Country and location	M_{w}	Depth (km)	MMI	Notes	Dead	Injured
3	Peru, Amazonas Region	6.2	25.0	VI			
4	Indonesia, Banda Sea	8.1	65.0	VIII	Some damage was caused.		
6	Indonesia, Papua (province)	6.3	25.0	VI			
9	Brazil, Acre (state)	7.6	590.7				
10	Brazil, Acre (state)	6.3	593.9		Aftershock.		
10	Soviet Union, Kuril Islands, Russia	6.5	21.2		Aftershock.		
18	Mexico, Gulf of California	6.4	15.0	VII			
23	Mexico, Gulf of California	6.1	15.0		Aftershock.		

=== December ===
December
- Strongest: 7.6 M_{w} United Kingdom
- Total fatalities: 0

Number by magnitude
- 8.0–8.9: 0
- 7.0–7.9: 2
- 6.0–6.9: 2

Date	Country and location	M_{w}	Depth (km)	MMI	Notes	Casualties	
Date	Country and location	M_{w}	Depth (km)	MMI	Notes	Dead	Injured
3	Chile, Antofagasta Region	6.3	35.0	VI			
15	Indonesia, Java Sea	7.0	661.5				
16	Indonesia, Sunda Strait	6.5	45.0	VI	Some homes were damaged.		
18	United Kingdom, south of Fiji	7.6	55.0	VIII			
