= List of earthquakes in 1910 =

Earthquakes in 1910
Approximate epicenters of the earthquakes in 1910
- 4.0–5.9 magnitude
- 6.0–6.9 magnitude
- 7.0–7.9 magnitude
- 8.0+ magnitude
- Strongest magnitude: Empire of Japan northeast of Taiwan (Magnitude 8.1) April 12
- Deadliest: Costa Rica northeast of San José, Costa Rica May 4 (Magnitude 6.4) 700 deaths
- Total fatalities: 714

Number by magnitude
- 9.0+: 0

This is a list of earthquakes in 1910. Only earthquakes that had a magnitude of 6.0 or greater appear on the list. Lower magnitude events were included if they had caused death, injury or damage. Events which occurred in remote areas were excluded from the list as they wouldn't have generated significant media interest. All dates are listed according to UTC time. The southwest Pacific Ocean area near New Hebrides and New Caledonia was particularly active that year.

== Overall ==
=== By death toll ===
Rank	Death toll	Magnitude	Location	MMI	Depth (km)	Date
1	700	6.4	Costa Rica, northeast of San José, Costa Rica	( )	0.0	May 4
2	12	6.4	France, Bouira Province	XI (Extreme)	33.0	June 24

- Note: At least 10 casualties

=== By magnitude ===
Rank	Magnitude	Death toll	Location	MMI	Depth (km)	Date
1	8.1	0	Empire of Japan, northeast of	( )	235.0	April 12
2	7.8	0	New Hebrides, Tanna (island)	( )	100.0	June 16
3	7.6	0	Dutch East Indies, Talaud Islands	( )	15.0	December 16
4	7.4	0	Fiji	( )	600.0	August 21
= 5	7.3	0	New Hebrides	( )	80.0	June 1
= 5	7.3	0	New Hebrides	( )	20.0	November 9
= 5	7.3	2	German East Africa, Rukwa Region	( )	15.0	December 13
= 6	7.2	0	Empire of Japan, off south coast of Honshu	( )	350.0	February 12
= 6	7.2	0	New Zealand, Kermadec Islands	( )	0.0	June 29
= 6	7.2	0	German New Guinea, New Britain	( )	80.0	September 7
= 6	7.2	0	Chile, Antofagasta Region	( )	120.0	October 4
= 6	7.2	0	southern Atlantic Ocean	( )	60.0	November 15
= 6	7.2	0	New Hebrides	( )	50.0	November 26
= 6	7.2	0	British Solomon Islands, southeast of Makira	( )	50.0	December 10
= 6	7.2	0	Fiji	( )	600.0	December 14
= 7	7.1	0	Honduras, off northern coast of	( )	60.0	January 1
= 7	7.1	0	New Hebrides	( )	80.0	March 30
= 7	7.1	0	Norway, Queen Maud Land, Antarctica	( )	0.0	March 31
= 7	7.1	0	New Hebrides	( )	80.0	May 1
= 7	7.1	0	New Hebrides	( )	80.0	June 1
= 7	7.1	0	Chile, Antofagasta Region	( )	0.0	September 6
= 7	7.1	0	New Hebrides	( )	90.0	November 10
= 8	7.0	0	France, southeast of the Loyalty Islands	( )	0.0	January 30
= 8	7.0	0	New Hebrides	( )	0.0	February 4
= 8	7.0	0	Fiji	( )	330.0	April 20
= 8	7.0	0	northern East Pacific Rise	( )	0.0	May 31
= 8	7.0	0	Philippines, Batanes Islands	( )	0.0	September 1
= 8	7.0	0	United States, Andreanof Islands, Alaska	( )	25.0	September 9

- Note: At least 7.0 magnitude

== Notable events ==
=== January ===
January
- Strongest magnitude: 7.1 M_{w} Honduras
- Total fatalities: 0

Number by magnitude
- 8.0–8.9: 0
- 7.0–7.9: 2
- 6.0–6.9: 3

Date	Country and location	M_{w}	Depth (km)	MMI	Notes	Casualties	
Date	Country and location	M_{w}	Depth (km)	MMI	Notes	Dead	Injured
1	Honduras, north of	7.1	60.0				
8	China, Yellow Sea	6.5	20.0		Many homes were destroyed.		
22	Iceland, north of	6.9	0.0		Depth unknown.		
23	Trinidad and Tobago, north of Tobago	6.9	100.0				
30	France, southeast of the Loyalty Islands	7.0	0.0		Depth unknown.		

=== February ===
February
- Strongest magnitude: 7.2 M_{w} Japan
- Total fatalities: 0

Number by magnitude
- 8.0–8.9: 0
- 7.0–7.9: 2
- 6.0–6.9: 3

Date	Country and location	M_{w}	Depth (km)	MMI	Notes	Casualties	
Date	Country and location	M_{w}	Depth (km)	MMI	Notes	Dead	Injured
3	New Hebrides	6.8	0.0		Depth unknown.		
4	New Hebrides	7.0	0.0		Depth unknown.		
12	Japan, off the south coast of Honshu	7.2	350.0				
18	Kingdom of Greece, north of Crete	6.9	150.0				
25	New Guinea, New Britain	6.0	0.0		Depth unknown.		

=== March ===
March
- Strongest magnitude: 7.1 M_{w} 2 events.
- Total fatalities: 0

Number by magnitude
- 8.0–8.9: 0
- 7.0–7.9: 2
- 6.0–6.9: 0

Date	Country and location	M_{w}	Depth (km)	MMI	Notes	Casualties	
Date	Country and location	M_{w}	Depth (km)	MMI	Notes	Dead	Injured
30	New Hebrides	7.1	80.0				
31	Norway, Queen Maud Land, Antarctica	7.1	0.0				

=== April ===
April
- Strongest magnitude: 8.1 M_{w} Taiwan
- Total fatalities: 0

Number by magnitude
- 8.0–8.9: 1
- 7.0–7.9: 1
- 6.0–6.9: 0

Date	Country and location	M_{w}	Depth (km)	MMI	Notes	Casualties	
Date	Country and location	M_{w}	Depth (km)	MMI	Notes	Dead	Injured
12	Taiwan, northeast of	8.1	235.0		Main article: 1910 Taiwan earthquake		
20	Fiji	7.0	330.0				

=== May ===
May
- Strongest magnitude: 7.1 M_{w} New Hebrides
- Deadliest: 6.4 M_{w} Costa Rica; 700 deaths
- Total fatalities: 700

Number by magnitude
- 8.0–8.9: 0
- 7.0–7.9: 2
- 6.0–6.9: 3

Date	Country and location	M_{w}	Depth (km)	MMI	Notes	Casualties	
Date	Country and location	M_{w}	Depth (km)	MMI	Notes	Dead	Injured
1	New Hebrides	7.1	80.0				
4	Costa Rica, northeast of San Jose, Costa Rica	6.4	0.0		The 1910 Costa Rica earthquakes killed at least 700 people and caused widespread destruction. Depth unknown.	700	
13	United States, Bristol Bay, Alaska	6.6	100.0				
22	Russia, Kuril Islands	6.9	35.0				
31	northern East Pacific Rise	7.0	0.0		Depth unknown.		

=== June ===
June
- Strongest magnitude: 7.8 M_{w} New Hebrides
- Deadliest: 6.4 M_{w} French Algeria; 12 deaths
- Total fatalities: 12

Number by magnitude
- 8.0–8.9: 0
- 7.0–7.9: 4
- 6.0–6.9: 5

Date	Country and location	M_{w}	Depth (km)	MMI	Notes	Casualties	
Date	Country and location	M_{w}	Depth (km)	MMI	Notes	Dead	Injured
1	New Hebrides	7.3	80.0				
1	New Hebrides	7.1	80.0		Aftershock.		
9	Japan, Izu Islands	6.7	400.0				
16	Spain, Alboran Sea	6.1	35.0				
16	New Hebrides, Tanna (island)	7.8	100.0				
17	Taiwan, south of	6.8	0.0		Depth unknown.		
24	French Algeria, Bouira Province	6.4	33.0	XI	12 people were killed and damage was reported.	12	
29	New Zealand, Kermadec Islands	7.2	0.0		Depth unknown.		
29	New Zealand, Kermadec Islands	6.9	0.0		Depth unknown.		

=== July ===
July
- Strongest magnitude: 6.7 M_{w} German New Guinea
- Total fatalities: 0

Number by magnitude
- 8.0–8.9: 0
- 7.0–7.9: 0
- 6.0–6.9: 2

Date	Country and location	M_{w}	Depth (km)	MMI	Notes	Casualties	
Date	Country and location	M_{w}	Depth (km)	MMI	Notes	Dead	Injured
12	China, Xinjiang Province	6.6	120.0				
29	German New Guinea, East Sepik Province	6.7	80.0				

=== August ===
August
- Strongest magnitude: 7.4 M_{w} Fiji
- Total fatalities: 0

Number by magnitude
- 8.0–8.9: 0
- 7.0–7.9: 1
- 6.0–6.9: 3

Date	Country and location	M_{w}	Depth (km)	MMI	Notes	Casualties	
Date	Country and location	M_{w}	Depth (km)	MMI	Notes	Dead	Injured
1	Italy, Tyrrhenian Sea	6.5	200.0				
5	United States, off the coast of Oregon	6.6	0.0		Depth unknown.		
21	Fiji	7.4	600.0		Depth unknown.		
21	Greece, southeast of Crete	6.5	170.0				

=== September ===
September
- Strongest magnitude: 7.2 M_{w} German New Guinea
- Total fatalities: 0

Number by magnitude
- 8.0–8.9: 0
- 7.0–7.9: 4
- 6.0–6.9: 2

Date	Country and location	M_{w}	Depth (km)	MMI	Notes	Casualties	
Date	Country and location	M_{w}	Depth (km)	MMI	Notes	Dead	Injured
1	Philippines, Batanes Islands	7.0	0.0		Depth unknown.		
1	Taiwan, off the east coast	6.8	0.0		Depth unknown.		
6	Chile, Antofagasta Region	7.1	0.0		Depth unknown.		
7	German New Guinea, New Britain	7.2	80.0				
9	United States, Andreanof Islands	7.0	25.0				
24	Mexico, Oaxaca	6.7	80.0	IX	Some damage was caused.		

=== October ===
October
- Strongest magnitude: 7.2 M_{w} Chile
- Total fatalities: 0

Number by magnitude
- 8.0–8.9: 0
- 7.0–7.9: 1
- 6.0–6.9: 0

Date	Country and location	M_{w}	Depth (km)	MMI	Notes	Casualties	
Date	Country and location	M_{w}	Depth (km)	MMI	Notes	Dead	Injured
4	Chile, Antofagasta Region	7.2	120.0				

=== November ===
November
- Strongest magnitude: 7.3 M_{w} New Hebrides
- Total fatalities: 0

Number by magnitude
- 8.0–8.9: 0
- 7.0–7.9: 4
- 6.0–6.9: 3

Date	Country and location	M_{w}	Depth (km)	MMI	Notes	Casualties	
Date	Country and location	M_{w}	Depth (km)	MMI	Notes	Dead	Injured
6	Canada, west of Haida Gwaii	6.8	0.0		Depth unknown.		
9	New Hebrides	7.3	20.0				
10	New Hebrides	7.1	90.0		Some damage was reported. A tsunami was observed.		
14	Taiwan, off the northeast coast	6.8	0.0		Depth unknown.		
15	southern Atlantic Ocean	7.2	60.0				
26	New Hebrides	7.2	50.0				
29	Japan, Ryukyu Islands	6.9	0.0		Depth unknown.		

=== December ===
December
- Strongest magnitude: 7.6 M_{w} Dutch East Indies
- Deadliest: 7.3 M_{w} German East Africa; 2 deaths
- Total fatalities: 2

Number by magnitude
- 8.0–8.9: 0
- 7.0–7.9: 4
- 6.0–6.9: 3

Date	Country and location	M_{w}	Depth (km)	MMI	Notes	Casualties	
Date	Country and location	M_{w}	Depth (km)	MMI	Notes	Dead	Injured
4	Dutch East Indies, south of Papua (province)	6.8	0.0		Depth unknown.		
10	British Solomon Islands, southeast of Makira	7.2	50.0				
13	German East Africa, Rukwa Region	7.3	15.0		2 people were killed and some damage was caused.	2	
14	Fiji	7.2	600.0				
16	Dutch East Indies, Talaud Islands	7.6	15.0				
18	Dutch East Indies, Talaud Islands	6.7	0.0	VIII	Aftershock. Some homes were damaged. Depth unknown.		
30	Philippines, northern Mindanao	6.2	60.0	VII	Some damage was caused.		
