= 1910 Taiwan earthquake =

Natural disaster affecting Taiwan

- Location within East China Sea
- UTC time: 1910-04-12 00:22:24
- ISC event
- USGS-ANSS: ComCat
- Local date: April 12, 1910
- Local time: 08:22:13
- Magnitude: 8.1 M_{w}
- Depth: 235.0 km (146.0 mi)
- Epicenter: 25.967°N 124.304°E
- Max. intensity: 5 (Strong)
- Casualties: 60 dead or injured

On April 12, 1910, an earthquake struck with an epicenter off the northern coast of Taiwan. The earthquake measuring M_{w} 8.1 had a hypocenter depth of 235.0 km (146.0 mi). In Taipei and Hsinchu, 13 homes totally collapsed, two partially collapsed, and an additional 57 were damaged. At least 204 homes were destroyed or damaged in Keelung, Shenkeng and Taoyuan. Sixty people died or were injured. Shaking was felt across Taiwan and the Penghu Islands; strong shaking was felt in the northern half of the island. The intermediate-depth of the earthquake suggest it originated from within the subducting Philippine Sea Plate which undergoes subduction.

== See also ==
- List of earthquakes in 1910
- List of earthquakes in Taiwan
