= Tsou Ma Lai Farm =

Farm in Danei, Tainan, Taiwan

Tsou Ma Lai Farm 走馬瀨農場
- Town/City: Danei, Tainan, Taiwan
- Coordinates: 23°8′2.4″N 120°25′41.0″E
- Established: 1988
- Area: 120 ha (300 acres)
- Website: Official website (in Chinese)

The Tsou Ma Lai Farm (traditional Chinese: 走馬瀨農場; simplified Chinese: 走马濑农场; pinyin: Zǒumǎlài Nóngchǎng) is a recreational farm in Danei District, Tainan, Taiwan.

== History ==
The area of the farm used to be the home for the Siraya people. In 1988, it was transformed into a recreational farm named Tsou Ma Lai Farm.

== Geology ==
The farm is surrounded by the Zengwun River within the Alishan Range and spreads over an area of 120 hectares. It is divided into three main areas, which are the main recreational area, orchard recreational area and the pasture recreational area. The farm consists of more than 150 species of animal.

== Events ==
The farm holds the annual Tainan International Mango Festival.

== See also ==
- List of tourist attractions in Taiwan
