= 1963 Su-ao earthquake =

Earthquake in Taiwan

- Location within Taiwan
- UTC time: 1963-02-13 08:50:04
- ISC event: 871818
- USGS-ANSS: ComCat
- Local date: February 13, 1963
- Local time: 16:50
- Magnitude: 7.3 M_{w}
- Depth: 35 km (22 mi)
- Epicenter: 24.35°N 122.06°E
- Areas affected: Taiwan
- Tsunami: 0.2 m (7.9 in)
- Casualties: 3–15 dead 3–18 injured

The 1963 Su-ao earthquake occurred on February 13 at 16:50 local time (08:50 UTC). The epicenter was located off the coast of Taiwan, near Su-ao, Yilan County. It had a magnitude of M_{w} 7.3. The number of reported dead was 3–15 and the number of injured was 3–18.

== Earthquake ==
The earthquake showed a weakly coupled interplate boundary in the nearby region.

== Effects ==
A landslide occurred in the Su-ao-Hualien highway.

== See also ==
- List of earthquakes in 1963
- List of earthquakes in Taiwan
