= 1963 Marj earthquake =

Earthquake affecting Libya

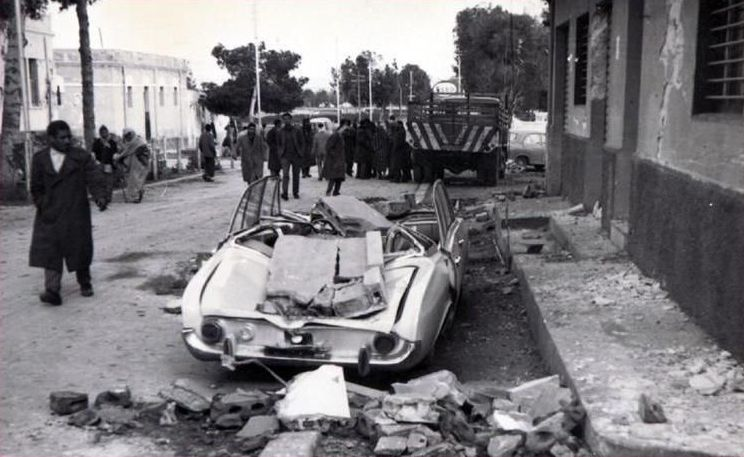
- Damage in Al Marj from the Al Marj earthquake

- Location within Libya
- UTC time: 1963-02-21 17:14:36
- ISC event: 871865
- USGS-ANSS: ComCat
- Local date: February 21, 1963
- Local time: 18:14:36 EEST
- Magnitude: 5.6 M_{w}
- Depth: 25 km (16 mi)
- Epicenter: 32.66°N 21°E
- Areas affected: Libya
- Total damage: $5 million
- Max. intensity: MMI VIII (Severe)
- Casualties: 290–375 dead 375–500 injured 12,000 displaced

The 1963 Marj earthquake occurred on February 21 in northern Libya. The earthquake occurred at 18:14:36 local time with a moment magnitude of 5.6 and a maximum Mercalli intensity of VIII (Severe). Financial losses totaled US$5 million, with 290–375 deaths, 375–500 injuries, and 12,000 people being rendered homeless.

== Tectonic setting ==
The northern part of Cyrenaica lies close to the northern edge of the African plate. Offshore lies the Mediterranean Ridge, an accretionary wedge, developed above the destructive plate boundary where the African plate is being subducted beneath the Aegean Sea plate along the Hellenic subduction zone. The Cyrenaica promontory is thought to be undergoing incipient collision as the continental margin enters the subduction zone. The Cyrenaica region is characterised by relatively low magnitude earthquakes with thrust fault focal mechanisms, developed in an area of NE–SW directed maximum horizontal stress.

== Earthquake ==
The earthquake's epicenter was located about 13 km to the north-northeast of the city of Marj in the Marj District of Cyrenaica. It was felt as far away as Benghazi, about 100 km from the epicenter. The magnitude has been calculated as M_{w}5.6 by the ISC. It was followed later that day by two aftershocks of over M_{w}4.0.

== Damage ==
The main area of damage was restricted to a 20 km long section of the alluvial plain around Marj, which is located between two escarpments, possibly fault-related. The maximum damage was observed at Maddalena, a village about 12 km from Marj and close to the epicenter, in which all the farmhouses collapsed. The effects of the shaking depended on the construction type of the buildings. Those built of rubble masonry were most affected, with many collapsing and causing most of the casualties. Buildings constructed from hollow concrete blocks were only moderately affected and those built with reinforced concrete were almost completely unaffected.

== Aftermath ==
The Libyan authorities followed the recommendations of the UNESCO report and rebuilt Marj on firmer ground about 4 km away from its original location.

== See also ==
- List of earthquakes in 1963
