= 1910 Costa Rica earthquakes =

Earthquake in Central America

- Location within Central America
- UTC time: 1910-05-05 00:27:38
- ISC event
- USGS-ANSS: ComCat
- Local date: 4 May 1910
- Local time: 6:50 p.m.
- Magnitude: 6.1 M_{w}, 6.4 M_{s}
- Depth: 15 km (9.3 mi)
- Epicenter: 9.801°N 83.870°W
- Type: Strike-slip
- Areas affected: Costa Rica
- Max. intensity: MMI VIII (Severe)
- Casualties: 2,450 killed

The 1910 Costa Rica earthquakes were a series of destructive seismic events that affected Cartago, Costa Rica from 13 April to 4 May. The sequence began with a M_{s} 5.8 earthquake. The largest and most destructive in the sequence occurred on 4 May, measuring M_{s} 6.4. A total of 2,450 people were killed and the city of Cartago was severely affected.

== Impact ==
The 13 April earthquake damaged many homes in Cartago and in the surrounding towns. Some buildings collapsed while a few others were so badly damaged that it was unsafe to enter. Public infrastructure and churches were extensively cracked. Military barracks and the Mauro Fernández building in Cartago were demolished. In San José, the Liceo de Costa Rica and the slaughterhouse were badly damaged. About 115 homes partially or completely collapsed. The earthquake caused church bells to ring and stopped public clocks. Forty homes and a church were heavily damaged in Llano Grande, San Rafael and Tejar. There was no documentation of casualties. A maximum Rossi–Forel intensity of VII was evaluated based on building damage.

A second earthquake on 4 May at 6:50 pm caused greater destruction. it was felt with a maximum intensity of VIII in the epicenter region at Cartago. Intensity VII to VI were felt in the Tres Ríos district of the city. At San José, Heredia and Alajuela, it was felt V. Shaking was felt across most of Costa Rica. Lasting 16 seconds, it was sufficient to cause devastation. Cartago was levelled by the mainshock; buildings that did not collapse during the previous earthquake were destroyed. All churches, convents, schools and other public facilities collapsed. Buildings were so badly damaged that they were beyond repair and had to be demolished with dynamite. Nearly every home in the city was declared unsafe to reside. The intense shaking caused niches at the Cartago General Cemetery columbarium to open, revealing bones and cadavers. A bridge that crossed the Agua Caliente River in Aguacaliente collapsed. The majority of homes in Paraíso collapsed. The district church was left in ruins but eventually repaired. In San José, Heredia and Alajuela, fallen objects and damage to plasters were reported.

== Aftermath ==
Many aftershocks were recorded; up to five were felt each day. Fearing a larger earthquake would strike, many residents took refuge in the streets. The following day, the municipal government agreed to construct shelters in the eastern and western parts of the city to house the affected. Many public buildings including schools and banks were closed until 16 April. The government of El Salvador provided US$ 3,500 of gold to assist the affected.

After the 4 May earthquake, at 11:30 p.m., trains arrived at Cartago with volunteers to help transport the injured to San José. President Cleto González Víquez and several government officials also arrived on train. Nine days of national mourning was declared. Many of the dead were immediately buried in mass graves to avoid the spread of diseases. The following day, many people from across the country arrived in Cartago to find their relatives or witness the disaster. Looting was a common occurrence. Reconstruction efforts were carried out and completed before the end of the year. Electrical services and water pipes were fully restored and replaced with modern ones. The destruction prompted President Víquez to propose new seismic codes to prevent a similar disaster. The new regulation did not permit adobe, brick, stone and other heavy construction materials. This action has been regarded as one of the first seismic risk measures taken in Costa Rica.

== Geology ==
Between 13 April and 4 May, there were over 600 earthquake recorded in the area. Strong aftershocks continued to rock the area including a damaging magnitude 5.2 on 21 February 1912. The Cartago area hosts many strike-slip and reverse faults. These faults are located at the southern slopes of the Irazú Volcano where its eruptive activity in the Pleistocene has buried the fault-related geomorphology. Among them is the Aguacaliente Fault, a 23 km (14 mi)-long east-west trending strike-slip fault, source of the 1910 earthquakes. The fault was also the source of a destructive earthquake in 1951. Within the last 1,000 years, the fault is associated with three surface rupturing earthquakes, based on paleoseismic studies. The 1910 earthquakes is associated with the most recent surface rupturing earthquake.

== See also ==
- List of earthquakes in 1910
- List of earthquakes in Costa Rica
