= Dapu, Chiayi =

Rural township in Chiayi County, Taiwan

Dapu Township 大埔鄉
- Rural township
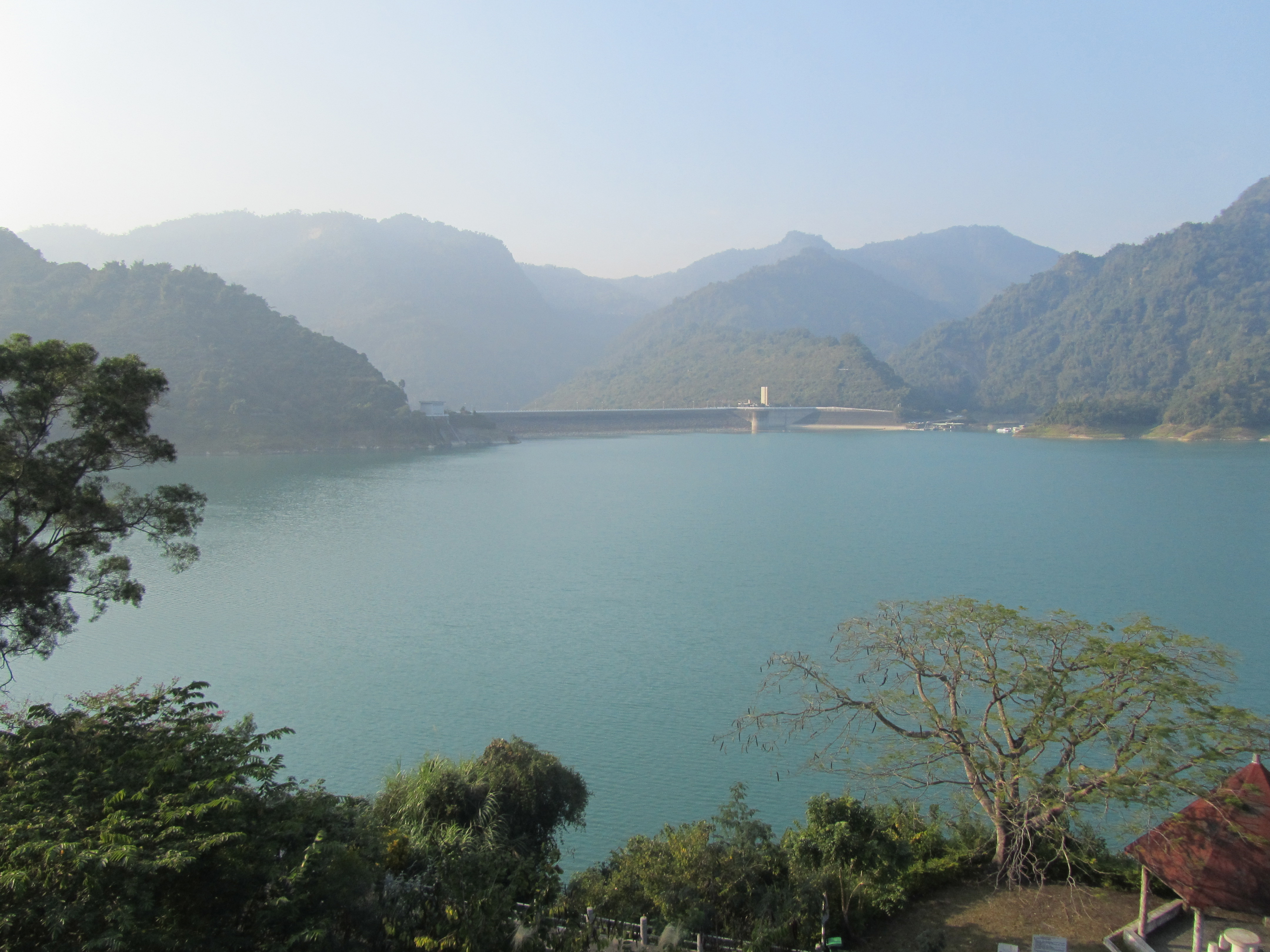
- Zengwen Reservoir

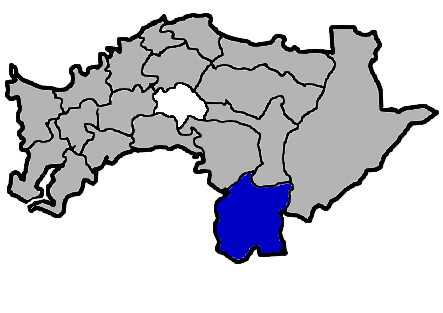
- Dapu Township in Chiayi County

- Location within Taiwan
- Coordinates: 23°17′40.4″N 120°35′37.4″E
- Location: Chiayi County, Taiwan

Area
  - Total: 173 km^{2} (67 sq mi)

Population (May 2022)
  - Total: 4,504

Dapu Township (Chinese: 大埔鄉; pinyin: Dàpǔ Xiāng) is a rural township in Chiayi County, Taiwan. Part of the Siraya National Scenic Area, Dapu gets a major portion of its revenue from tourism. Among the birds that can be seen in the area is the fairy pitta.

== History ==
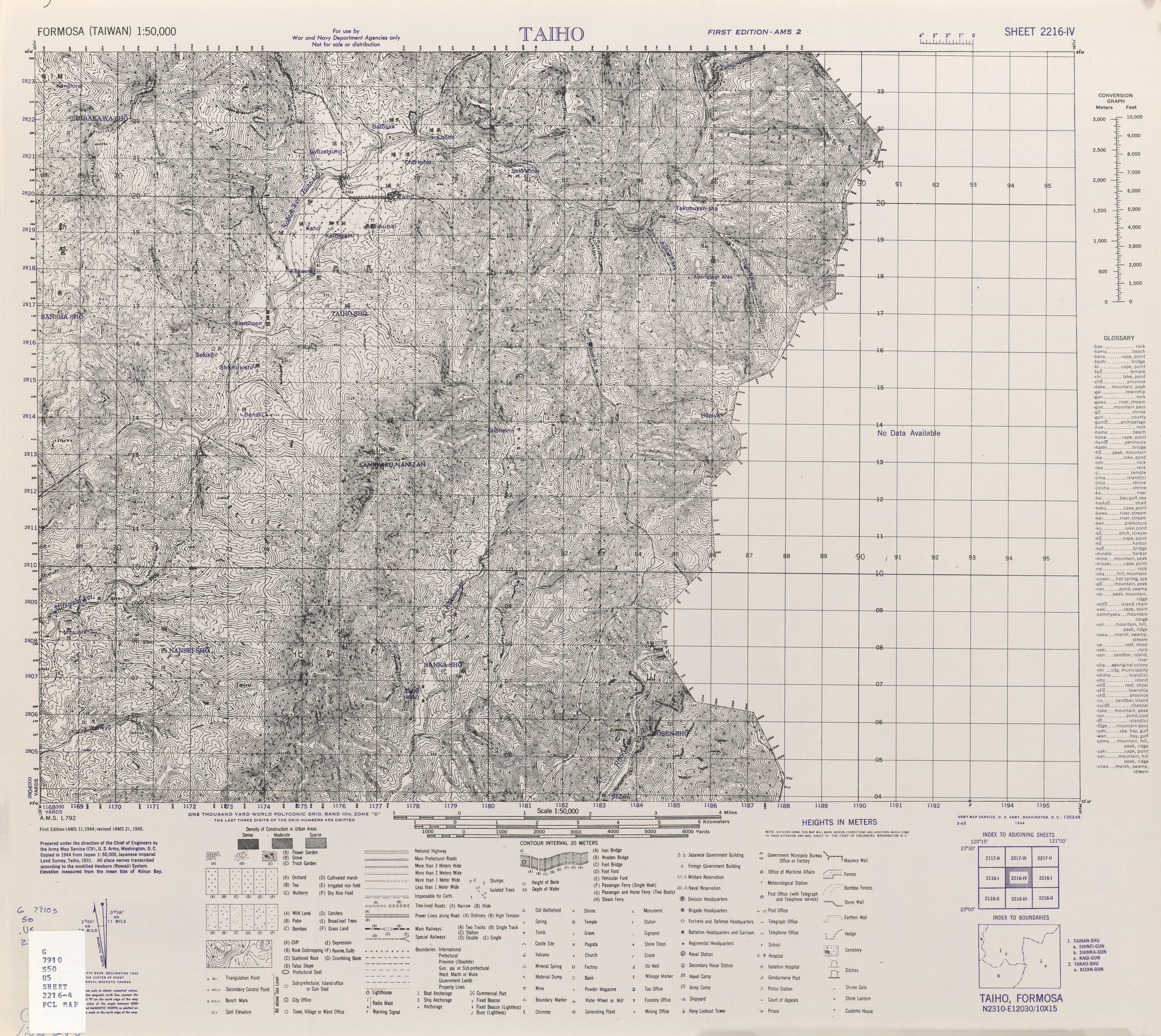
Map of Dapu (labeled as TAIHO-SHŌ 大埔庄) and surrounding areas (1944)

Human activity is believed to have existed in Dapu since prehistoric times. Artifacts have been found in archaeological sites nearby.

The Dutch East India Company started its colonization of Taiwan in 1624. When it established its presence in what is now Chiayi County in 1636, Dapu was a Tsou territory with no recorded Han Chinese activity. According to a 1647 census conducted by the Dutch, Kanakannavo, the tribe that resided in Dapu, contained 37 households (157 residents).

== Geography ==
The township has an area of 173.2472 km^{2} with a population of 4,504 people as of May 2022.

== Administrative divisions ==
Administrative divisions of Dapu Township

The township comprises five villages: Dapu, Heping, Jiadong, Xixing and Yongle.

== Economy ==
A total of 5.2% of its land is used for agriculture.

== Tourist attractions ==
- Siraya National Scenic Area
- Zengwen Reservoir

== Transportation ==
The township is served by three access roads, which lead northwards towards Fanlu and Zhongpu Townships and southwards towards Nansi District in Tainan.
