= 2010 Kaohsiung earthquake =

Earthquake in Taiwan

2010 Kaohsiung earthquakes
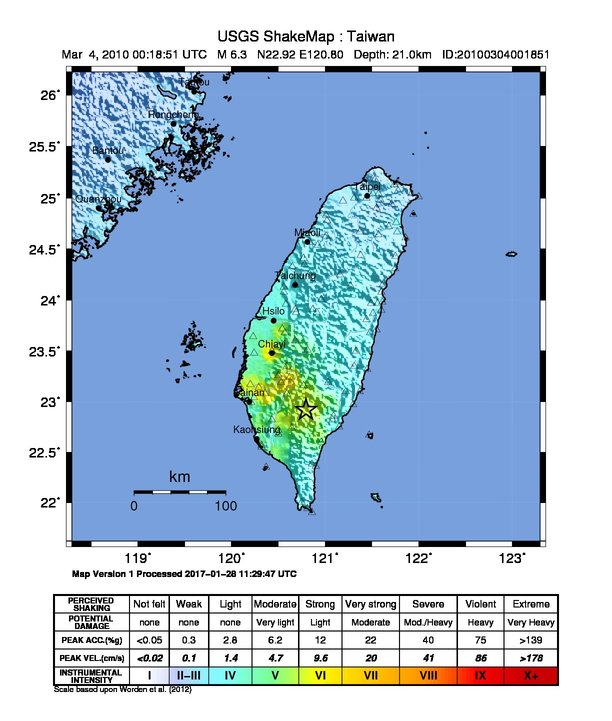

- UTC time: 2010-03-04 00:18:51
- ISC event: 14351162
- USGS-ANSS: ComCat
- Local date: March 4, 2010
- Local time: 08:18:51
- Magnitude: 6.3 M_{w}
- Depth: 5 kilometres (3 mi)
- Epicenter: 22.92°N 120.8°E
- Areas affected: Southern Taiwan
- Max. intensity: MMI VI (Strong)
- Casualties: 96 injuries

The 2010 Kaohsiung earthquake, measuring 6.3 M_{w}, occurred on March 4 at 08:18 a.m. local time. The epicenter was located in the mountainous area of Kaohsiung County (now part of Kaohsiung City) of the southwestern Taiwan. It was the most powerful earthquake in Kaohsiung since 1900. The earthquake did not cause any deaths, but 96 people were injured.

== Tectonic setting ==
Taiwan lies on the boundary between the Eurasian plate and the Philippine Sea plate, which are converging at 80 mm per year. The island is the result of uplift caused by the collision between the northern end of the Luzon Arc and the continental margin of China.

== Damage ==
=== Electricity ===
The earthquake caused the tripping of several power stations in Taiwan, leading to a loss of 1,860 MW of electricity. Some transformers and substations on the electrical grid caused power outage to 545,066 houses on the island. Electricity was fully restored before 11:30 a.m.

=== Transportation ===
A bridge which connects Kaohsiung and Pingtung was blocked when it sank after the earthquake. Some THSR trains were disrupted, and one was de-railed while emergency braking.

=== Buildings ===
340 buildings and several schools were damaged by the quake. A religious building and some old structures collapsed.

=== Factories ===
A fire, which cost about 100 million TWD (US$4 million in 2025), occurred at a factory of the Everest Textile Co., Ltd (宏遠興業) in Tainan County (now part of Tainan City), The quake also caused around 1 billion NTD in losses to several manufacturers in a high-tech industrial park.

== Aftershocks ==
The earthquake was followed by several aftershocks; the largest had a magnitude of 5.7 on the Richter scale on April 25.

== Government response ==
While the government continues to monitor the situation, Taiwan's Ministry of Defense dispatched troops to Jiasian.

== See also ==
- List of earthquakes in 2010
- List of earthquakes in Taiwan
- 2016 southern Taiwan earthquake
- 2025 Tainan–Chiayi earthquake
