= Nansi District =

District in Tainan, Taiwan

Coordinates: 23.179274°N 120.484581°E

Nansi 楠西區 Nanhsi, Nanxi
- District
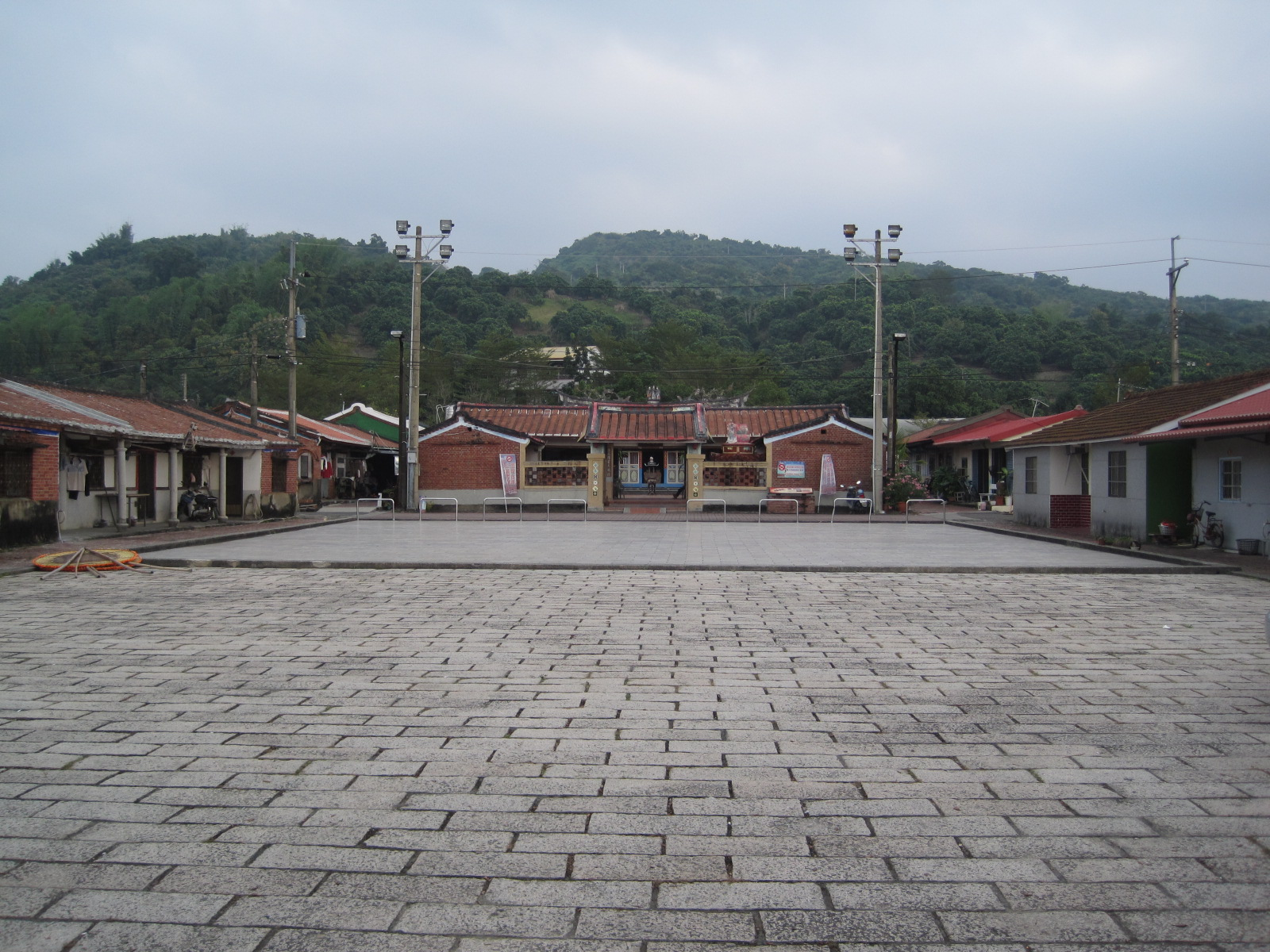

- 臺南市 楠西區公所; Nansi District Office, Tainan City

- Nansi District in Tainan City
- Location: Tainan, Taiwan

Area
  - Total: 110 km^{2} (42 sq mi)

Population (May 2022)
  - Total: 8,951
  - Density: 81/km^{2} (210/sq mi)
- Website: nansi.tainan.gov.tw/en (in English)

Nansi District (Chinese: 楠西區; Hanyu Pinyin: Nánxī Qū; Tongyong Pinyin: Nánsi Cyu; Wade–Giles: Nan^{2}-hsi^{1} Ch'ü^{1}; Pe̍h-ōe-jī: Lâm-se-khu), alternatively spelled Nanxi, is a rural district of about 8,951 residents in Tainan, Taiwan.

== Name ==
Nansi (楠西) was so named because it is west of the Cishan River (Qishan). The 'nan' (楠) in 'Nansi' is an abbreviation for Nanzixian River (楠梓仙溪), an alternate name for Cishan River. The 'si' (西) means 'west'. This name originated in the period of Taiwan under Japanese rule.

== History ==
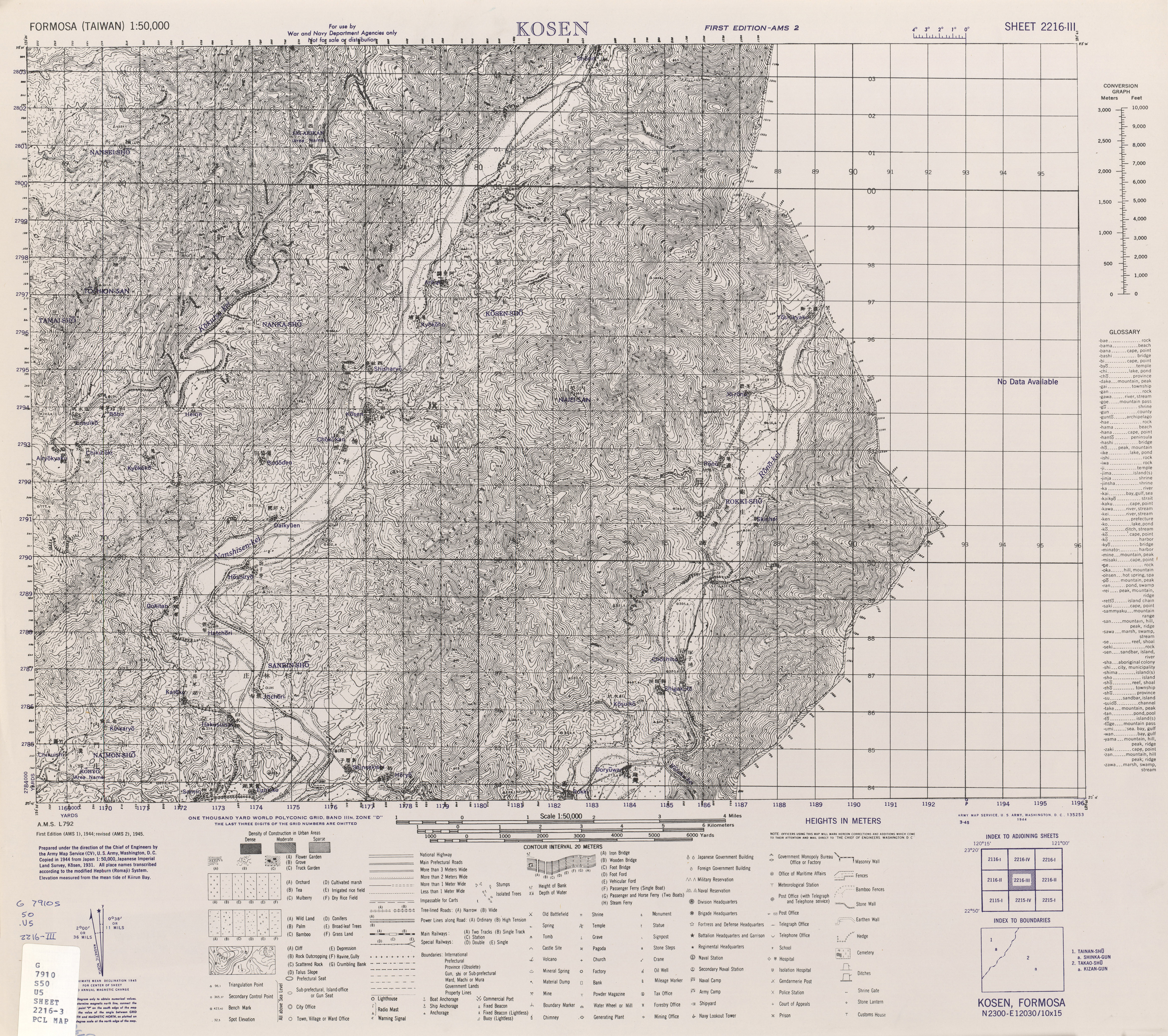
Map including Nansi (upper left) (labeled as 楠西庄 NANSEI-SHO) (AMS, 1944)

After the handover of Taiwan from Japan to the Republic of China in 1945, Nansi was organized as a rural township of Tainan County. On 25 December 2010, Tainan County was merged with Tainan City and Nansi was upgraded to a district of the city.

== Geography ==
Nansi District borders Nanhua District to the east; Yujing District to the south; Dongshan District, Lioujia District, and Danei District to the west; and Dapu, Chiayi to the north.

== Administrative divisions ==
The district consists of Nanxi, Wanqiu, Miqi, Zhaoxing, Lutian, Guidan and Tungshi Village.

== Tourist attractions ==
- Lutaoyang Jiang Family Residence
- Plum Mountain

== See also ==
- Tainan
