= List of earthquakes in Taiwan =

Map of notable earthquakes in Taiwan 1900– (map data)

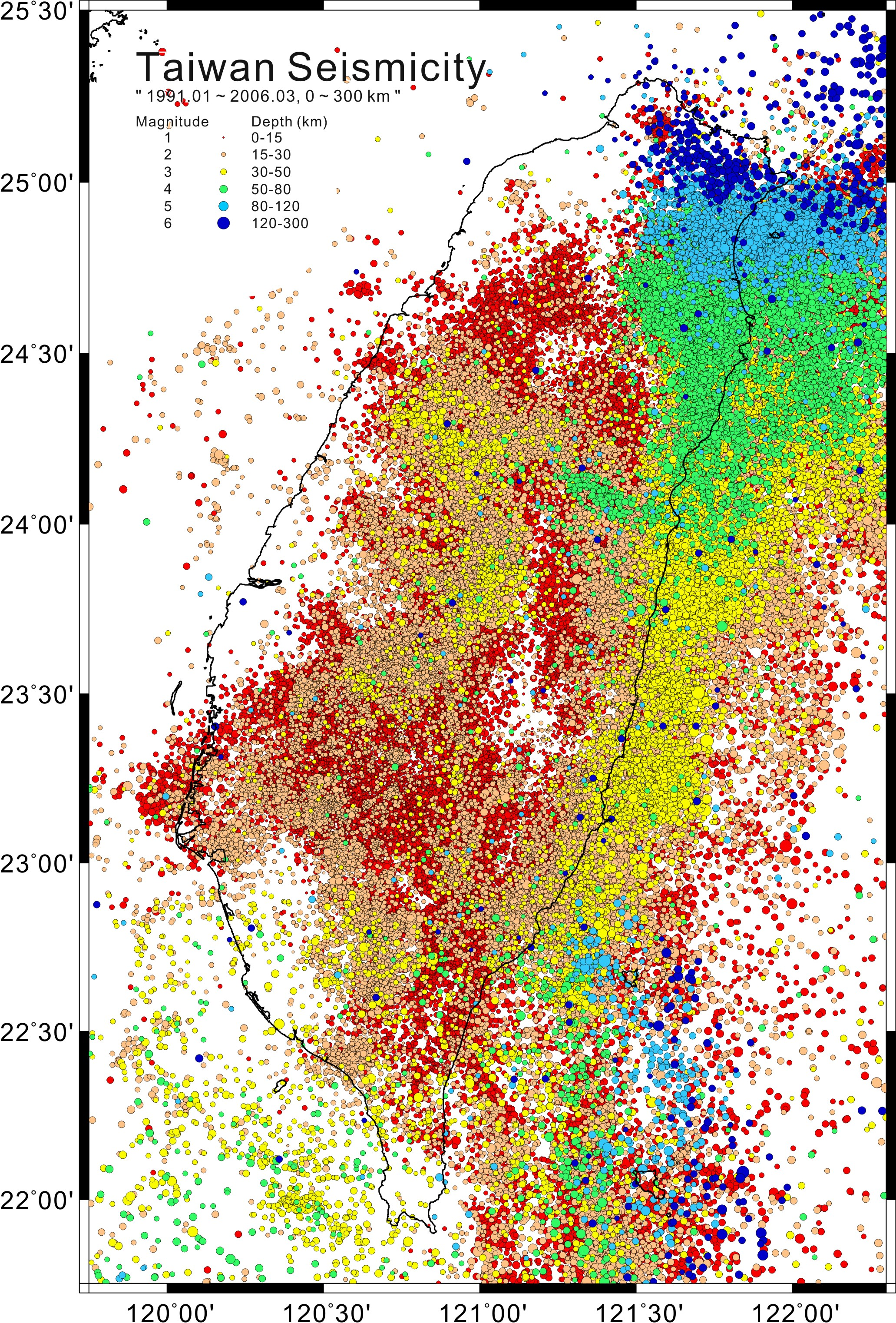
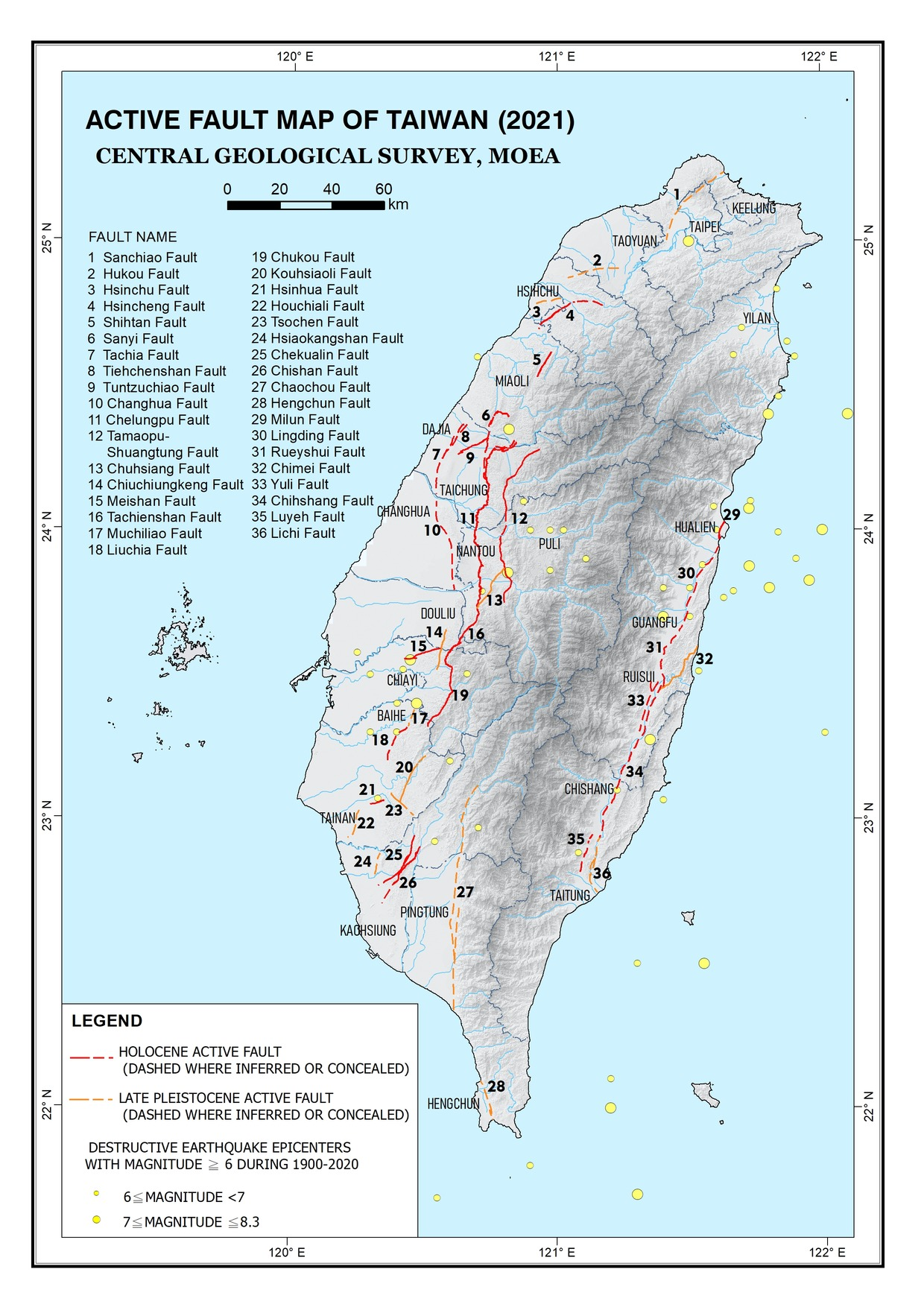
Plot of earthquake data (left) and the fault distribution in Taiwan

Taiwan is in a seismically active zone, on the Pacific Ring of Fire, and at the western edge of the Philippine Sea plate. Geologists have identified 42 active faults on the island, but most of the earthquakes detected in Taiwan are due to the convergence of the Philippine Sea plate and the Eurasian plate to the east of the island. Most of the earthquakes registered in Taiwan actually occur off the east coast and cause little damage, whereas smaller quakes beneath the island itself have historically proven more destructive. The first recorded earthquake in Taiwan was in 1624, the founding year of Dutch Formosa. Between 1901 and 2000, there were 91 major earthquakes in Taiwan, 48 of them resulting in fatalities. The most recent major earthquake was the 2024 Hualien earthquake, and the most recent major earthquake with a high death toll was the 921 earthquake, which struck on 21 September 1999, and claimed 2,415 lives.

Many modern buildings in Taiwan are constructed with earthquake safety in mind, such as the tallest building in Taiwan, Taipei 101, which had to cope with the dual challenges of being flexible enough to withstand earthquakes, yet rigid enough to resist wind shear. The High Speed Rail system incorporates an automatic safety device to safely bring all trains to a halt when a significant earthquake is detected. Nevertheless, poor construction standards have been blamed for casualties in a number of major earthquakes, including the 1906 Meishan earthquake and the 1999 Jiji earthquake. Inside Taiwan the Central Weather Bureau is the organisation responsible for monitoring and reporting on earthquakes. Large earthquakes are also assessed by the United States Geological Survey. Scientific studies of the seismology of the island started in the Japanese era, when the first seismograph was installed in Taipei by Fusakichi Omori's company.

== Earthquakes ==
Significant earthquakes are listed here from 1736 to the present. Starting with the Japanese era in 1895 there were major improvements in detection technology, allowing more detailed gathering of data.

Date	Areas	Lat	Long	Depth (km)	Mag.	MMI	Deaths	Injuries	Houses destroyed / other damage	Notes
2025-01-20	Tainan, Chiayi	23.234	120.475	10.0	6.0 M_{w}	VI		50	Hundreds of buildings destroyed Additional damage from aftershocks Power outages	
2024-04-03	Island-wide	23.819	121.562	34.8	7.4 M_{w}	VIII	19	1,145+	Some buildings collapsed Bridge collapsed	
2022-09-18	Taitung	23.159	121.316	10.0	6.9 M_{w}	IX	1	171	Bridge collapsed Some buildings collapsed	
2022-03-22	Taitung	23.409	121.559	24.0	6.7 M_{w}	VII		1	Power outages Bridge collapsed	
2022-01-03	Hualien	23.997	122.235	28.7	6.2 M_{w}	IV			Some buildings were damaged	
2021-10-24	Yilan	24.571	121.830	64.5	6.2 M_{w}	VI		1		
2021-07-13	Hualien	23.902	121.623	10.0	5.2 M_{w}	III			Minor damage	
2019-08-07	Yilan	24.478	121.930	20.8	5.8 M_{w}	VI	1			
2019-04-18	Hualien	24.037	121.650	20.0	6.1 M_{w}	VI	1	16		
2018-02-06	Hualien	24.134	121.659	17.0	6.4 M_{w}	VIII	17	277	Some buildings collapsed	
2017-02-10	Tainan	22.83	120.22	15.8	5.3 M_{w}	VII		4	Power outages	
2016-02-06	Tainan, Kaohsiung	22.94	120.59	23	6.4 M_{w}	VII	117	550	9	
2015-04-20	Yilan	24.05	122.37	5	6.4 M_{w}	V	1			
2013-10-31	Hualien	23.62	121.43	19.5	6.3 M_{w}	VII	0			
2013-06-02	Island-wide	23.87	121.0	10.0	6.2 M_{w}	VII	5	18		
2013-03-27	Island-wide	23.9	121.07	19.4	5.9 M_{w}	V	1	97		
2012-02-26	Pingtung	22.75	120.75	26.3	6.4		0			
2010-03-04	Kaohsiung	22.92	120.73	5	6.3 M_{w}	VI		96		
2009-12-19	Hualien	23.76	121.69	43	6.4 M_{w}	VI		6		
2006-12-26	Pingtung	21.69	120.56	44.1	7.1 M_{w}	VII	2		3	
2006-12-26	Pingtung	21.97	120.42	50.2	6.9 M_{w}	V	2		3	
2004-10-15	Yilan, Su-ao	24.5	122.696		6.7 M_{w}					
2004-05-01	Hualien	24.1	121.95	17.8	5.8		2			
2002-05-15	Yilan, Hualien	24.6	121.9	5	6.2 M_{w}	VI	1			
2002-03-31	Hualien, Taipei	24.2	122.1	9.6	7.1 M_{w}		7		6	
2000-06-11	Nantou	23.9	121.1	10.2	6.4 M_{w}		2			
2000-05-17	Nantou	24.2	121.1	3	5.3		3			
1999-09-21	Island-wide	23.9	120.8	8	7.7 M_{w}	X+	2,415			
1998-07-17	Nantou	23.5	120.7	3	6.2		5			
1995-06-25	Yilan	24.6	121.7	40	6.0 M_{w}		1		6	
1995-02-23	Hualien	24.2	121.7	21.7	6.2 M_{w}		2			
1994-09-16	Taiwan Strait	22.5	118.7	13	6.8 M_{w}		0		0	
1994-06-05	Yilan	24.4	121.8	5.3	6.4 M_{w}	VII	1		1	
1990-12-13	Hualien	23.9	121.5	3	6.7 M_{w}	VII	2		3	
1986-11-15	Hualien	24.0	121.8	15	7.4 M_{w}	VII	15		37	
1986-05-20	Hualien	24.1	121.6	16	6.2 M_{w}	VIII	1			
1982-01-23	Yilan, Hualien	24.0	121.6	3	6.5		1			
1978-12-13	Hualien	23.3	121.6	4	7.0 M_{w}	VI	2			
1972-04-24	Hualien	23.5	121.4	15	7.0 M_{w}	VII	5		50	
1972-01-25	Taitung	22.5	122.3	33	7.3 M_{w}	VI	1		5	
1967-10-25	Yilan	24.4	122.1	20	6.8 M_{w}	VII	2		21	
1966-03-13	Hualien	24.2	122.7	42	7.5 M_{w}	VII	4		24	
1964-01-18	Chiayi, Tainan	23.2	120.6	18	6.5 M_{w}	VI	106		10,924	
1963-03-04	Yilan	24.6	121.1	5	6.3 M_{w}		1			
1963-02-13	Yilan	24.35	122.06	47	7.2 M_{w}	VII	3–15	3–18	6	
1959-08-15	Pingtung	21.7	121.3	20	7.1		16		1,214	
1959-04-27	Northeast Taiwan	24.1	123.0	150	7.7		1		9	
1957-10-20	Hualien	23.7	121.5	10	6.6		4			
1957-02-24	Hualien	23.8	121.8	30	7.3		11		44	
1951-11-25	Taitung	23.3	121.3	30	7.8M_{w}		17			
1951-10-22	Hualien	23.9	121.7	25	7.5M_{w}		68			
1946-12-05	Tainan	23.1	120.3	5	6.1		74		1,954	
1943-12-02	Taitung	22.5	121.5	40	6.8 M_{w}		3		139	
1943-10-23	Hualien	23.8	121.5	5	6.2		1		1	
1941-12-17	Chiayi	23.4	120.5	12	7.2M_{w}		360		4,520	
1935-07-17	Hsinchu, Taichung	24.6	120.7	30	6.2		44		1,734	
1935-04-21	Miaoli, Taichung	24.4	120.8	5	7.1M_{w}		3,276		17,907	
1930-12-08	Tainan	23.3	120.4	20	6.3 M_{w}		4		49	
1927-08-25	Tainan	23.3	120.5		6.8 M_{uk}		9–30	27–100	200–214	
1922-12-02	Hualien	24.6	122.0		6.0		1		1	
1922-10-15	Hualien	24.6	122.3	20	5.9		6			
1922-09-22	Hualien	24.5	122	20	7.6		5		14	
1920-06-05	Hualien	24.6	121.9	20	8.2		8	24	273	
1917-01-07	Central Taiwan	23.9	120.9	shallow	5.5				187	
1917-01-05	Central Taiwan	24.0	121.0	shallow	6.2		54		130	
1916-11-15	Central Taiwan	24.1	120.9	3	6.2		1		97	
1916-08-28	Central Taiwan	24.0	121.0	45	6.8		16		614	
1910-04-12	Keelung	25.1	122.9	200	8.3		60		13	
1909-04-15	Taipei	23.7	121.5	80	7.3		9		122	
1908-01-11	Hualien	23.7	121.4	10	7.3		2		3	
1906-04-14	Tainan	23.4	120.4	20	6.6		15		1,794	
1906-03-17	Chiayi	23.6	120.5	6	6.8 M_{s}	IX	1,258–1,266	2,385–2,476	14,218–30,021	
1904-11-06	Chiayi	23.6	120.3	7	6.1		145		661	
1904-04-24	Chiayi	23.5	120.3	–	6.1		3		66	
1897-03-15	Yilan, Taipei	–	–	–		–	56		50	
1882-12-09	Island-wide	23.0	121.4	–	~7.5		10		40	
1881-02-18	Taipei, Hsinchu, Miaoli	24.6	120.7	–	~6.2		11		210	
1867-12-18	Greater Taipei	25.3	121.7	–	~7.0		580			
1865-11-06	Taipei	24.9	121.6	–	~6.0		"many"			
1862-06-07	Changhua	23.2	120.2	–	~7.0		over 500		over 500	
1848-12-03	Chiayi	24.1	120.5	–	~7.1		1,030		13,993	
1845-03-04	Taichung	24.1	120.7	–	~6.0		381		4220	
1815-10-13	From Chiayi northwards	24.0	121.7	–	~7.7		113		243	
1811-03-17	From Chiayi northwards	23.8	121.8	–	~7.5		21		41	
1792-08-09	Yunlin	23.6	120.5	–	~7.1		617		24,621	
1736-01-30	Tainan	23.1	120.5	–	~6.5		372		698	
M_{uk} = Unknown magnitude scale, M_{L} = Richter scale, M_{s} = surface-wave magnitude, and M_{w} = moment magnitude scale. The inclusion criteria for adding events are based on WikiProject Earthquakes' notability guideline that was developed for stand alone articles. The principles described are also applicable to lists. In summary, only damaging, injurious, or deadly events should be recorded.

== See also ==
- Geology of Taiwan
