= Tainan Astronomical Education Area =

Education center in Danei, Tainan, Taiwan

- 南瀛天文教育園區
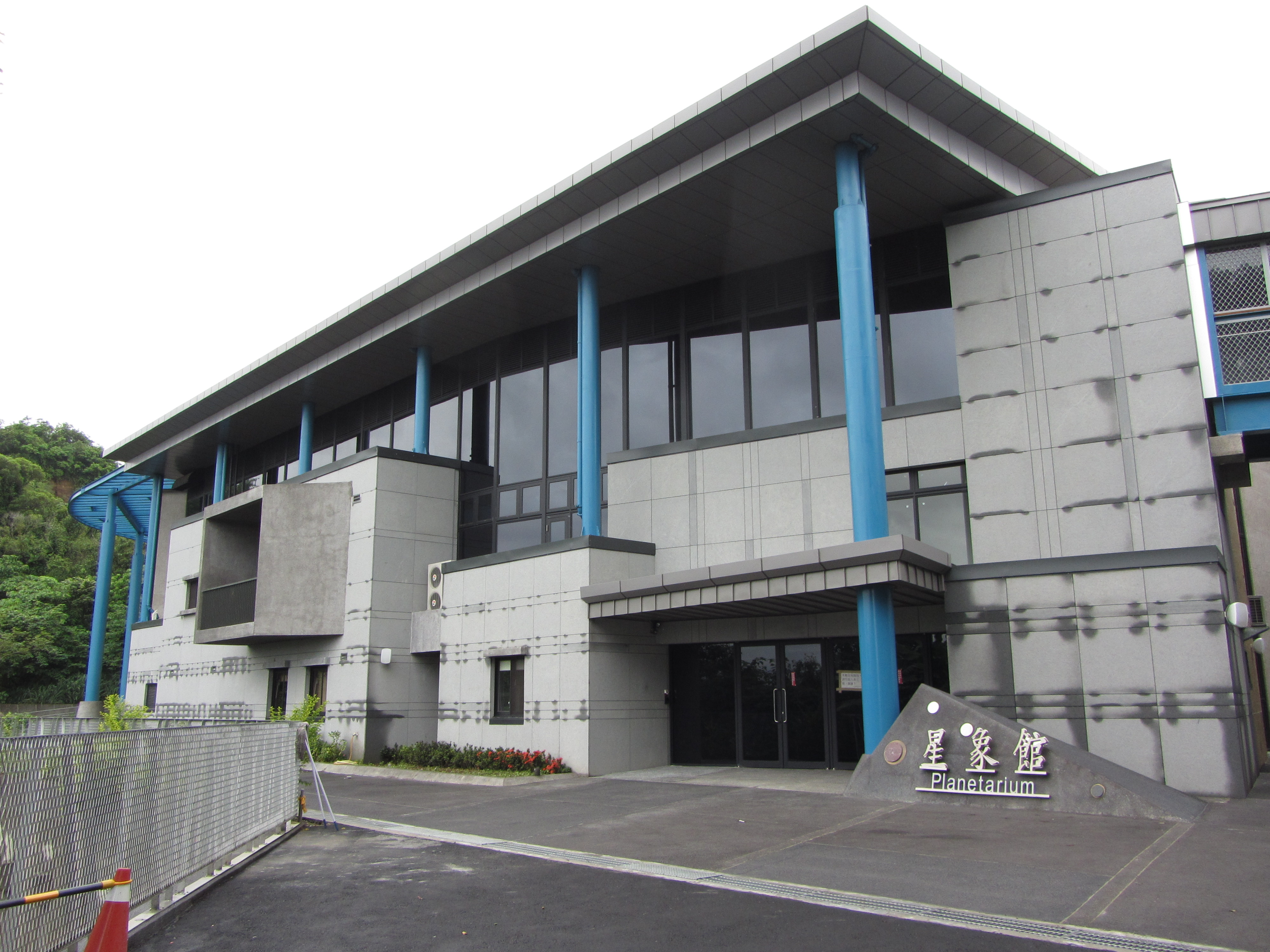
- Interactive map of the Tainan Astronomical Education Area area

General information
- Location: Danei, Tainan, Taiwan
- Coordinates: 23°07′02.7″N 120°23′30.3″E
- Construction started: 2004
- Completed: 2012
- Opened: 29 June 2013

Website
- Official website

The Tainan Astronomical Education Area (TAEA; traditional Chinese: 南瀛天文教育園區; simplified Chinese: 南瀛天文教育园区; pinyin: Nányíng Tiānwén Jiàoyù Yuánqū) is an educational center in Quxi Village, Danei District, Tainan, Taiwan.

== History ==
In 2002, Danei Township was selected as the site to construct the building. Being the first phase of the construction, the observatory was constructed starting 2004 and completed on 11 August 2006. It was then opened for use on 1 January 2007. The main construction was completed in 2012. It started its trial operation on 1 February 2013 and was officially opened on 29 June 2013.

== Architecture ==
Located at an elevation of 110 meters above sea level, the complex consists of observatory, astronomy museum and planetarium. It features a 76 cm telescope, the largest telescope on ground level in Taiwan.

== See also ==
- List of tourist attractions in Taiwan
- List of science centers#Asia
