= Danei District =

District in Tainan, Taiwan

Coordinates: 23.142254°N 120.39843°E

Danei 大內區 Ōuchi
- District
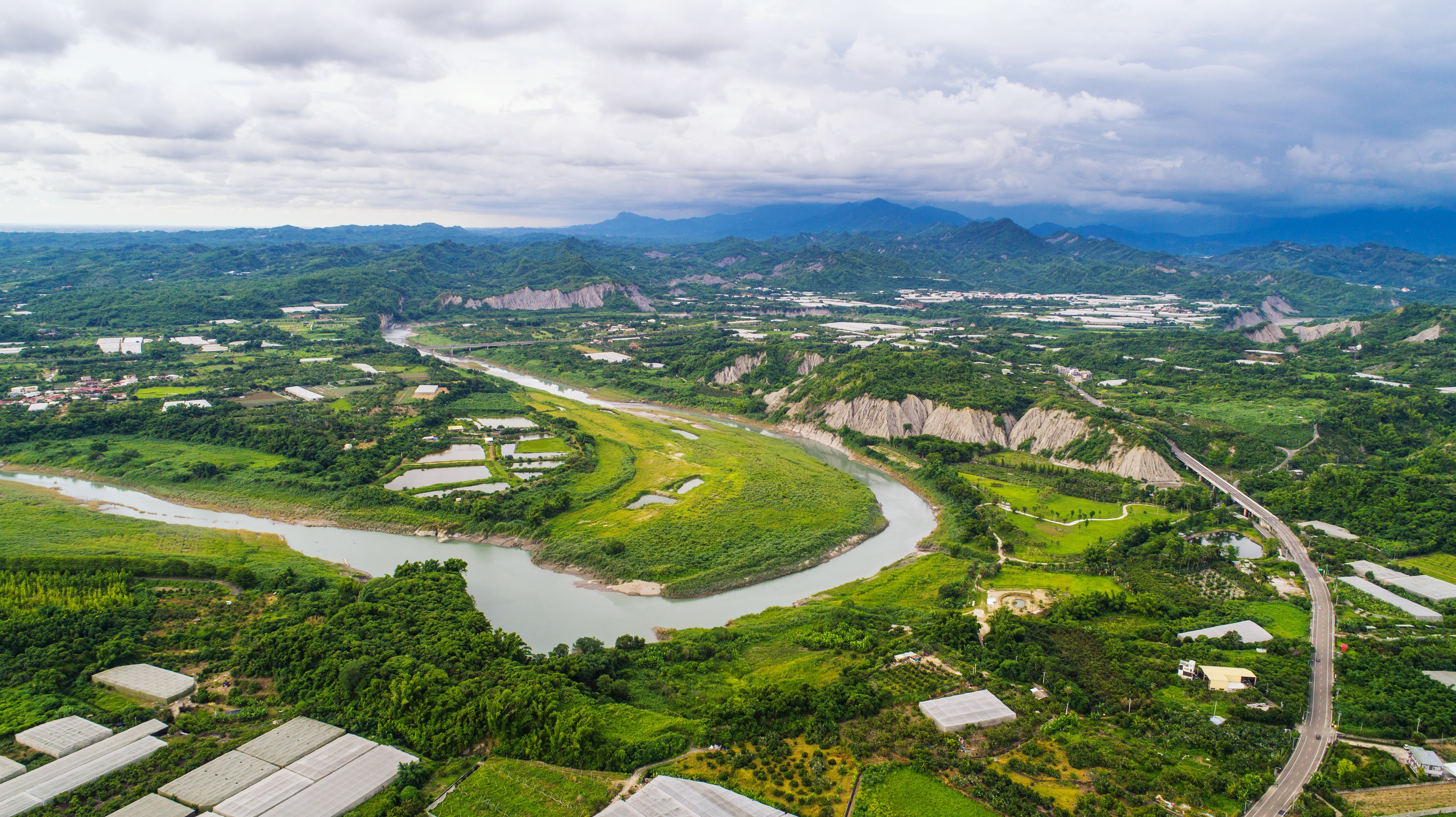

- Danei District in Tainan City
- Location: Tainan, Taiwan

Area
  - Total: 70 km^{2} (27 sq mi)

Population (May 2022)
  - Total: 8,948
  - Density: 130/km^{2} (330/sq mi)
- Website: daneidanei.tainan.gov.tw/en/

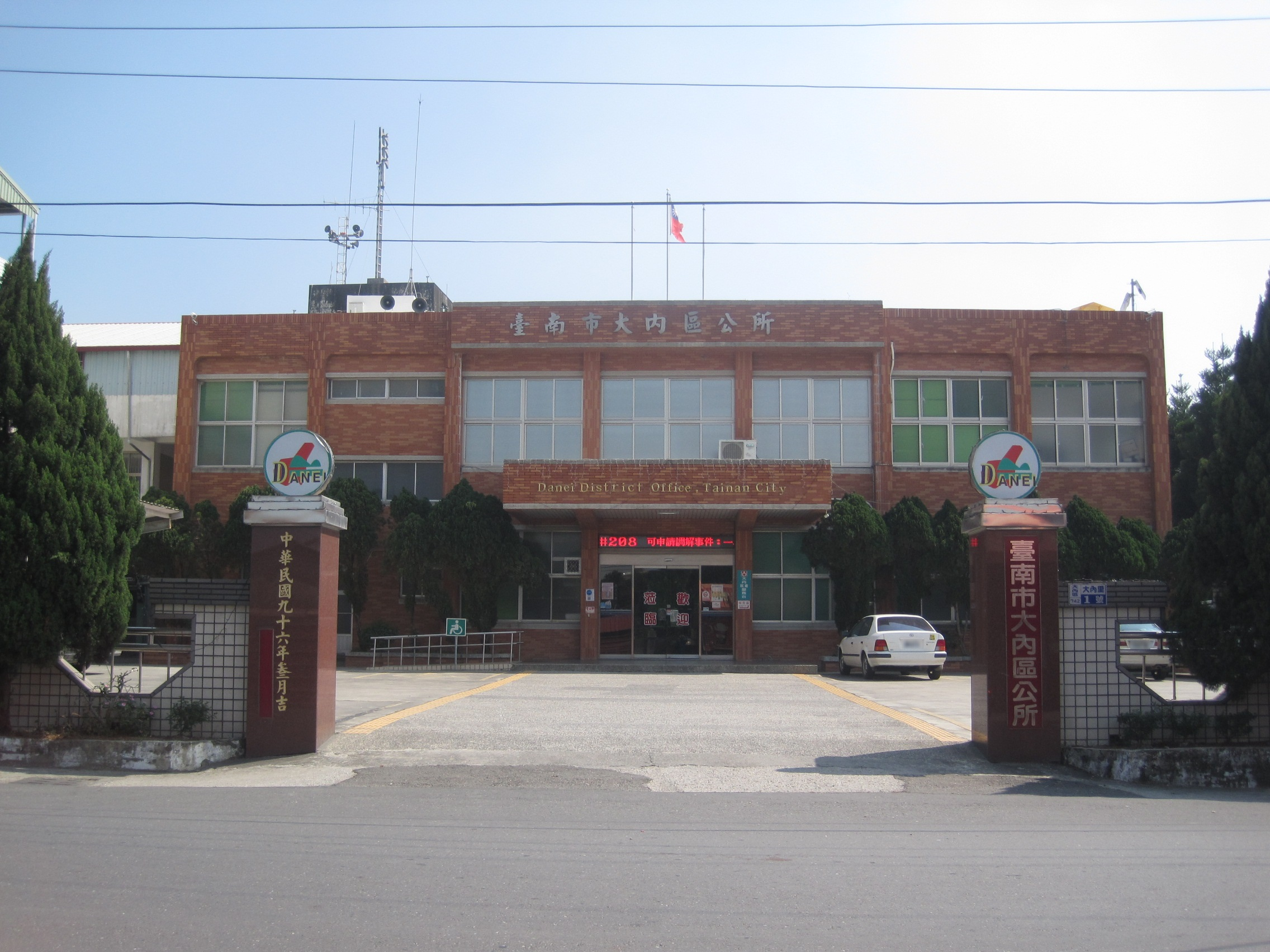
Danei District Cffice

Danei District (Chinese: 大內區; pinyin: Dànèi Qū; Wade–Giles: Ta^{4}-nei^{4} Ch'ü^{1}; Pe̍h-ōe-jī: Toā-lāi-khu) is a rural district of about 8,948 residents in Tainan, Taiwan.

== History ==
Formerly home to the Tevorangh Taiwanese Plains Aborigines, a branch of the Siraya people (Baccloangh subtribe). In 1920, the area was designated Ōuchi Village (大内庄), Sobun District (曽文郡), Tainan Prefecture.

After the handover of Taiwan from Japan to the Republic of China in 1945, Danei was organized as a rural township of Tainan County. On 25 December 2010, Tainan County merged with Tainan City and Danei was upgraded to a district of the city.

== Administrative divisions ==
The district consists of Shihu, Shilin, Shicheng, Neijiang, Danei, Neiguo, Toushe, Huanhu, Erxi and Quxi Village.

== Tourist attractions ==
- Nanyuan Recreational Farm
- Sanhu Lake
- Siangong Temple
- Tainan Astronomical Education Area
- Tainan Science Education Museum
- Tsou Ma Lai Farm
- World of Water Lilies
- Wushantou Prehistoric Remains
