= 2016 southern Taiwan earthquake =

Deadly earthquake centered north of Pingtung City, Taiwan

2016 Taiwan earthquake
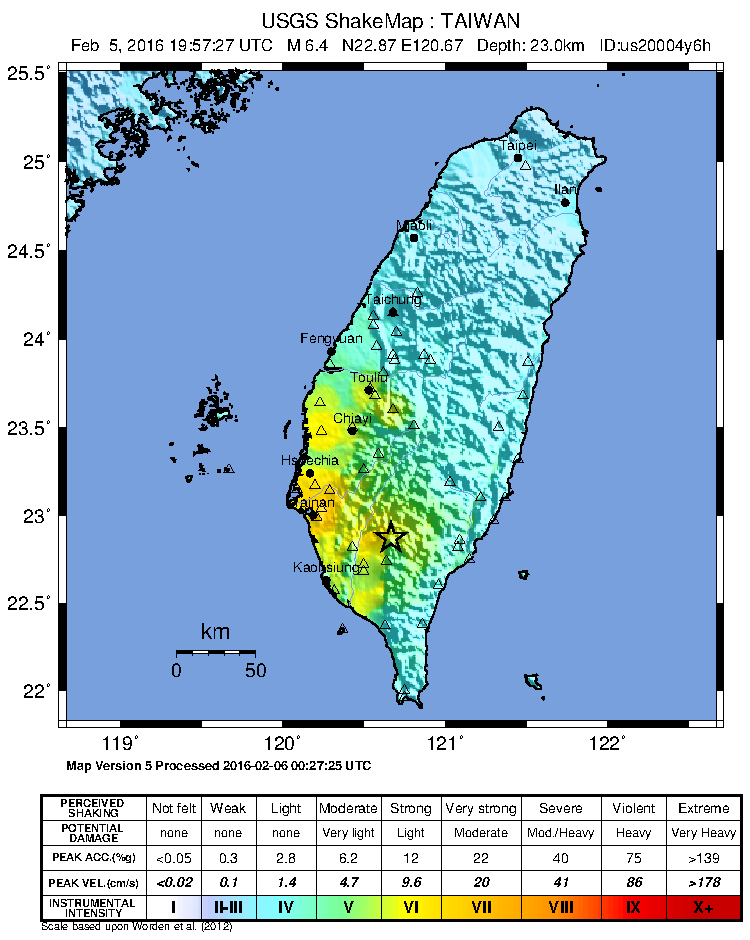

- UTC time: 2016-02-05 19:57:27
- ISC event: 611838796
- USGS-ANSS: ComCat
- Local date: 6 February 2016
- Local time: 03:57:27 (UTC+8)
- Magnitude: 6.4 M_{w}
- Depth: 23.0 km (14.3 mi)
- Epicenter: 22.94°N 120.59°E
- Areas affected: Republic of China (Taiwan)
- Max. intensity: CWA 7 (MMI VII)
- Peak acceleration: 0.4 g
- Peak velocity: 38.99 cm/s
- Casualties: 117 dead 550 injured

At 03:57 local time on 6 February 2016, an earthquake with a moment magnitude of 6.4 struck 28 km (17 mi) northeast of Pingtung City in southern Taiwan, in the Meinong District of Kaohsiung. The earthquake struck at a depth of around 23 km (14 mi). Its comparatively shallow depth caused more intense reverberations on the surface. The earthquake had a maximum intensity of 7 on the Central Weather Administration seismic intensity scale, causing widespread damage and 117 deaths. Almost all of the deaths were caused by a collapsed residential building, named Weiguan Jinlong in Yongkang District, while two other people were killed in Gueiren District. Sixty-eight aftershocks have occurred. The earthquake was the deadliest earthquake in Taiwan since the 1999 Jiji earthquake.

== Geology ==
Taiwan is located on the Ring of Fire, making it prone to intense earthquakes. However, the February 2016 event was particularly destructive and deadly.

Taiwan lies on the boundary between the Eurasian plate and the Philippine Sea plate, which are converging at 80 mm per year. The island is the result of uplift caused by the collision between the northern end of the Luzon Arc and the continental margin of China. The earthquake's focal mechanism indicates oblique thrust faulting in the mid to upper crust.

The earthquake's epicenter was in the Meinong District in Kaohsiung City. The earthquake waves traveled northwest from the epicenter to Tainan City through the soft soil in the Chianan Plain. Due to the soft soil nature of Tainan, surface ground motion due to the traveling wave was strongly amplified, thus creating more devastating effects in Tainan. The earthquake registered a maximum intensity of 7 on the Central Weather Administration seismic intensity scale.

== Damage ==
The worst affected city was Tainan, where numerous buildings reportedly collapsed, including at least one 17-story residential building in Yongkang District, with hundreds of people trapped in the collapsed buildings. 115 people died inside the Weiguan Jinlong building (zh) in Tainan City, including a six-month-old infant who died a few hours later in a hospital. Officials reported that 397 people were rescued, with 104 of them taken to a hospital. More than 500 people in total were injured from a disaster that struck during the most important family holiday in the Chinese calendar – the Lunar New Year holiday.

A total of 34 historical buildings around Taiwan were damaged, in which 23 of them are located in Tainan. Public Work Bureau of Kaohsiung City Government discovered 314 broken bridges in the city and 5 of them deemed unusable anymore.

Taiwan Power Company initially reported that 168,000 households experienced power outage after the quake, but since then has restored the electricity to most of the houses. National Fire Agency reported that about 400,000 households were left without water supply.

Taiwan High Speed Rail (THSR) cancelled all train services between Taichung Station and Zuoying Station starting Saturday due to damage to the train power systems and extensive damage to its tracks north of Tainan. Later in the day, THSR made an announcement that the service between Taichung and Chiayi Station resumed after successful repair works.

Taiwan Semiconductor Manufacturing Company reported that the silicon wafers at its Tainan factory were damaged, although it did not affect much of its shipment. United Microelectronics Corporation said that the earthquake triggered its plant safety measures to shut down the machines and that they would need recalibrating afterwards.

== Disaster response ==
=== Rescue efforts ===
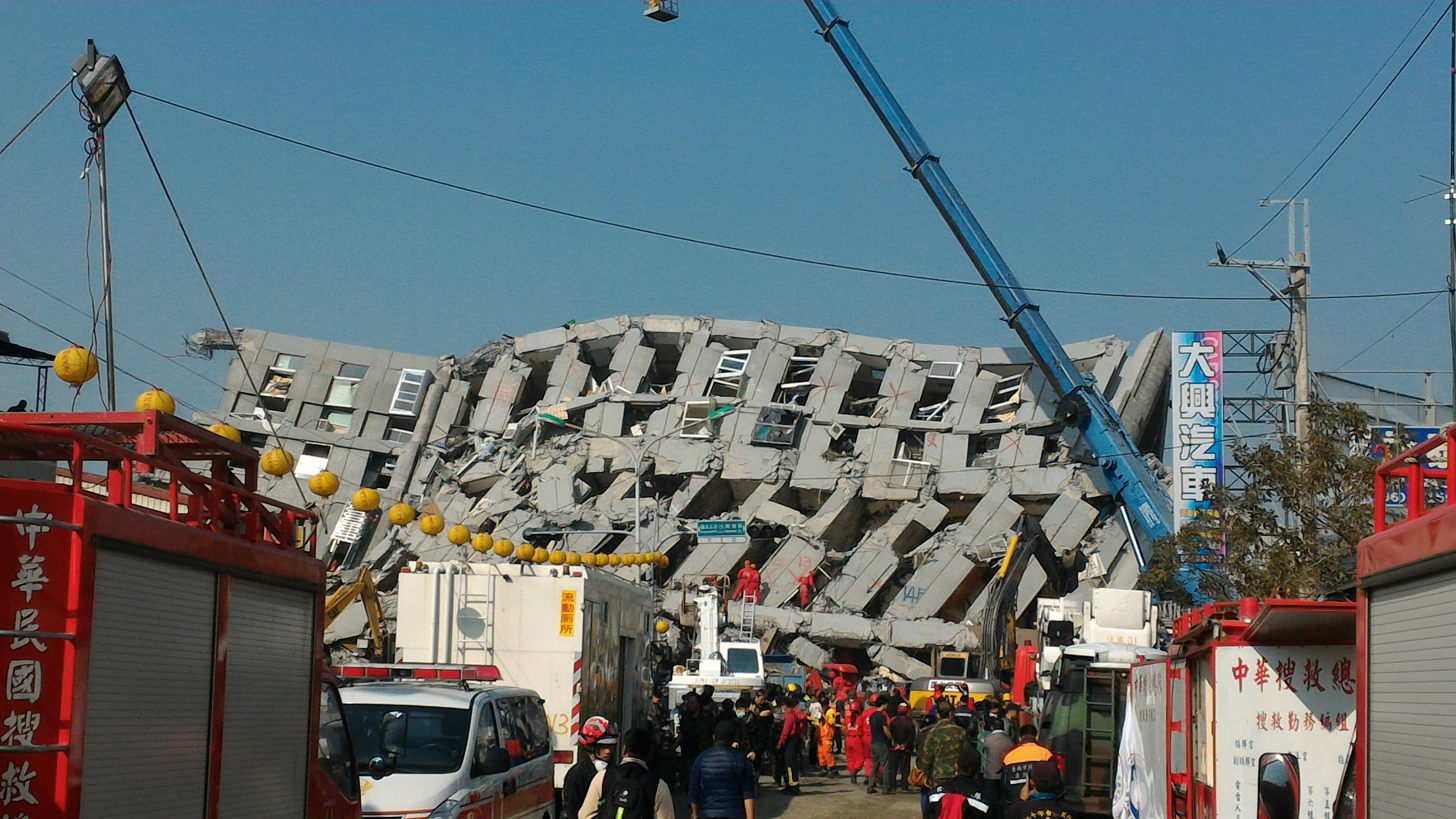
The collapsed 17-story Weiguan Jinlong residential building at 23.005433°N 120.2603917°E in Yongkang District, Tainan.

The Ministry of the Interior immediately set up the Central Emergency Operation Center (CEOC) shortly after 4 a.m. once the earthquake had occurred. From the CEOC, President Ma Ying-jeou coordinated the rescue efforts and is expected to head to Tainan. Tainan Mayor William Lai also set up emergency response minutes after the quake. Premier Chang San-cheng has cancelled his original itinerary and is expected to head to Tainan as well. The Ministry of Health and Welfare had launched six regional emergency operation centers. The last survivors, a woman and her niece, were found 60 hours after the earthquake.

Ministry of National Defense confirmed that army units were dispatched for the rescue efforts consisting of 810 personnel, 11 medical teams, 24 search and rescue teams and 38 vehicles. The Army Command Headquarters in Gueiren District sent two helicopters to survey the damaged areas. Kaohsiung Armed Forces General Hospital dispatched 30 medical personnel to Tainan. Gen. Yen Teh-fa, Armed Forces Chief of the General Staff, was planned to be stationed at the joint military operations command center to oversee the rescue efforts. A total of 1,200 beds in four locations were prepared by the military for people who lost their homes due to the earthquake. Tainan Air Force Base had been turned into a temporary shelter that could accommodate up to 1,400 people left homeless by the quake.

Rescue teams from Japan and People's Republic of China provided advice on the search and rescue efforts. Rescuers used sensors to detect signs of life and avoided using heavy machinery for fear of further collapsing the rubble and potentially trapping any survivors. On 13 February 2016, Tainan Mayor William Lai declared the search and rescue mission for the earthquake victims was over.

=== Reactions ===
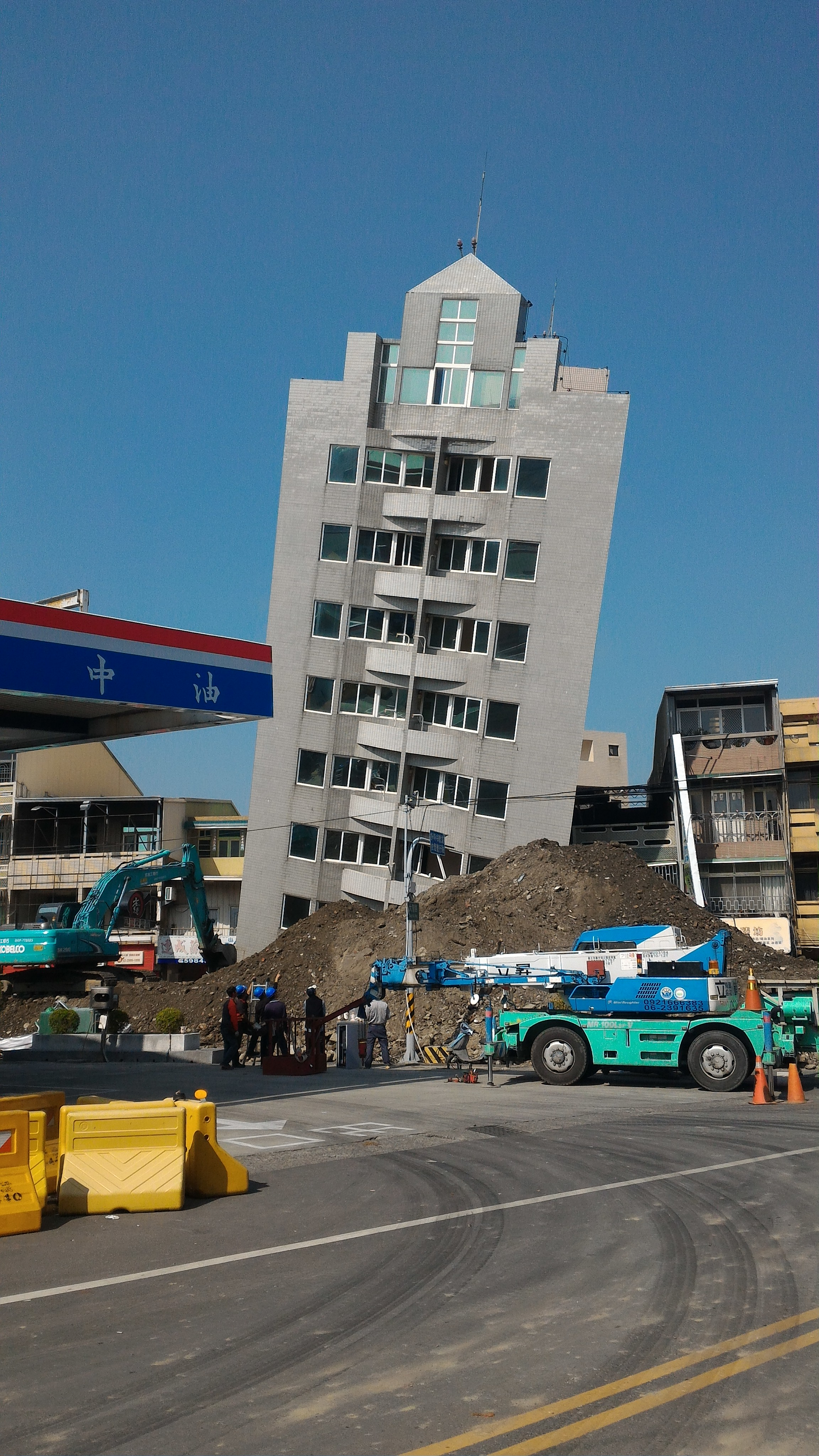
Hsinhua branch of King's Town Bank

Taipei 101 put on a lighting display on Saturday night to pay tribute to the earthquake victims. Tennis athletes Chan Yung-jan and Chan Hao-ching dedicated their Fed Cup Asia/Oceania Group I victory to the earthquake victims.

During her visit to Tainan, President-elect Tsai Ing-wen said that safety checks of old buildings and urban renewal will be the top priority of her administration, later stating that Taiwan has become a developed society that demands improved public infrastructure and better quality of life. When meeting with the quake victims treated at hospital, Tsai promised that rescue efforts will continue and that rescue teams will not give up hope.

==== Donations ====
To assist with post-earthquake relief and reconstruction efforts, Japan donated US$1 million, United States pledged US$500,000, and China donated 2 million yuan (approx. 310077.52 USD).

Tsai Ing-wen donated NT$1 million to the earthquake relief efforts. New Taipei Mayor Eric Chu also donated NT$1 million to earthquake victims. Changhua County Magistrate Wei Ming-ku donated one month of his salary to the earthquake victims.

Yulon Group pledged NT$10 million while Acer donated NT$1 million. Foxconn and Yunglin Healthcare Foundation donated NT$100 million each. Lin Rung San Foundation of Culture and Social Welfare pledged NT$100 million for the victims. Formosa Plastics Corp pledged NT$50 million to help the rescue efforts. Taishin Financial Holdings and Himax each pledged NT$10 million to the Tainan City Government.

Buddhist Compassion Relief Tzu Chi Foundation sent more than 1,000 volunteers to 15 locations in Tainan with blankets, winter bedding, clothes and food for the earthquake survivors. Taiwan's Red Cross Society mobilized more than 100 employees and volunteers to help with the relief efforts, while the Red Cross Society of China and Macau Red Cross have pledged US$303,030 and US$50,000 respectively. In addition, some Taiwanese and foreign celebrities, like Jay Chou or Huang Xiaoming, donated to the relief efforts.

Hotels around Tainan provided temporary free rooms for earthquake survivors to stay in. Restaurant owners setup temporary kitchens to provide hot foods for rescue workers and relatives of the people who are still trapped under the building rubble. Heating pads and hand warmers were also distributed to the traffic police around the collapsed building.

== Aftermath ==
=== Reconstruction ===
The government allocated NT$25 billion for the reconstruction after the damaged caused by the earthquake. The government will also provide rent assistance and banks will provide interest-free long-term loans. The government will also release report on land around Taiwan affected by soil liquefaction and submersion.

=== Criminal investigation ===
Reuters reported that witnesses saw large rectangular cooking-oil cans packed inside wall cavities of the collapsed apartment building, apparently having been used as building material, while Taiwan media reported the presence of polystyrene in supporting beams, mixed in with concrete.

== See also ==
- List of earthquakes in 2016
- List of earthquakes in Taiwan
- 2010 Kaohsiung earthquake
- 2025 Tainan–Chiayi earthquake
