= Central Weather Administration =

Meteorological service of the Republic of China (Taiwan)

- 交通部中央氣象署

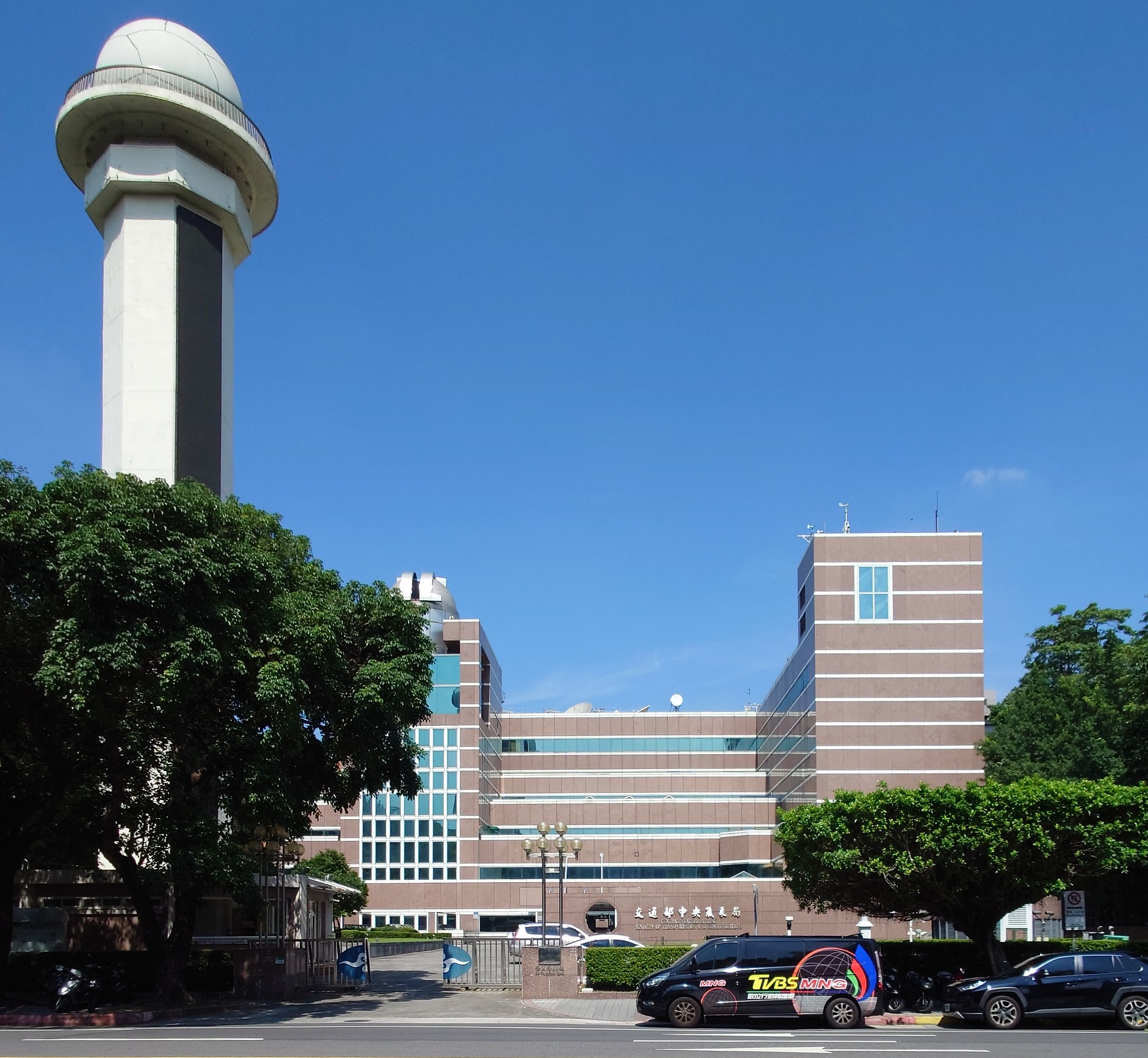
- CWA headquarters in Taipei

Agency overview
- Formed: 1941 (CWB); 2023 (CWA)
- Preceding agency: Central Weather Bureau
- Jurisdiction: Republic of China
- Headquarters: Chongqing (1941–1949); Taipei, Taiwan (1949-)
- Agency executive: Cheng, Chia-Ping (程家平), administrator
- Parent agency: Ministry of Transportation and Communications
- Website: www.cwa.gov.tw

The Central Weather Administration (CWA; Chinese: 交通部中央氣象署; pinyin: Jiāotōng Bù Zhōngyāng Qìxiàng Shǔ) is the government meteorological research and forecasting institution of Taiwan (the Republic of China). In addition to meteorology, the Central Weather Administration also makes astronomical observations, reports on sea conditions, and conducts research into seismology and provides earthquake reports. The Central Weather Administration is headquartered in Taipei City and is administered under the Ministry of Transportation and Communications.

== History ==
While Taiwan was under Japanese rule, the government set up five weather monitoring stations on the island, located in Taipei, Taichung, Tainan, Hengchun, and Penghu. On 19 December 1897, the Taipei Observatory moved to the location presently occupied by the Central Weather Administration. In 1945 when the Kuomintang took control of Taiwan the various stations set up by the Japanese were incorporated into the new Taiwan Provincial Weather Institution, under the Chief Executive of Taiwan Province, Chen Yi. When the position of chief executive was abolished in 1947 (the new head of local government being the Governor of Taiwan Province) the institution became an agency of the Taiwan Provincial Government.

The Central Weather Bureau (CWB) itself was established in 1941 in Chongqing under the Executive Yuan of the Republic of China. In 1947 (and again from 1971 onwards) it was reassigned to the Ministry of Transportation and Communications. After the Kuomintang defeat in the Chinese Civil War and their subsequent flight to Taiwan in 1949, the Central Weather Bureau relocated from Mainland China to Taiwan. From 1958 onwards the Taiwan Provincial Weather Institution assumed responsibility for most of its functions. In 1971 the Central Weather Bureau was reestablished under the Ministry of Transportation and Communications. The bureau was reorganized as the Central Weather Administration on September 15, 2023, as provided by the Organization Act promulgated on June 7.

== Departments ==
The Central Weather Administration has a number of responsibilities, represented by the various departments.

=== Weather Forecast Center ===
The Weather Forecast Center (Chinese: 氣象預報中心; pinyin: Qìxiàng Yùbào Zhōngxīn) is the department responsible for monitoring actual weather conditions and making short and medium term forecasts concerning the weather. It also issues severe weather advisories for conditions including heavy rain, cold snaps, typhoons and storms, and dense fog. In the case of typhoons, the department closely monitors all tropical storms which might impact the island and issues warnings and predicted typhoon path and severity based on the collected data.

=== Seismological Center ===
The Seismological Center (Chinese: 地震測報中心; pinyin: Dìzhèn Cèbào Zhōngxīn) of the Central Weather Administration was founded in 1989, with a mission to monitor seismic activity in and around the island, publish reports on significant earthquakes, study earthquake precursor phenomena, issue tsunami warnings where appropriate, and provide information to the public of earthquake precautions. Taiwan is in a seismically active region on the Pacific Ring of Fire, with 44 deadly earthquakes occurring there during the twentieth century. The center has 150 seismological monitoring stations through Taiwan, Penghu, Kinmen (Quemoy) and Matsu.

==== Marine Cable Hosted Observatory ====
The Marine Cable Hosted Observatory (MACHO) is a system of underwater sensors connected by fiber optic cable. A 620-km system strung between Yilan and Pingtung. MACHO allows a 10-second warning before a quake and 20-30 minutes warning of a subsequent tsunami. An 800-km system is under construction to monitor the Mariana Trench which is expected to be completed in 2024.

=== Marine Meteorology Center ===
The Marine Meteorology Center (Chinese: 海象測報中心; pinyin: Hǎixiàng Cèbào Zhōngxīn) was established in 1993 to monitor sea conditions and make predictions about weather at sea for shipping, fisheries, tourism and other interested parties. Variables including wave height, tides, sea level variations, sea surface temperature, and ocean currents are measured to provide an accurate picture of current conditions. The center is also responsible for informing the public of tide times, and cooperates with local tourism bureaux and Fishermen's Associations to erect electronic billboards in harbours to inform seafarers of ocean conditions.

=== Other departments ===
The administration also includes the following departments:

- The Meteorological Satellite Center (Chinese: 氣象衛星中心; pinyin: Qìxiàng Wèixīng Zhōngxīn), which receives and analyses weather satellite data for observation and prediction purposes.
- The Astronomical Observatory (Chinese: 天文站; pinyin: Tiānwén Zhàn), which not only observes astronomical phenomena such as sunspots and eclipses, but also publishes an annual almanac and provides information on astronomy to the public.

== Transportation ==
The CWA building is accessible within walking distance south of NTU Hospital Station of the Taipei Metro.

== Supercomputing ==
A research supercomputer shared between the Central Weather Administration and CAA was listed by TOP500 as the world's 313th most powerful computer in 2002, obtaining 0.2 TFlop/s with 25 300MHz cores.

In February 2024 the CWA inaugurated a new computer weather forecasting system, based on Fujitsu FX1000 high speed computers. Aggregate system performance is 10 petaflops. The more advanced system improved typhoon and major storm forecasting from seven to ten days.

== See also ==
- Ministry of Transportation and Communications (Republic of China)
- Climate of Taiwan
- Former Tainan Weather Observatory
- China Meteorological Administration, whose Public Weather Service Center sees Taiwan as a PRC province and issues forecasts for it
