= Dongshan District, Tainan =

Coordinates: 23°17′0.2″N 120°26′35.6″E

Dongshan 東山區
- District
- Dongshan District
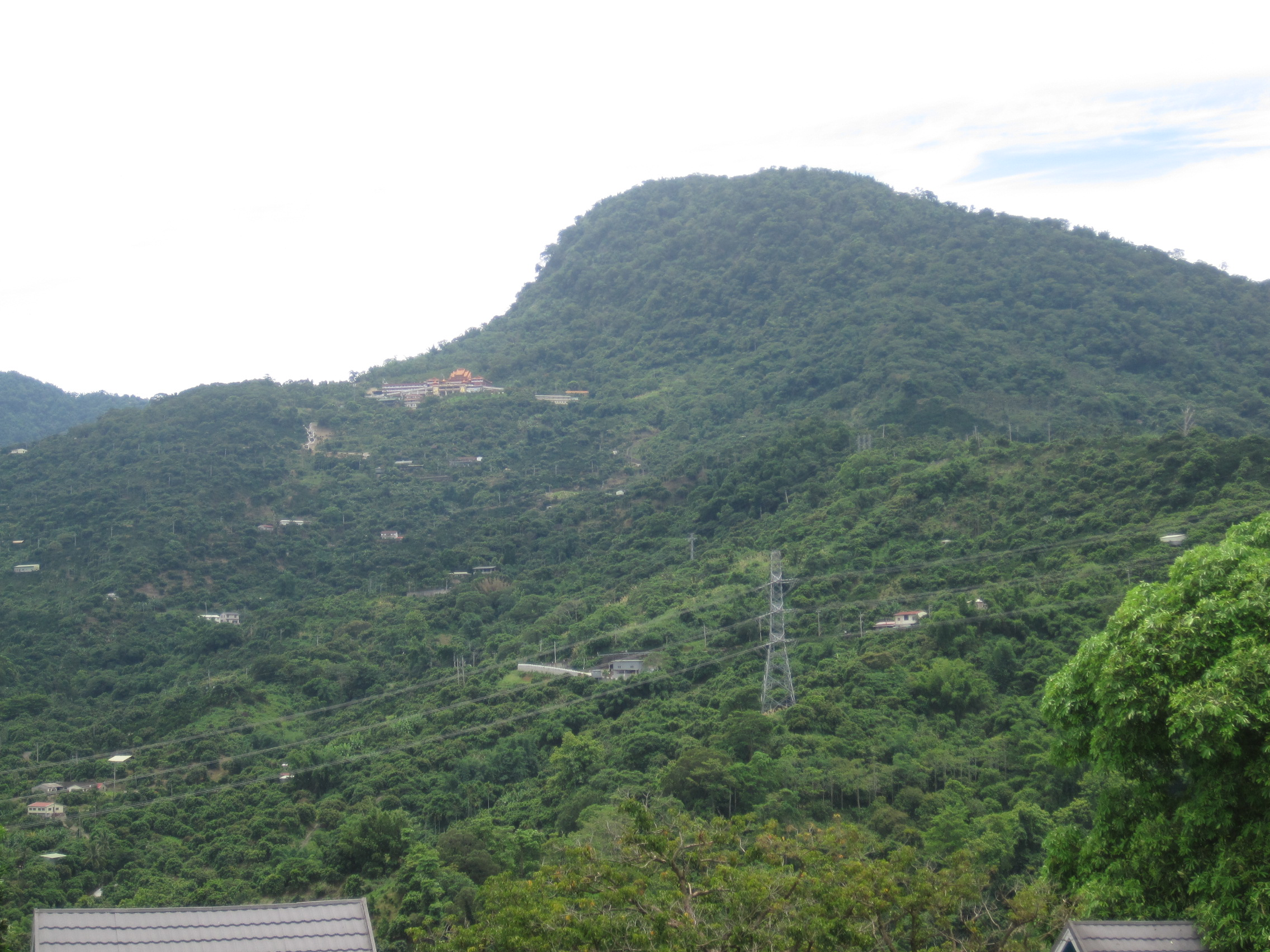
- Mount Kantou in Dongshan District
- Nickname: Hoansia
- Dongshan District in Tainan City
- Country: Taiwan
- Special municipality: Tainan

Area
  - Total: 124.978 km^{2} (48.254 sq mi)

Population (May 2022)
  - Total: 19,560
  - Density: 190.273/km^{2} (492.80/sq mi)
- Time zone: UTC+8 (CST)
- Postal code: 733
- Website: dongshan.tainan.gov.tw/en/

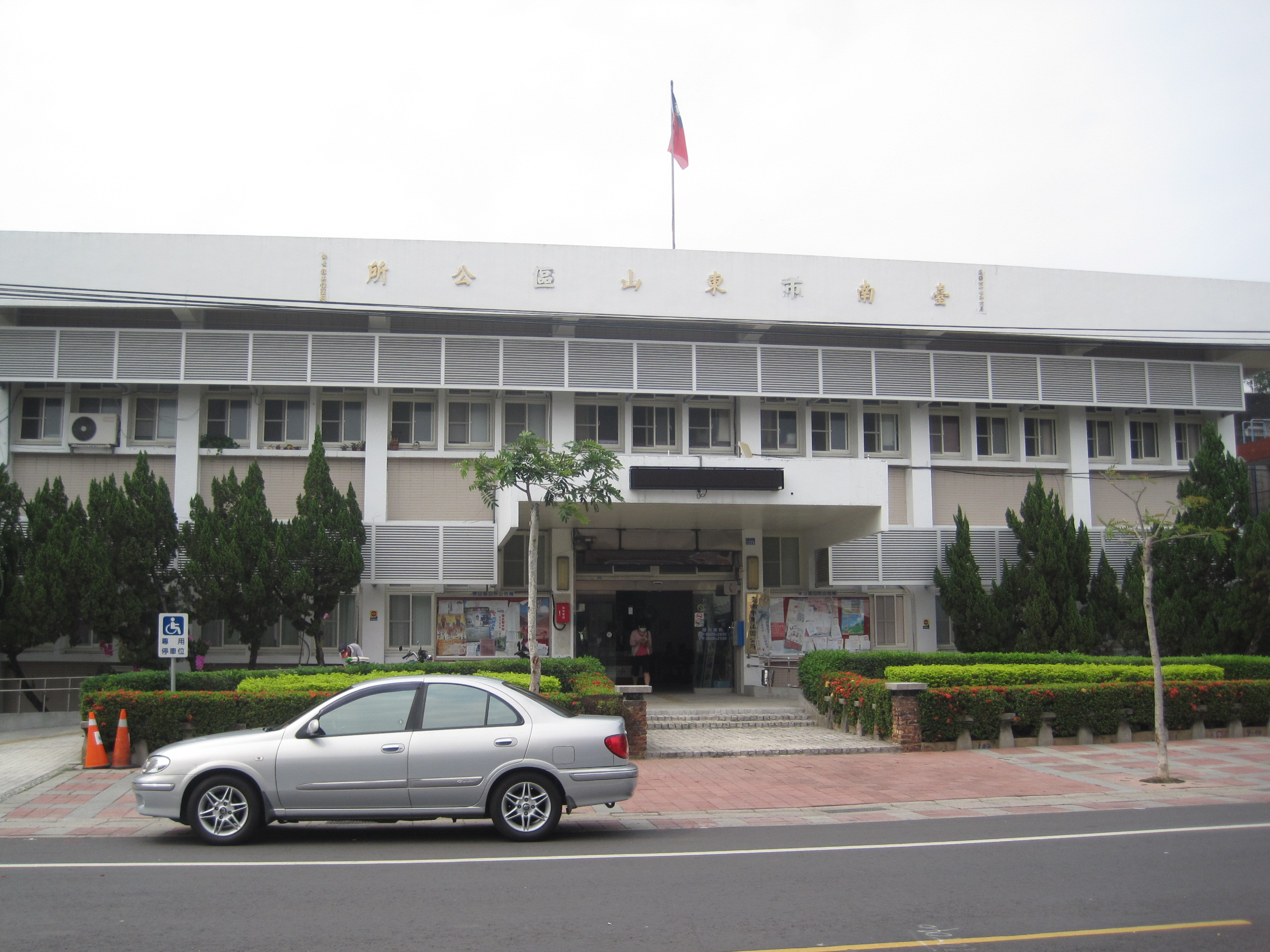
Dongshan District Office

Dongshan District (Chinese: 東山區; pinyin: Dōngshān Qū; Wade–Giles: Tung^{1}-shan^{1} Ch'ü^{1}; Pe̍h-ōe-jī: Tong-san-khu) is a rural district in Tainan, Taiwan. It was formerly called Hoansia (Chinese: 番社; Pe̍h-ōe-jī: hoan-siā).

== History ==
During the Dutch era, the place was known as Dorko, and existed as a township called To-lo-koh in the early 20th century.

After the handover of Taiwan from Japan to the Republic of China in 1945, Dongshan was organized as a rural township of Tainan County. On 25 December 2010, Tainan County merged with Tainan City and Dongshan was upgraded to a district of the city.

== Administrative divisions ==
Dongshan, Dongzhong, Dongzheng, Dake, Sanrong, Keli, Donghe, Shengxian, Nanxi, Shuiyun, Lin’an, Dongyuan, Lingnan, Nanshi, Qingshan and Gaoyuan Villages.

== Economy ==
Dongshan is famous for its coffee crop.

== Tourist attractions ==
- Dongshan Bisuan Temple
- Dongshan Sports Park
- Senwho Holiday Farm
- Shueiyun Village
- Sikou Little Switzerland
- Siraya National Scenic Area

== Notable natives ==
- Su Yu-chang, martial artist, scholar and practitioner of traditional Chinese medicine
