= Taiwan Outstanding Women in Science Awards =

Academic award of Taiwan

- Country: Taiwan
- First award: 2007; 19 years ago
- Website: Taiwan Outstanding Women in Science Awards

The Taiwan Outstanding Women in Science Awards (Chinese: 台灣傑出女科學家獎) is a national level award and it is said to be Taiwan's most prestigious female scientist award. Every year three awards – "Outstanding Award", "Young Talent Award" and "Mong Tsui-Chu Scholarship" are granted to female scientists. The winners are generally announced every March.

== Laureates ==
=== 2008 ===
- Jacqueline Whang-Peng

=== 2009 ===
- Wang Yu
- Shu-Chun Chu

=== 2010 ===
- Yan-Hwa Wu Lee
- Chang Mei-hwei
- Su-Ying Wu
- Shuen-Iu Hung

=== 2011 ===
- Kuo-Fong Ma
- Peichen Yu
- Hsiao-Wen Zan

=== 2012 ===
- Chu-Fang Lo
- Bon-Chu Chung
- Chao-Wen Wang
- Ya-Hui Chi
- Wei-Chien Yuan

=== 2013 ===
- Su-Lan Wang
- Mei-Yin Chou
- Keng-hui Lin
- Shu-Chih Yang
- Yu-Jung Lu

=== 2014 ===
- Yu Su-may
- Chao Agnes Hsiung
- Denise Hsien Wu
- Yun-Ju Chen
- Hsuan-Wen Lin

=== 2015 ===
- Ray-Nien Kwo
- Ya-Ping Chiu
- Ching-Wen Chiu
- Yu-hsuan Huang

=== 2016 ===
- Ruey-Hwa Chen
- Lily Hui-Ching Wang
- Ye-ling Chang
- Li-An Chu

=== 2017 ===
- Li-Chyong Chen
- Ya-Ju Hsu
- Shin-Shan Yu
- Yi-Hui Hsieh

=== 2018 ===
- Yi-Fang Tsay
- Ling Chao
- Han-Ching Wang
- Hsiu-Ju Lin

=== 2019 ===
- Yng-Ing Lee
- Haojia Abby Ren
- Yi-Chia Chou

=== 2020 ===
- Lin-Chao Sue
- Hsiao-Ching Lin
- Yun-Ching Chen
- Chien-Hui Lo

=== 2021 ===
- I-I Lin
- Hsin-Jay Wu
- Yun-Nung Chen
- Tso-Chi Chuang

=== 2022 ===
- Hsou-min Li
- Hsiao-Chun Huang
- Yen-Ping Hsueh
- Tung Chao

=== 2023 ===
- Yu-Ju Chen
- Li-Hwai Lin
- Vita Pi-Ho Hu
- Ni-En Hsieh

=== 2024 ===
- Yu-Ju Sun
- Ming-Jung Liu
- Hsueh-Ping Catherine Chu
- Ming-Chia Chu

=== 2025 ===
- Wanjiun Liao
- Yen-Ting Hwang
- Hsiang-Yi Karen Yang
- Yi-Fan Chen

=== 2026 ===
- Zee-Fen Chang
- Annie Cheng
- Wei-Chien Yuan
- Jui-Yi Chen

== See also ==
- List of science and technology awards for women
- Women in STEM fields
- Women in engineering
- Women in science
