= Chang Mei-hwei =

Taiwanese pediatric hepatologist (born 1949)

Chang Mei-hwei (Chinese: 張美惠; born 1949) is a Taiwanese pediatric hepatologist.

== Career ==
Chang graduated from the National Taiwan University College of Medicine, completed fellowship training in pediatric gastroenterology at UCLA Health, and later returned to Taiwan, subsequently serving as a distinguished chair professor within NTU's Department of Pediatrics. Chang has researched hepatitis B vaccination, biliary atresia in infants, and led the Children's Liver Foundation. She was featured in the 2016 documentary Taiwan Revealed: Medical Elite.

== Honors ==
In 2010, Chang was awarded the Outstanding Award of the Taiwan Outstanding Women in Science Awards.

In 2013, Chang was awarded the TWAS Prize in Medical Science. The following year, she was elected an academician of Academia Sinica. Chang was elected to fellowship within The World Academy of Sciences in 2018.
