= Jiujiufeng =

Nature preserve in central Taiwan

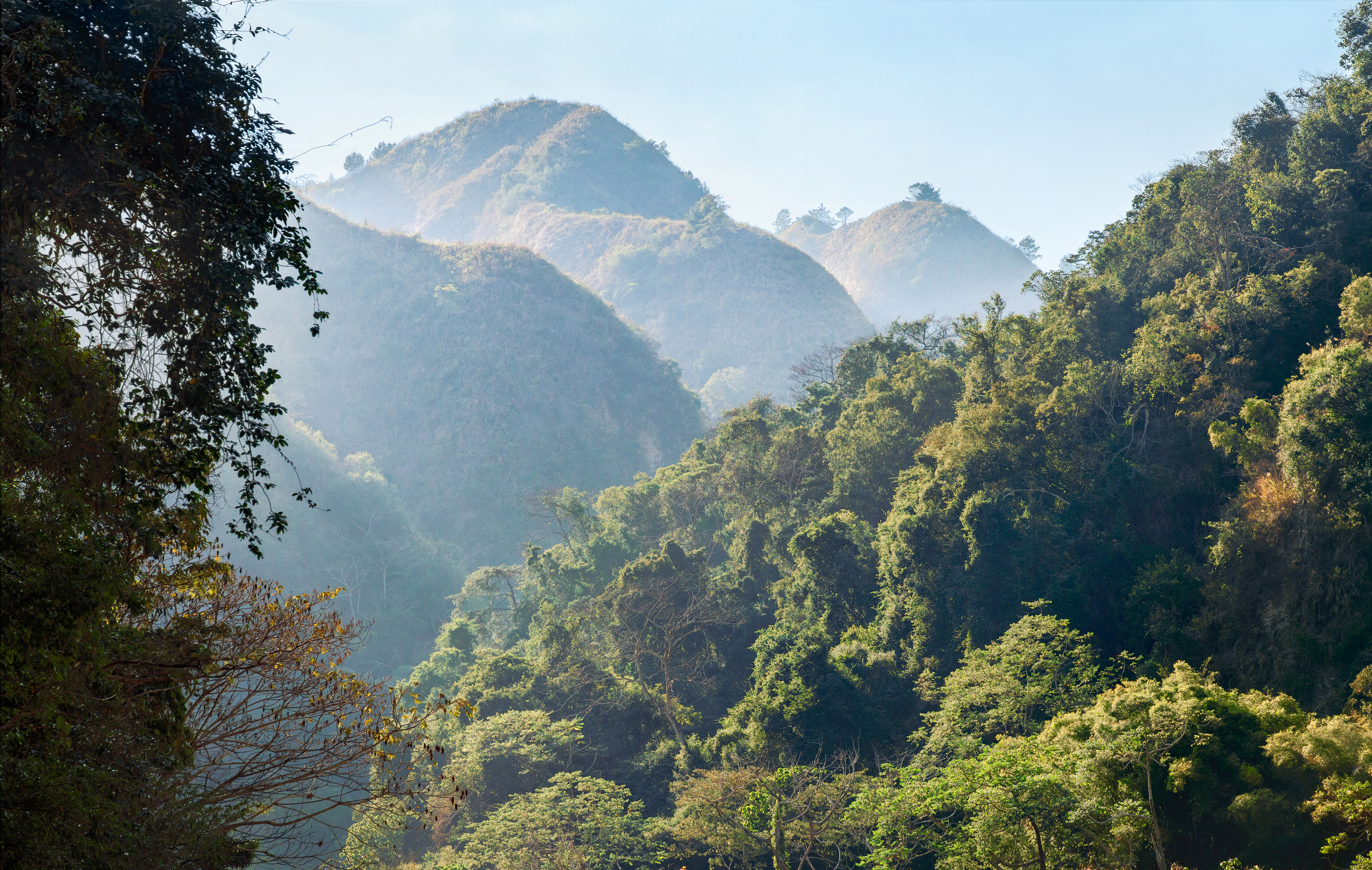
- Main ridge of Jiujiufeng
- Interactive map of Jiujiufeng
- Location: Caotun and Guoxing, Nantou County; Wufeng and Taiping, Taichung City
- Coordinates: 23.9943°N 120.7717°E
- Area: 1,212.81 ha (4.6827 sq mi)
- Designation: Nature reserve
- Created: 22 May 2000
- Governing body: Forestry Bureau

Jiujiufeng (Chinese: 九九峰; pinyin: Jiǔjiǔfēng; lit. 'ninety-nine peaks') is a nature reserve located at the border of Taichung City and Nantou County, spanning the cities of Caotun, Guoxing, Wufeng, and Taiping. The protected area contains many small, jagged peaks, hence the name.

== Description ==
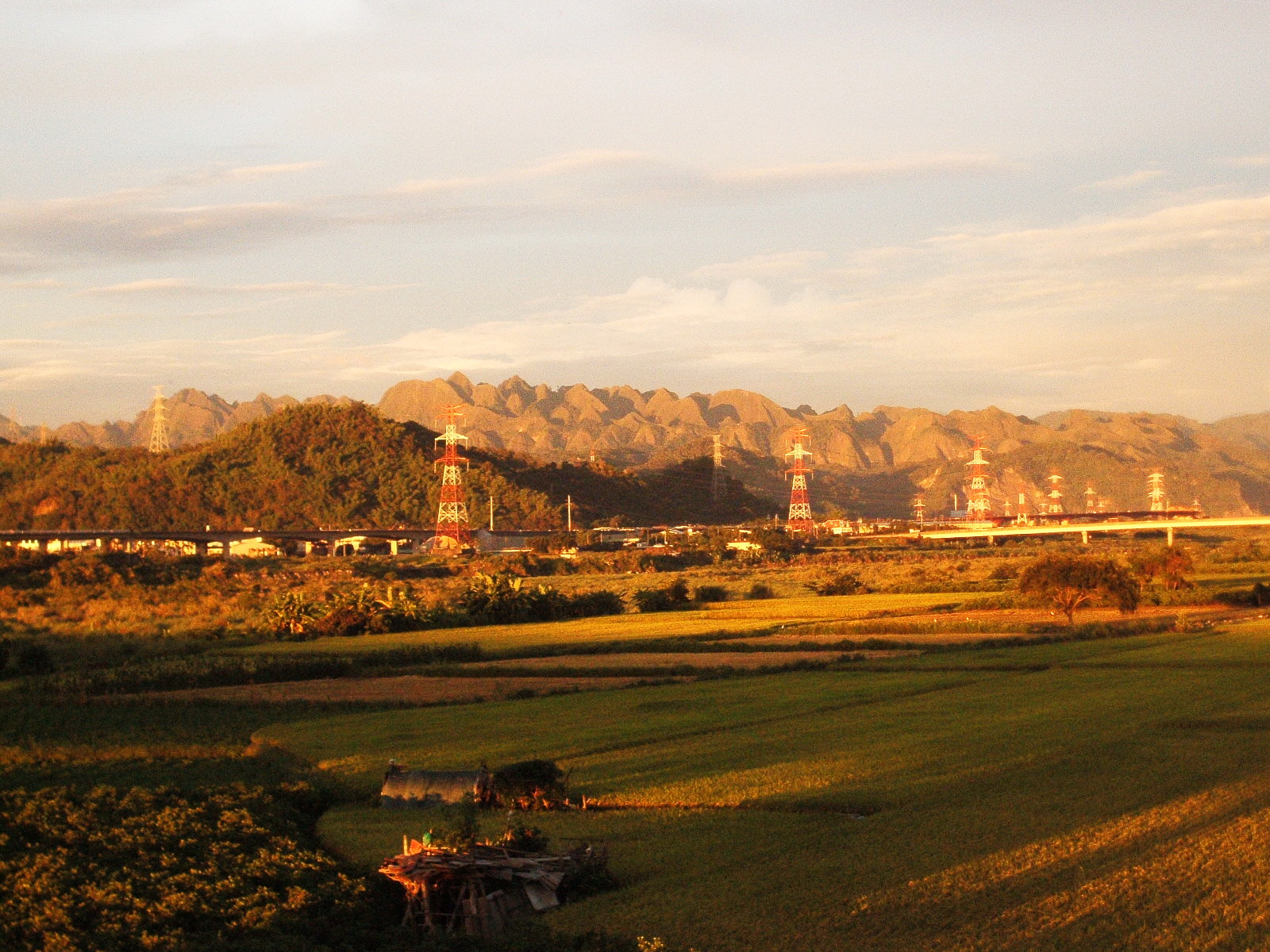
Jiujiufeng during sunset

Jiujiufeng is located on the north bank of the Dadu River southeast of Taichung City. Geologically, Jiujiufeng is located in the Toukoshan Formation (頭嵙山層), a Pleistocene-era formation primarily composed of gravelly rocks. Since the soil has high permeability, the peaks are easily eroded by rainfall to form the jagged peaks. Despite the terrain, Jiujiufeng still sustains a wide array of plant life, including the endemic Begonia bouffordii.

The 1999 Jiji earthquake caused many landslides within Jiujiufeng, which uncovered the red laterite surfaces beneath and destroyed much of the original vegetation. The resulting unique landscape prompted the Forestry Bureau to protect it as a nature preservation area (自然保留區) on 22 May 2000.

== Hiking ==
There is a 1.93 kilometres (1.20 mi) long hiking trail that makes a loop within Jiujiufeng. The trail is accessible from Caotun.

== See also ==
- Huoyan Mountain
