= Huoyan Mountain Ecology Museum =

Museum in Sanyi, Miaoli County, Taiwan

- 火炎山生態教育館
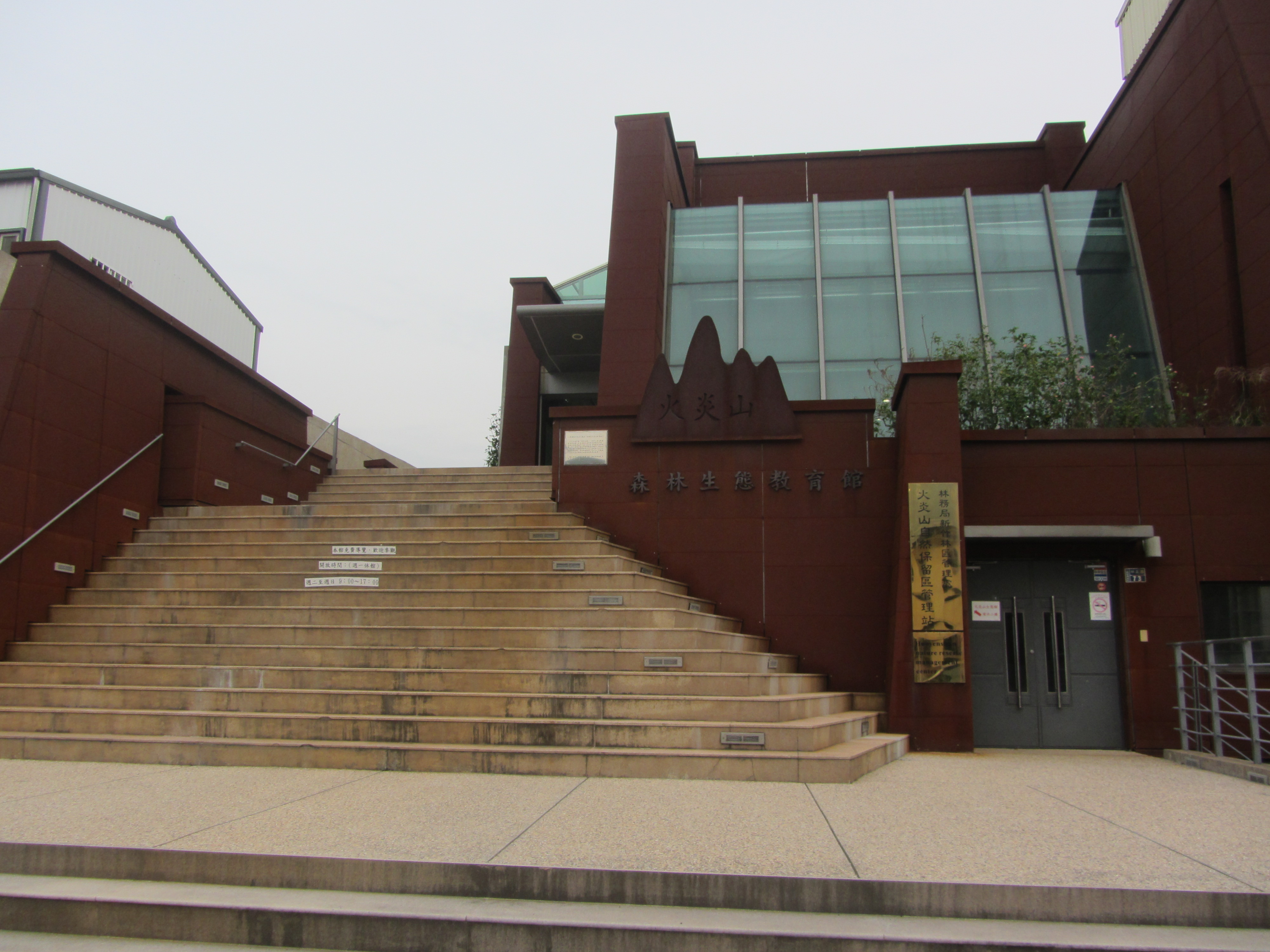
- Location: Sanyi, Miaoli County, Taiwan
- Coordinates: 24°24′54″N 120°46′21″E
- Type: museum
- Owner: Forestry Bureau
- Public transit access: Sanyi Station
- Website: Official website (in Chinese)

The Huoyan Mountain Ecology Museum (traditional Chinese: 火炎山生態教育館; simplified Chinese: 火炎山生态教育馆; pinyin: Huǒyán Shān Shēngtài Jiàoyùguǎn) is a museum of ecology about Huoyan Mountain in Sanyi Township, Miaoli County, Taiwan.

== Transportation ==
The museum is accessible within walking distance south from Sanyi Station of the Taiwan Railway.

== See also ==
- List of museums in Taiwan
