= Li-Chyong Chen =

Taiwanese physicist

- Born: March 12, 1959 (age 67); Taipei, Taiwan
- Education: National Taiwan University (BS); Harvard University (PhD)
- Scientific career
- Fields: Applied physics
- Workplaces: National Taiwan University
- Thesis: Disordered quasicrystal (1989)

Li-Chyong Chen (Chinese: 林麗瓊; pinyin: Lín Lìqióng; born March 12, 1959) is a Taiwanese applied physicist. She is a professor of physics at National Taiwan University, where she is a distinguished research fellow at the Center for Condensed Matter Sciences and the director of the Center of Atomic Initiative for New Materials.

== Early life and education ==
Chen was born in Taipei, Taiwan, on March 12, 1959, the youngest of eight children. Her father was a businessman and her mother was a homemaker. Chen was raised in a suburb of Taipei and graduated from Taipei First Girls' High School.

After high school, Chen graduated from National Taiwan University with a Bachelor of Science (B.S.) in physics in 1981. She then earned her Ph.D. in applied physics from Harvard University in 1989. Her doctoral dissertation, completed under applied scientist Frans Spaepen, was titled, "Disordered quasicrystal". Her graduate professors at Harvard also included materials scientist David Turnbull.

== Academic career ==
After receiving her doctorate, Chen became a superconductor engineer at the superconductor laboratory at General Electric (GE) in 1989. In 1994, she returned to Taiwan and became a professor of physics at National Taiwan University. In 2022, she was elected to the Academia Sinica.

In 2017, Chen was awarded the Outstanding Award of the Taiwan Outstanding Women in Science Awards.

== Personal life ==
Chen is married to Chen Kuei-hsien, a physicist who works for Academia Sinica's Institute of Atomic and Molecular Sciences.
