= 921 Earthquake Museum of Taiwan =

Museum in Wufeng, Taichung, Taiwan

- 國立自然科學博物館九二一地震教育園區
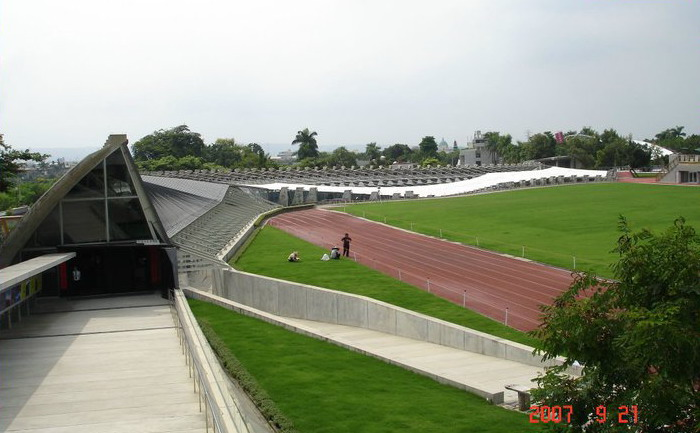
- Former name: Earthquake Memorial Museum
- Established: 13 February 2001
- Location: Wufeng, Taichung, Taiwan
- Coordinates: 24°02′32.1″N 120°41′58.7″E
- Type: Museum
- Website: www.921emt.edu.tw

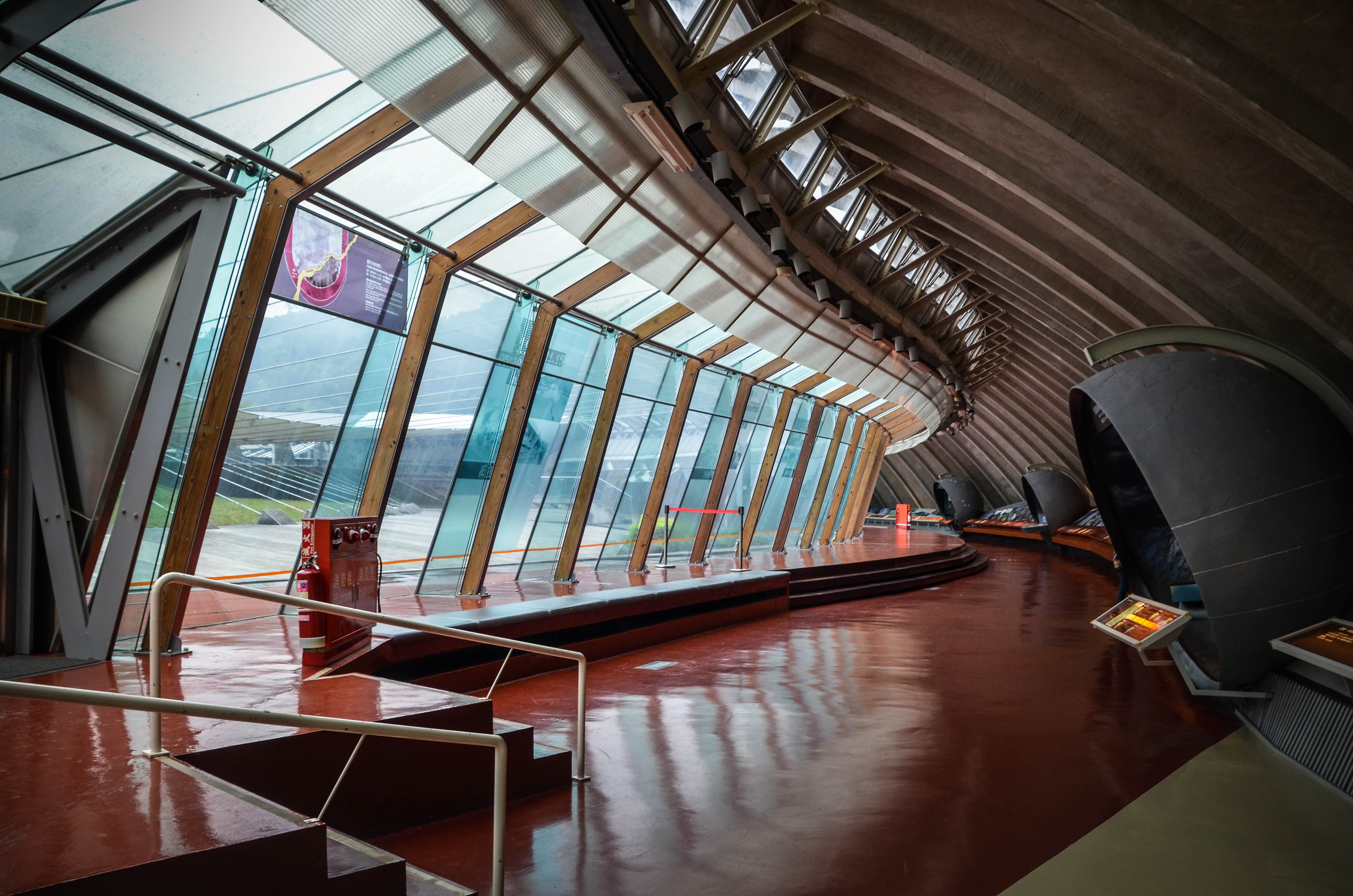
A view of the interior of the Chelungpu Fault Gallery

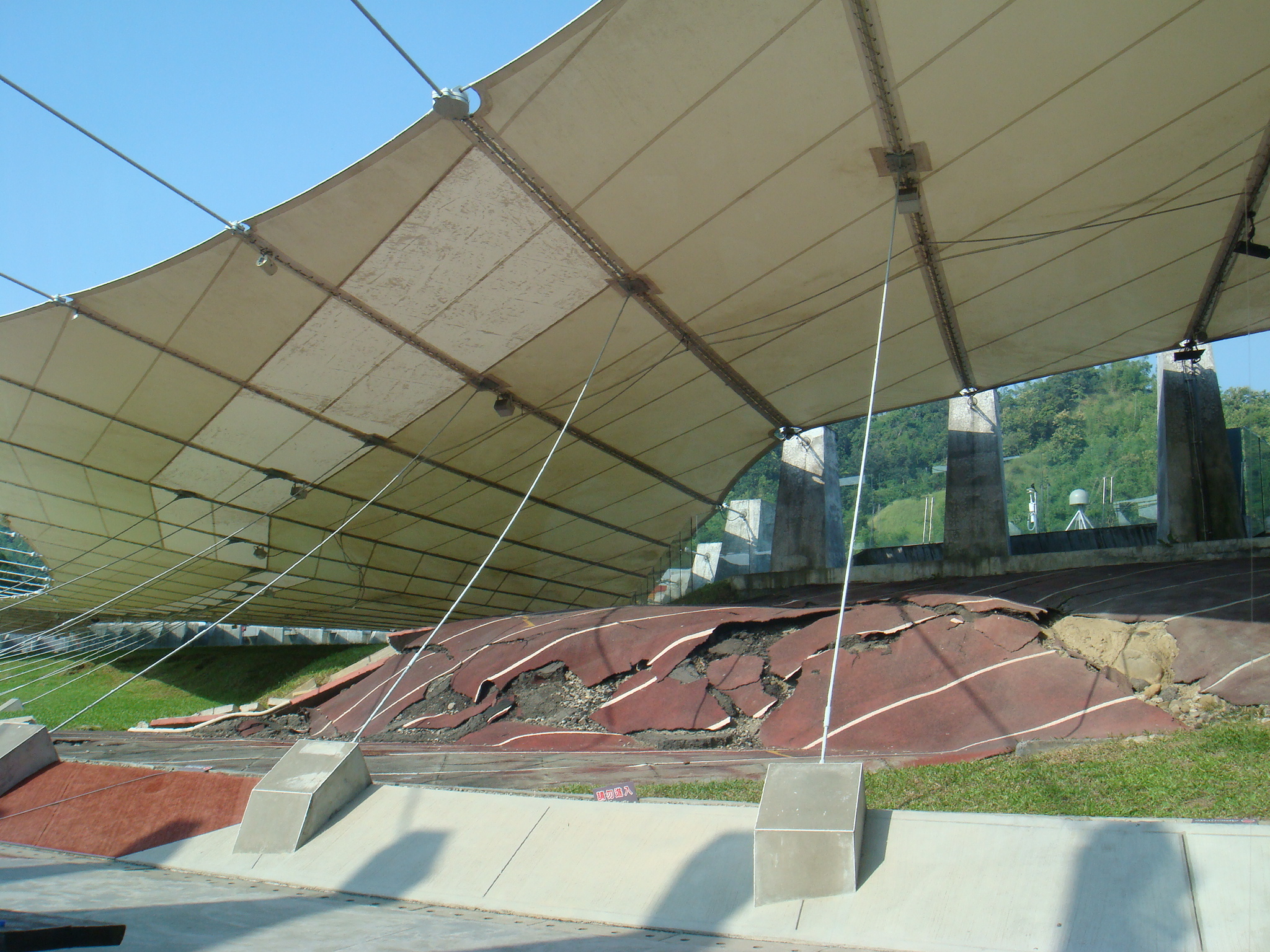
The fault on the sports field of the Guangfu Junior High School

The 921 Earthquake Museum of Taiwan (Chinese: 國立自然科學博物館九二一地震教育園區; pinyin: Guólì Zìrán Kēxué Bówùguǎn Jiǔ'èryī Dìzhèn Jiàoyù Yuánqū) is a national museum in Wufeng District, Taichung, Taiwan. The museum is dedicated to the 7.3 earthquake that struck the center of Taiwan at 01:47:12.6 TST on Tuesday, 21 September 1999.

The museum is located on the site of the former Guangfu Junior High School; the shell of the building forms the exterior walls of the museum and the museum's Chelungpu Fault Gallery crosses the fault on which the earthquake occurred.

== History ==
After the earthquake, the local government decided to preserve some of the remains from the earthquake to serve as reminders to the public for them to be prepared in the future if such event happens again. The museum, previously known as the Earthquake Memorial Museum, opened on Tuesday, 13 February 2001.

== Galleries ==
- Chelungpu Fault Gallery
- Earthquake Engineering Hall
- Image Gallery
- Disaster Prevention Hall
- Reconstruction Records Hall

== Opening time ==
The museum is open every day except Mondays from 9.00 a.m. to 5.00 p.m. for the galleries and 6.00 a.m. to 10.00 p.m. for the outdoor sections.

== See also ==
- List of museums in Taiwan
- National Museum of Natural Science
- Chelungpu Fault Preservation Park
