= Rake receiver =

Radio receiver

A rake receiver is a radio receiver designed to counter the effects of multipath fading. It does this by using several "sub-receivers" called fingers, that is, several correlators each assigned to a different multipath component. Each finger independently decodes a single multipath component; at a later stage the contribution of all fingers are combined in order to make the most use of the different transmission characteristics of each transmission path. This could very well result in higher signal-to-noise ratio (or E_{b}/N_{0}) in a multipath environment than in a "clean" environment.

The multipath channel through which a radio wave transmits can be viewed as transmitting the original (line of sight) wave pulse through a number of multipath components. Multipath components are delayed copies of the original transmitted wave traveling through a different echo path, each with a different magnitude and time-of-arrival at the receiver. Since each component contains the original information, if the magnitude and time-of-arrival (phase) of each component is computed at the receiver (through a process called channel estimation), then all the components can be added coherently to improve the information reliability.

== Mathematical definition ==
A rake receiver utilizes multiple correlators to separately detect the M strongest multipath components. Each correlator output may be quantized using several bits. Demodulation and bit decisions are then based on the weighted outputs of the M correlators, which provide a better estimate of the transmitted signal than is provided by a single component.

== History ==
Rake receivers must have either a general-purpose CPU or some other form of digital signal processing hardware in them to process and correlate the intended signal. Rake receivers only became common after 16-bit CPUs capable of signal processing became widely available. The rake receiver was patented in the US by Robert Price and Paul E. Green in July 1956, (U.S. Pat. No. 2,982,853) but it took until the 1970s to design practical implementations of the receiver.

Radio astronomers were the first substantial users of rake receivers in the late 1960s to mid-1980s as this kind of receiver could scan large sky regions yet not create large volumes of data beyond what most data recorders could handle at the time. Astropulse, which is part of the SETI@Home project, uses a variant of a rake receiver as part of its sky searches—so this kind of receiver is still current for the needs of radio astronomy.

== Use ==
Rake receivers are common in a wide variety of CDMA and W-CDMA radio devices such as mobile phones and wireless LAN equipment.

Rake receivers are also used in radio astronomy. The CSIRO Parkes radio telescope and Jodrell Bank telescope have filter-bank recording formats that can be processed in real time by software-based rake receivers.

In a Flexible rake Receiver, signal reception is performed with a single correlator engine and a stream buffer storing the entire delay spread of baseband input/output (I/O) samples. The primary advantage of the rake receiver is flexible multipath allocation supporting enhanced modularity of the receiver and resource sharing among multiple channel decoders.
