= Huoyan Mountain =

Mountain in Miaoli County, Taiwan

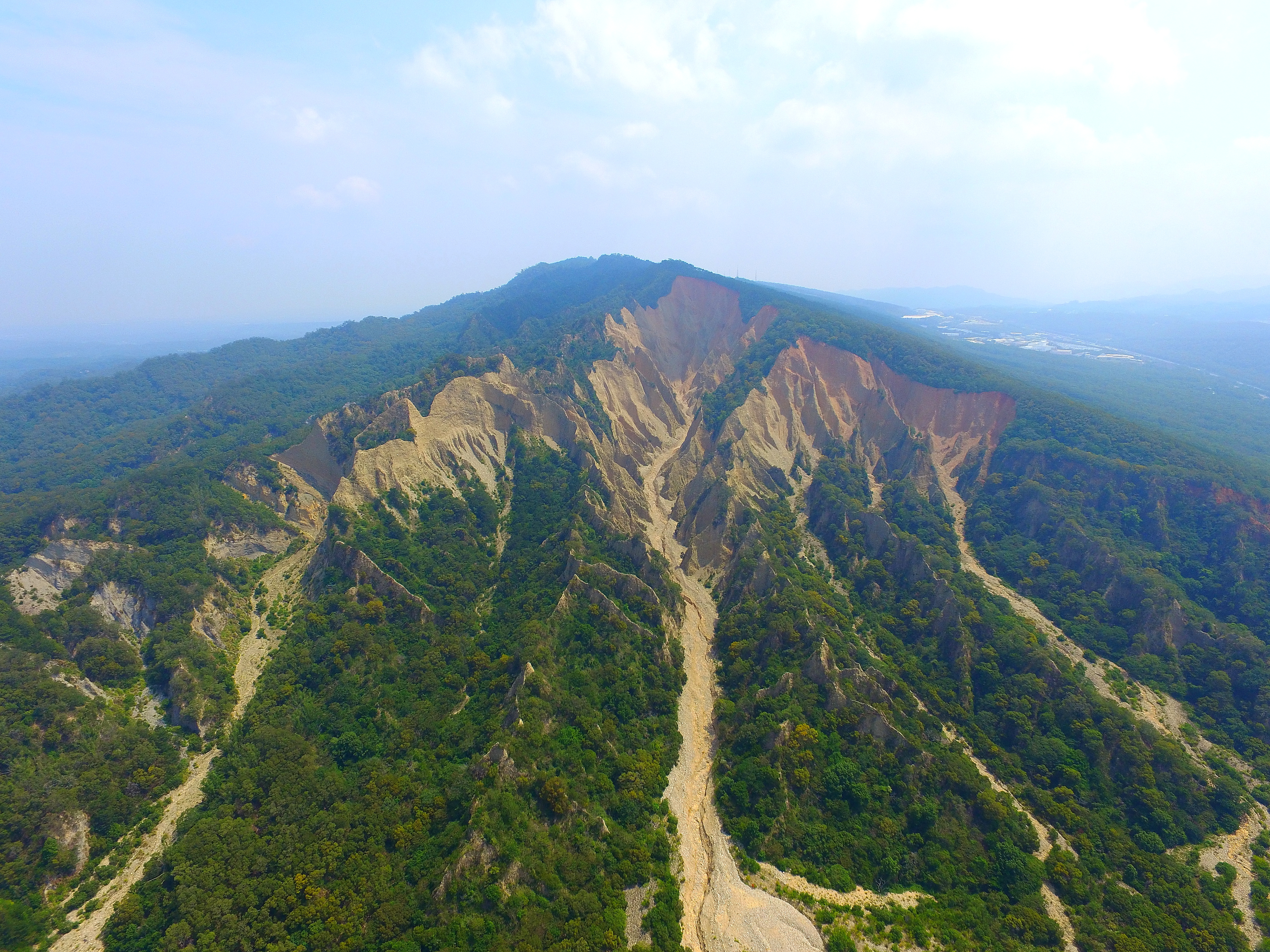
- Aerial view of Huoyan Mountain

Highest point
- Elevation: 596 m (1,955 ft); 614 m (2,014 ft) (north peak)
- Coordinates: 24.3676°N 120.7290°E

Naming
- Native name: 火炎山 (Chinese)
- English translation: Fire mountain

Geography
- Country: Taiwan
- County: Miaoli County
- Township: Sanyi and Yuanli

Huoyan Mountain (Chinese: 火炎山; pinyin: Huǒyánshān; lit. 'fire mountain') is a mountain located at the border of Sanyi and Yuanli Townships in Miaoli County, Taiwan. The mountain is known for its jagged exposed laterite surfaces that look like fire.

== Description ==
Huoyan Mountain is located on the north bank of Da'an River. Geologically, it is part of the Toukeshan Formation (頭嵙山層), a Pleistocene-era formation. The prominent red cliffs on the mountain are due to the tectonic uplift, weak shear strength of the underlying soil, and heavy rainfall. The mountain is protected by the Forestry Bureau to preserve the unique landscape and ecology.

County Highway 140, a major road connecting the coastal regions with the mountainous interior in Miaoli County, passes on the south side of the mountain. In the past, the highway would often be blocked by landslides triggered by heavy rainfall. Therefore, in 2006, a tunnel was built to protect the road from blockages.

== Hiking ==
There are a couple of hiking trails that reach the triangulation point at the summit of Huoyan Mountain. The north peak, slightly higher in elevation, is not reachable by the trails. The mountain is one of the "hundred little mountains" (臺灣小百岳), a list of shorter and accessible mountains promoted by the Sports Administration for recreation.

== Gallery ==
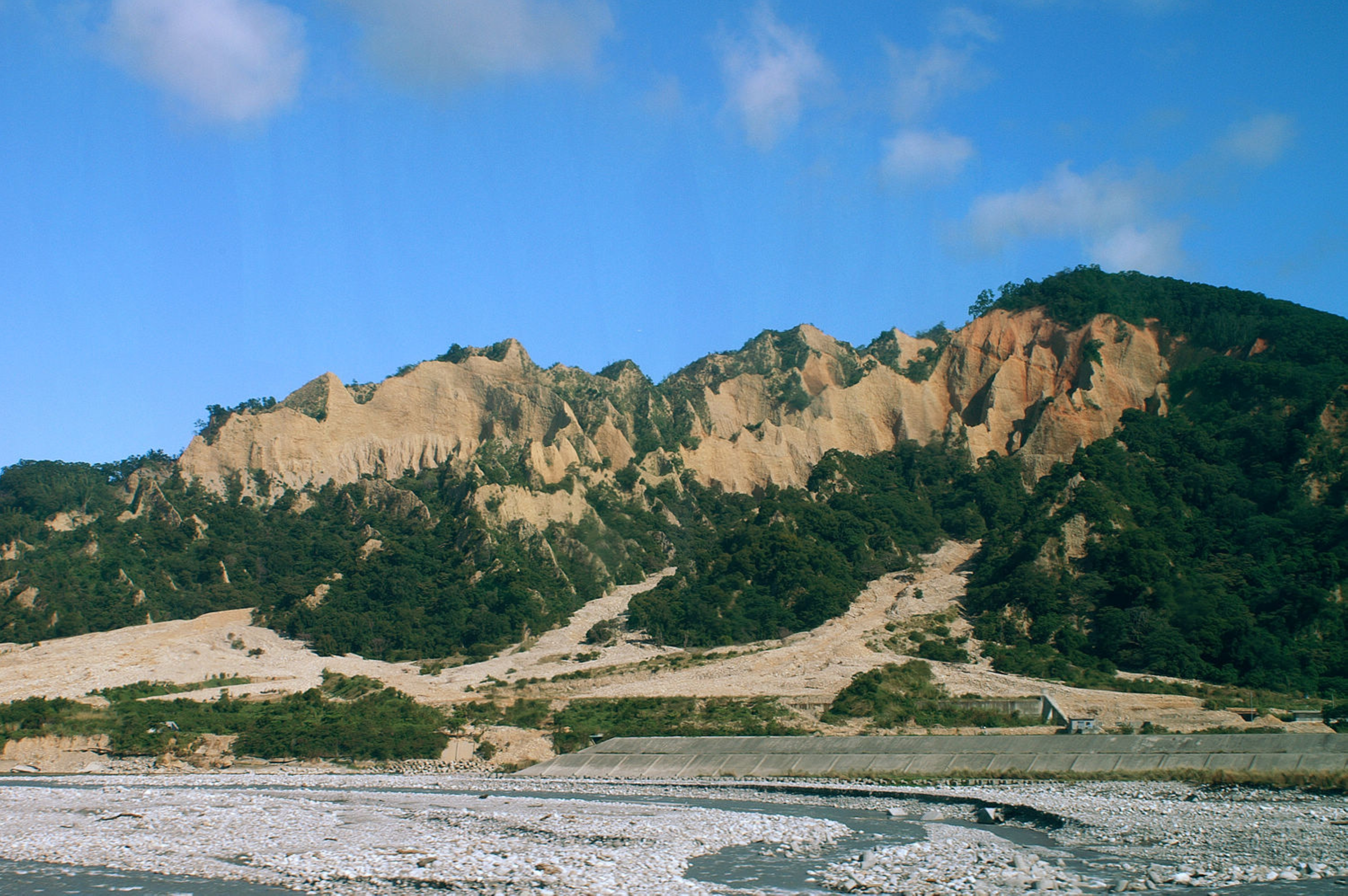
Huoyan Mountain from the south

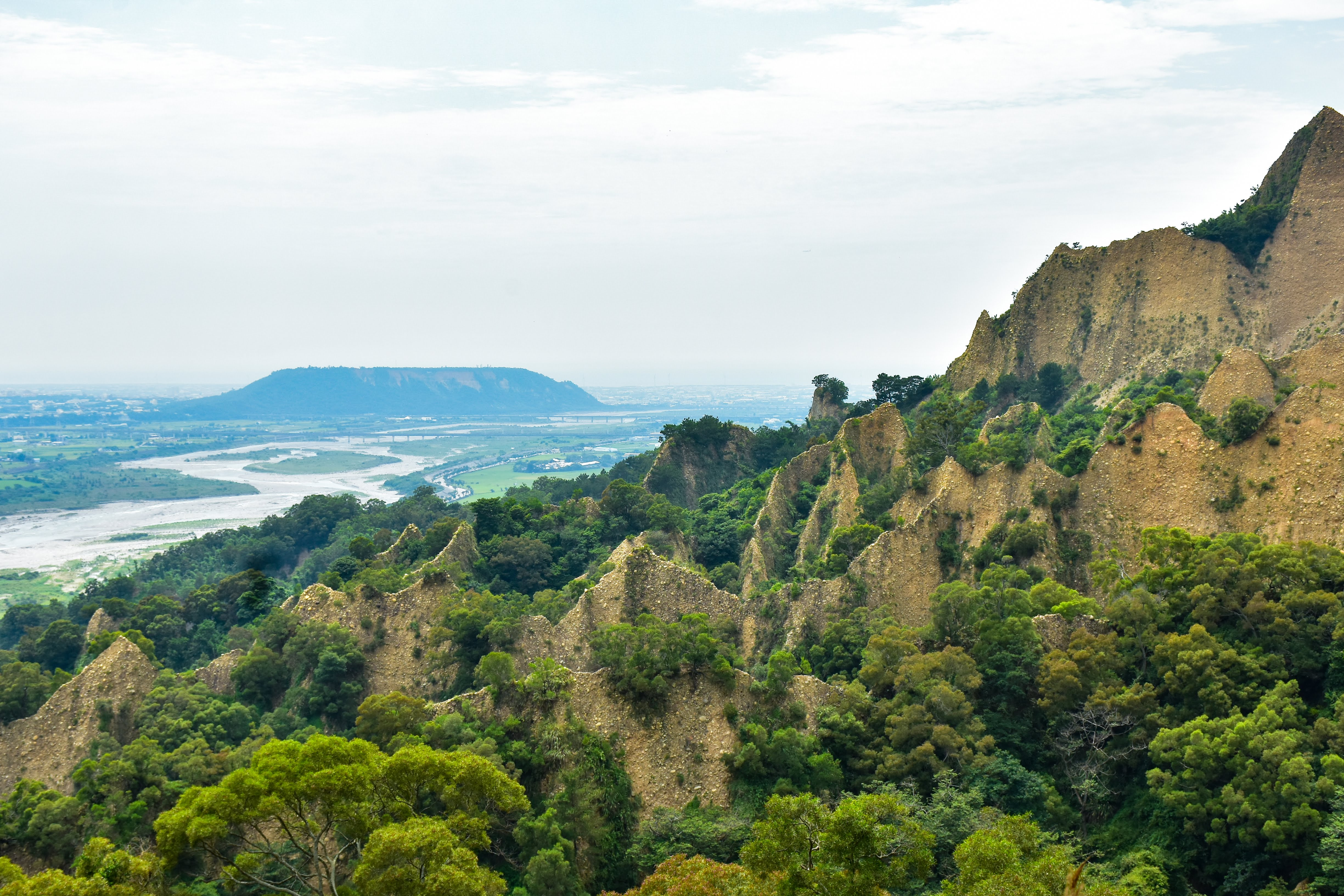
View from a hiking trail on Huoyan Mountain. Tiezhan Mountain in Dajia is visible in the background.

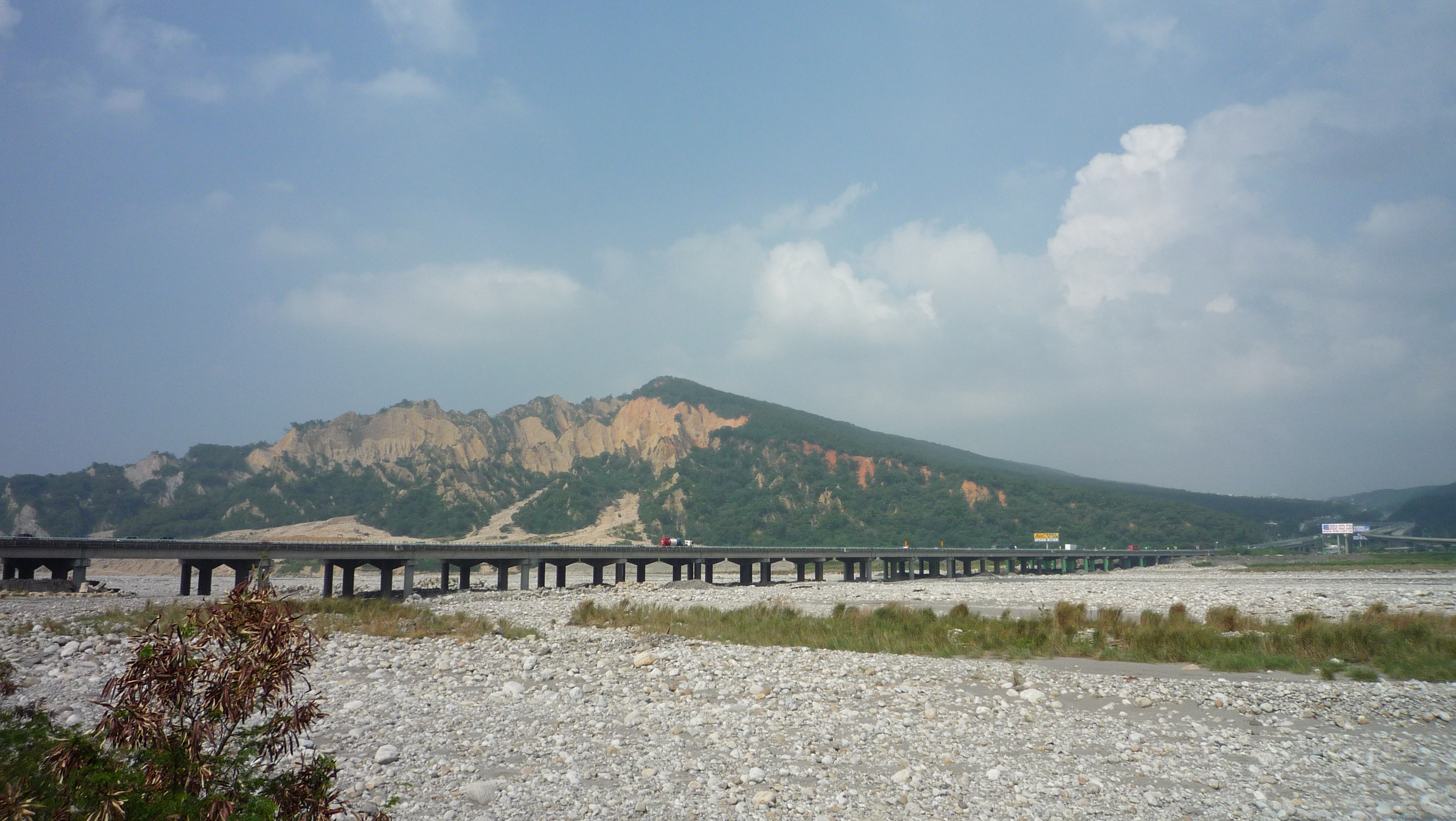
Huoyan Mountain with National Freeway 1 in the foreground

== See also ==
- Huoyan Mountain Ecology Museum
- Jiujiufeng
