= Yu Su-may =

Taiwanese plant pathologist

Yu Su-may (Chinese: 余淑美; born 3 November 1952) is a Taiwanese plant pathologist.

Yu was born on 3 November 1952, and graduated from National Chung Hsing University with bachelor's and master's degrees in plant pathology. She then moved to the United States to attend the University of Arkansas between 1980 and 1984, where she completed a doctorate in plant biology and pathology. Yu pursued postdoctoral research at Cold Spring Harbor Laboratory, the University of Rochester, and Cornell University before returning to Taiwan for an associate research fellow position at the Academia Sinica's Institute of Molecular Biology in 1989. She was successively named a research fellow in 1997 and a distinguished research fellow in 2008.

Yu was elected a fellow of The World Academy of Sciences in 2005, a fellow of the American Association for the Advancement of Science in 2009, and a member of Academia Sinica in 2012.

In 2014, Yu won the Outstanding Award of the Taiwan Outstanding Women in Science Awards for her research on plant molecular biology and locus control region.
