= 1999 Jiji earthquake =

Earthquake in Taiwan

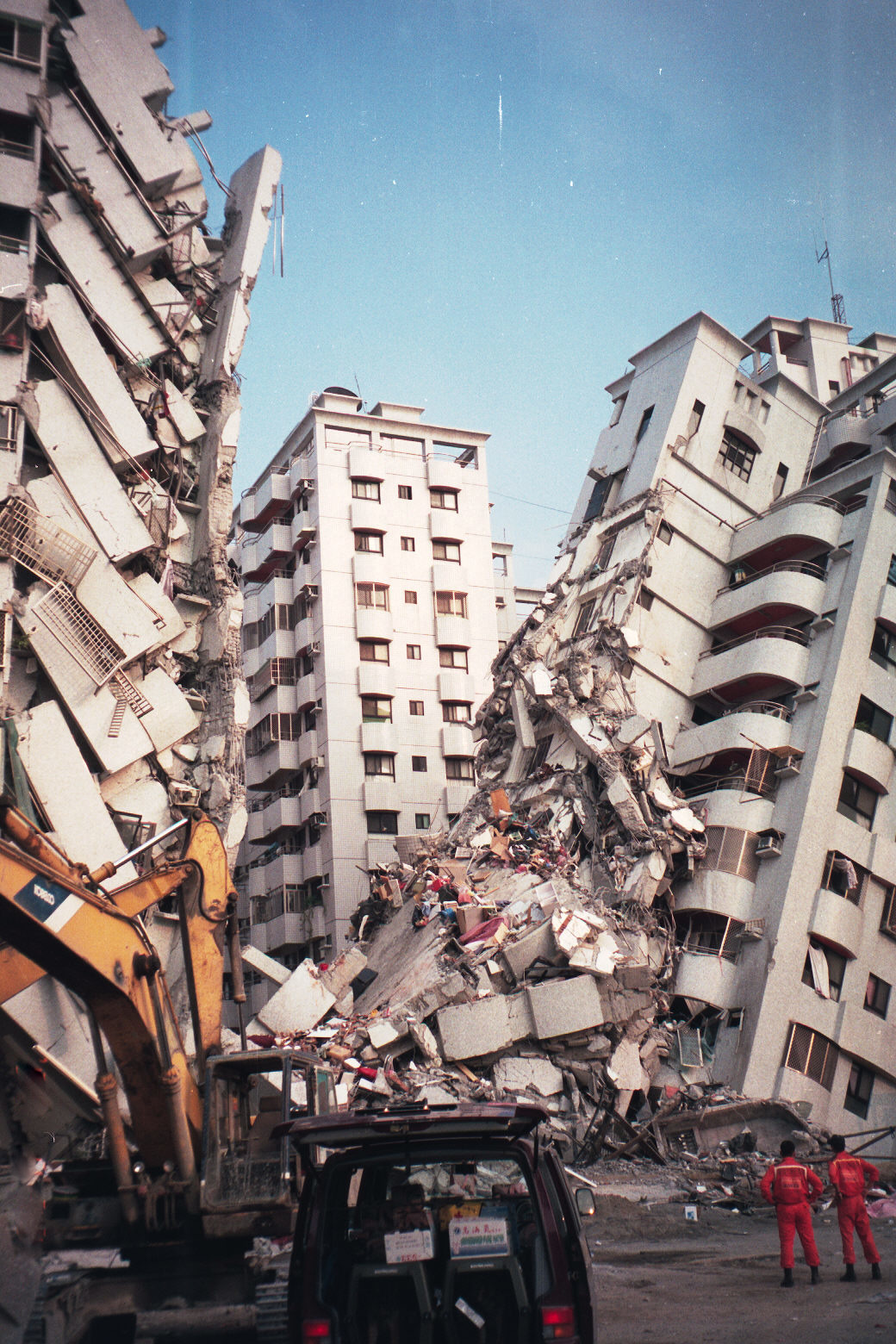
- Earthquake damage in Dali District, Taichung

- Location within Taiwan
- UTC time: 1999-09-20 17:47:16
- ISC event: 1718616
- USGS-ANSS: ComCat
- Local date: September 21, 1999; 27 years ago
- Local time: 01:47:12 local time
- Magnitude: 7.7 M_{w} 7.3 M_{L}
- Depth: 33 km (20.5 mi)
- Epicenter: Jiji (Chi-Chi), Nantou, Taiwan; 23.772°N 120.982°E
- Areas affected: Taiwan
- Total damage: 51,711 buildings destroyed, 53,768 buildings damaged
- Max. intensity: CWA 7 (MMI X)
- Peak acceleration: 1.92 g
- Peak velocity: 318 cm/s
- Casualties: 2,415 dead, 11,305 injured, 29 missing

The Chi-Chi earthquake (later also known as the Jiji earthquake, (Note: Taiwanese: 集集地動 Pe̍h-ōe-jī: Chi̍p-chi̍p Tē-tāng; Mandarin: 集集地震; pinyin: Jíjí dìzhèn; Wade–Giles: Chi^{2}-Chi^{2} Ti^{4}-chên^{4}) 921 Earthquake, or the great earthquake of September 21 (Note: Taiwanese: 九二一大地動; Pe̍h-ōe-jī: Kiú-jī-it Tōa-tē-tāng; Mandarin: 九二一大地震; Jiǔ-èr-yī dàdìzhèn; '921 earthquake')), was a 7.3 M_{L} or 7.7 M_{w} earthquake which occurred in Jiji (Chi-Chi), Nantou County, Taiwan on September 21, 1999, at 01:47:12 local time. 2,415 people were killed, 11,305 injured, and NT$300 billion worth of damage was done. It is the second-deadliest earthquake in Taiwan's recorded history, after the 1935 Shinchiku-Taichū earthquake.

Rescue groups from around the world joined local relief workers and the Taiwanese military in digging out survivors, clearing rubble, restoring essential services and distributing food and other aid to the more than 100,000 people made homeless by the quake. The disaster, dubbed the "Quake of the Century" by the local media, had a profound effect on the economy of the island and the consciousness of the people, and dissatisfaction with the government's performance in reacting to it was cited by a Taiwanese sociologist as a factor in the unseating of the ruling Kuomintang party in the 2000 presidential election.

The Disaster Prevention and Protection Act was enacted on June 30, 2000, by Taiwan Government, designated September 21 as National Disaster Prevention Day. Every year on September 21 at 9:21 AM, a drill message is sent to all mobile phones through the Public Warning System in the form of a national alert.

== Geology ==
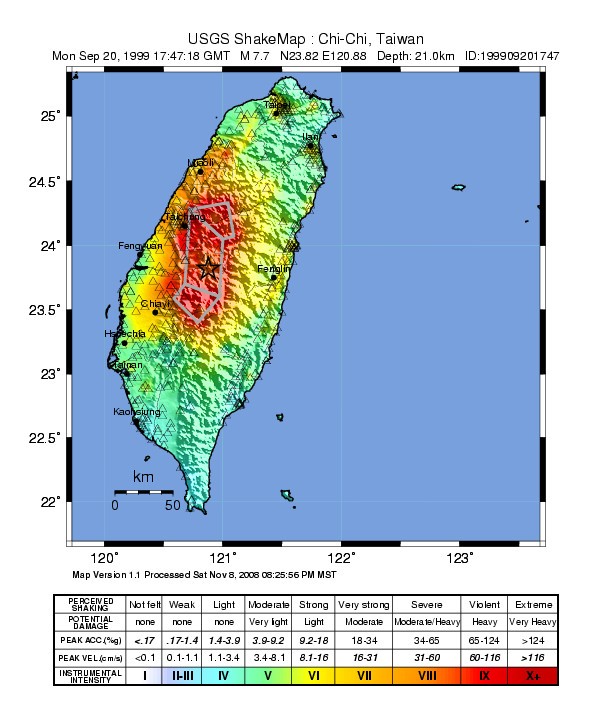
USGS ShakeMap for the event

Aftershock of Chi-Chi earthquake

Magnitude map of 1999 Chi-Chi earthquake

The earthquake struck at 01:47:12.6 TST on Tuesday, September 21, 1999 (i.e., 1999-09-21, hence "921"). The epicenter was at 23.77° N latitude, 120.98° E longitude, 9.2 km (5.7 mi) southwest of Sun Moon Lake, near the town of Jiji (Chi-Chi), Nantou County. The tremor measured 7.7 on the moment magnitude scale and 7.3 on the Richter scale, and the focal depth was 8.0 km (5.0 mi). The Central Weather Bureau recorded a total of 12,911 aftershocks in the month following the mainshock. The total energy released is estimated to be 2.1 × 10^{17} J, approximately the same as the yield of the Tsar Bomba. The earthquake was in an unusual location for Taiwan, which experiences the majority of its earthquakes off the eastern coast, with such quakes normally causing little damage. One of the aftershocks, on September 26, measured 6.8 on the Richter scale and caused previously weakened buildings to collapse, killing another three people.

At the time of the quake, Taiwan had the most extensive network of sensors and monitoring stations in the world, resulting in "probably the best data set ever collected for an earthquake". At one station, a peak ground motion of 300 cm/s (3 m/s; 10 ft/s) was recorded, the highest ever measurement taken in an earthquake anywhere. Soil liquefaction was observed at Yuanlin and caused settlement of building foundations and filling in of water wells from sand boils. The earthquake occurred along the Chelungpu Fault in the western part of the island of Taiwan. The fault stretches along the foothills of the Central Mountains in Nantou County and Taichung County (now part of Taichung City). Some sections of land near the fault were raised as much as 7 m (23 ft). Near Dongshih, near the northern end of the fault, a nearly 7 m (23 ft) high waterfall was created by the earthquake as the surface rupture offset the channel of the Dajia River. The total surface rupture was about 100 km in length.

== Damage ==
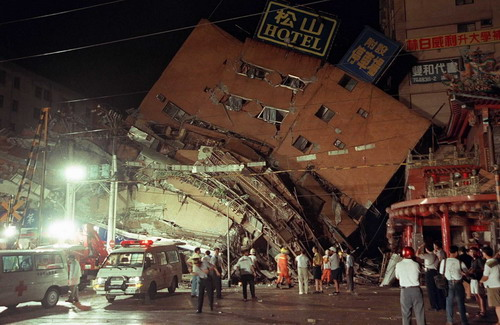
Tunghsing Building, in Taipei City, after the quake

Damage caused by the earthquake included 2,415 deaths, 29 missing, 11,305 severely wounded, with 51,711 buildings completely destroyed, 53,768 buildings severely damaged, and a total of NT$300 billion (US$10 billion) worth of damage. Power was cut to a large portion of the island due to damage to power stations, transmission stations, and the automatic shutdown of Taiwan's three nuclear power plants, which were restarted two days later. National electricity provider Taipower stated that a day after the quake power had been restored to 59% of the country. 102 major bridges were badly damaged, with many having to be torn down. The Central Cross-Island Highway, at the time the only major complete route across the mountains in central Taiwan, was badly damaged. Subsequent storm damage and the high cost of restoration means that the highway remains partially closed as of 2018. There were a total of 132 landslides during the main quake and the aftershocks, some causing loss of life as rockfalls crushed houses. 870 schools suffered damage, with 125 severely damaged, closing many down for months or even permanently in a few cases.

=== Central Taiwan ===
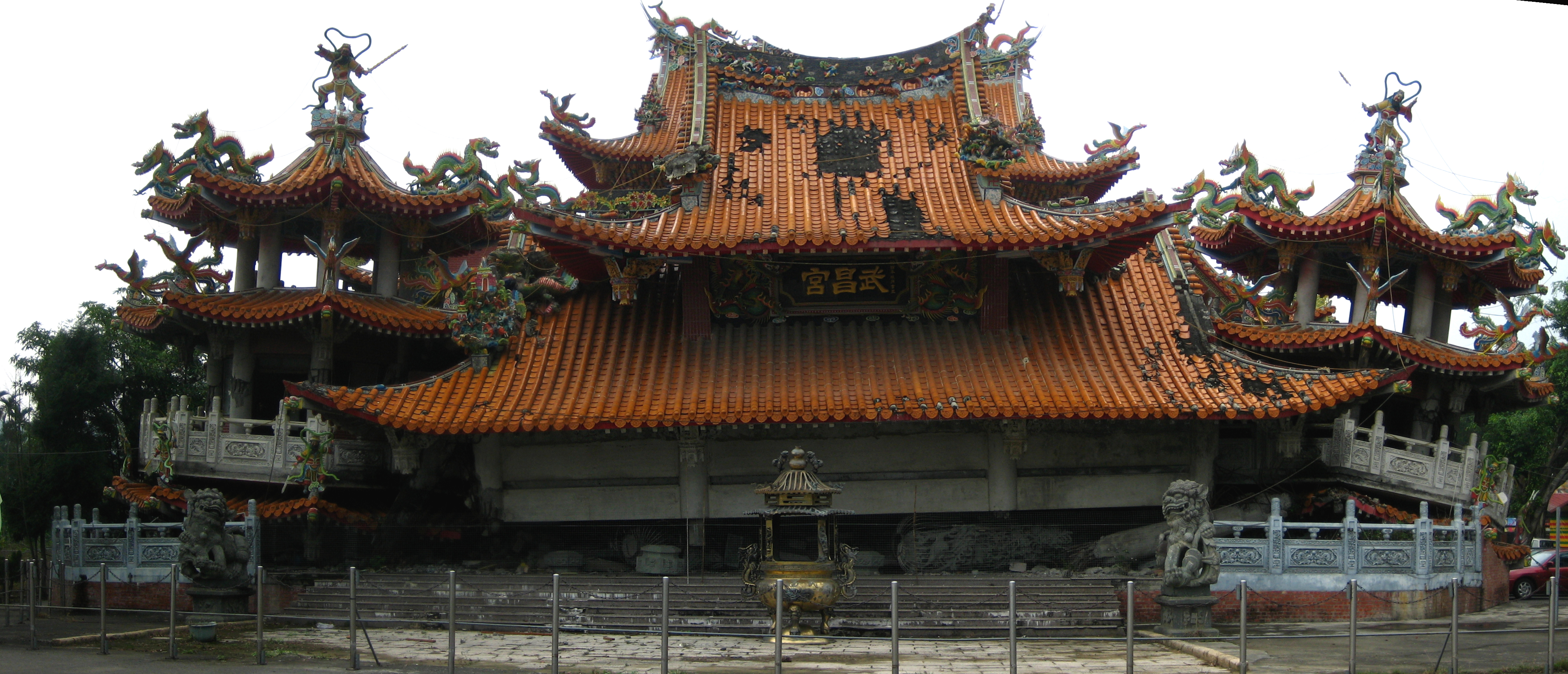
Collapsed Wuchang Temple (武昌宮) in Jiji (Chi-Chi), Nantou

In Nantou County, towns such as Puli suffered heavy damage, with 846 deaths, 153 missing and 1,889 injuries. Due to the relatively remote location of many of the affected settlements, aid from the central government took some time to reach some survivors. About 80% of houses in Zhongliao were severely damaged or destroyed.

At least 1,074 deaths and 3,648 injuries were reported in Taichung County, where 3,211 houses were destroyed. The Port of Taichung, one of Taiwan's major commercial harbours, was badly damaged and had to be temporarily closed.

=== Northern Taiwan ===
In Taipei City, far from the epicentre of the quake, the 12-storey Tunghsing Building collapsed, resulting in 87 deaths. The building was later found to be unsoundly built: structural pillars and beams were stuffed with plastic bottles and newspaper instead of brick and concrete. Blame for the collapse was levelled by survivors at both the construction company which built the high-rise and local government for lax enforcement of building codes and safety standards. Five people were indicted in the wake of the disaster.

=== Economic damage ===
The Taiwan Stock Exchange was closed for business for five days following the earthquake. A significant portion of the world supply of computer memory chips (RAM) was at the time made in Taiwan, and the six-day shutdown of Hsinchu Science Park and other factories resulting from the quake caused computer memory prices to triple on world markets. With Taiwan struggling to recover from the after-effects of the 1997 Asian financial crisis, the economic damage of the earthquake was great cause for concern, with estimates that the total cost would be some 10% of the entire gross domestic product of the country in 1999.

=== Causes of building collapse and public reaction ===
The immediate rescue efforts were still ongoing when public anger began to mount at shoddy construction that many felt was responsible for the high number of casualties. Criticism was directed at legal building codes, enforcement of those codes, and the construction companies themselves. Constructors and architects of modern buildings that collapsed were detained by the authorities, their assets frozen and travel documents seized. One of the issues highlighted after the quake was "soft stories": high, open ground floors in high-rise buildings with little structural support. This led to the ground floor collapsing first in a quake, either toppling the other floors or starting a pancake collapse. Buildings in Taiwan over 50 metres (160 ft) tall require a peer review process; no building that had undergone this process collapsed, contrasting with a number of dramatic failures of buildings just under 50 metres in height.

Statistics of Damage by Administrative Areas
County/City	Deaths	Serious Injuries	Completely Collapsed	Partially Collapsed
Nantou County	886	678	23,127	16,792
Taichung County	1,154	411	16,861	12,341
Taichung City	113	47	1,484	4,953
Changhua County	29	11	1,048	3,054
Yunlin County	85	60	916	321
Chiayi County	6	0	30	91
Tainan County	1	0	1	1
Taipei City	87	7	76	325
Taipei County	46	29	230	3,264
Miaoli County	6	196	529	473
Hsinchu City	2	1	5	0

== Rescue efforts ==
Immediately following the earthquake an emergency cabinet meeting was convened to discuss how to tackle the aftermath. The same day the ROC military was mobilised, with large numbers of conscripted soldiers heading to stricken regions to assist in distributing emergency supplies, clearing roads, and rescuing people trapped in the rubble. Helicopters were used to evacuate injured people from mountainous regions to hospitals, and to supply food to communities inaccessible by road. The military also assumed the leading role in recovering the dead from damaged structures.

One of the last people to be rescued was a six-year-old boy pulled alive from the rubble of his collapsed home in Taichung County by a team of South Korean and Japanese search and rescue workers, some 88 hours after the quake. Even later, nearly 130 hours after the earthquake, two brothers emerged alive from the ruins of the Tunghsing Building in Taipei to the astonishment of rescuers. The brothers survived on the water sprayed from fire hoses, rotten fruit, and their own urine.

== International response ==
There was widespread international sympathy for those affected by the earthquake, and over 700 rescue workers from more than 20 countries aided in the immediate aftermath. Initially Taiwan's isolated diplomatic situation caused a delay in a response from the United Nations, which abides by the "One China Policy", and so chose not to act without the approval of the Beijing government because of its geopolitical clout.

- Canada: A 5-member volunteer Search and Rescue team from Abbotsford, British Columbia, under the umbrella of a private company, and supported by the local Taiwanese community, provided Search and Rescue services for 96 hrs.
- China: Relations between the two sides had been particularly strained shortly before the earthquake, with tensions high over the impending presidential elections in Taiwan. General secretary of the Communist party Jiang Zemin sparked hope of an improvement in relations when he expressed the sorrow of mainland Chinese at news of the disaster, and stated that "we are willing to offer any possible assistance to alleviate quake-caused losses." Jiang went on to say that "Compatriots of the two sides are as closely linked as flesh and blood. The catastrophe and agony of our Taiwan compatriots influences the hearts of all Chinese." However, after a few days the Taipei government was accusing Beijing of exploiting the earthquake for political ends and blocking speedy assistance from the international community getting to those in need. A Russian flight carrying search and rescue personnel was refused permission to cross Chinese airspace on its way to Taiwan, and the PRC insisted that any attempts to send aid to Taiwan from other nations needed the blessing of the Beijing government first, slowing the arrival of international help. A few years later according to an interview, the blockade news mentioned above was denied and unheard by Russians.
- France: President Jacques Chirac "addressed a message of sincere sympathy and condolences to all the victims of this catastrophe and their families. France is following the situation closely and is ready to provide the Taiwanese people with the support and emergency aid they may need."
- Germany: Chancellor Gerhard Schröder spoke of his "deep compassion to the quake victims and their families".
- Japan: US$500,000 in aid was pledged by the Japanese government, along with more than 100 rescue workers. Prime Minister Keizo Obuchi offered his condolences on behalf of the Japanese people.
- Slovakia: A 4-member volunteer Search and Rescue team with 3 search dogs was assembled and arrived to Taiwan within 30 hours from the earthquake and provided services for 4 consecutive days. The costs for the team were covered by private individuals and corporate entities from Slovakia. The transport costs were covered by Eva Air and the local presence and accommodation was supported and coordinated by Taiwanese authorities.
- Mexico: The Mexican team of rescue workers was involved in tackling the Tunghsing Building collapse and earned widespread praise for their skill and commitment.
- Russia: A team of 76 rescue workers was first dispatched by the Emergency Situations Ministry to help with the search and rescue efforts.
- Singapore: A medical team of five doctors and 12 combat medics was sent by the Singapore Armed Forces to provide medical support for 11 days.
- South Korea: In addition to the cash grant, the Korea International Search and Rescue Team (Chief Commander Park Chung-wung) was deployed to the affected site for 2 weeks, and during the operation, the team rescued a 6-year-old boy who had lost both parents and his younger sister due to the building collapse caused by the earthquake. The boy had survived for 84 hours without external assistance such as water and food.
- Turkey: Having been hit by a devastating earthquake just the previous month, Turkish NGOs had recent experience in search and rescue operations. A 15-person team from Turkey left for Taiwan within hours of news of the quake being received.
- United Kingdom: Condolences were offered by Elizabeth II, who in a statement said, "The Queen was greatly saddened to learn of the terrible earthquake in Taiwan and the consequent tragic loss of life." A relief team of six people from Rapid UK, a disaster rescue group, was dispatched to help search for trapped survivors.
- United States: President Bill Clinton issued a statement, saying that "our thoughts are with all of those who have suffered losses and who may still be in need of assistance", while also pledging aid to assist in disaster recovery. Despite the lack of official diplomatic relations with Taiwan, US authorities liaised directly with their Taiwanese counterparts, and sent an 85-person team to assist in the aftermath.
- Vatican City: Pope John Paul II expressed his concern in his Angelus of September 26, remarking that "at these days my thoughts have constantly turned to the beloved people of Taiwan as they recover from the recent quake and its devastating aftermath".

== Clean-up and reconstruction ==
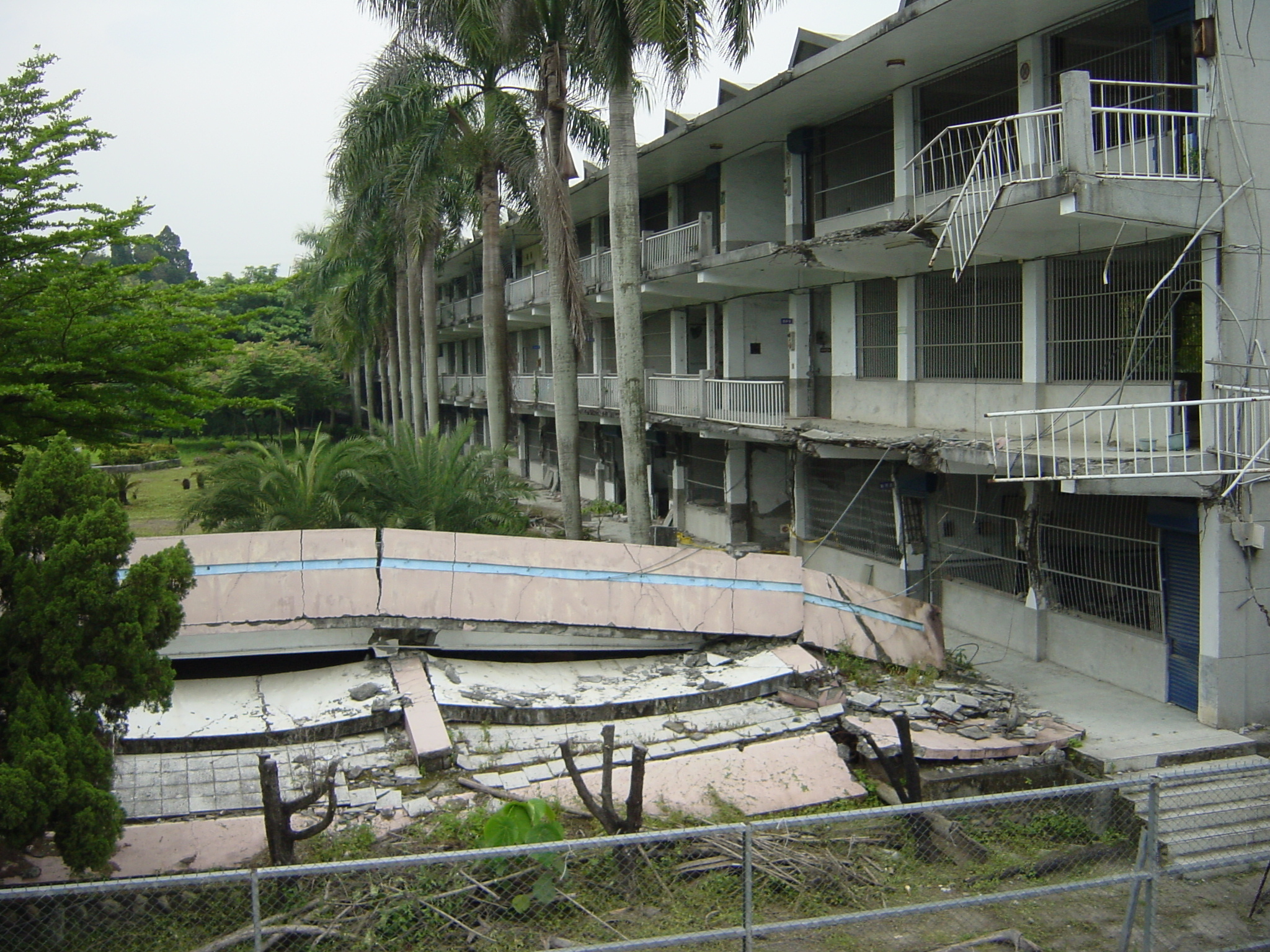
Heavily damaged Guangfu Junior High School in Wufeng (921 Earthquake Museum of Taiwan)

On September 25 President Lee Teng-hui declared a state of emergency in the affected areas, giving sweeping powers to local authorities to ignore the usual bureaucratic and legal restrictions on measures to bring relief to people and locations most in need. This was the first time emergency powers had been used since the death of former President Chiang Ching-kuo in 1989.

Many charities, corporations, and private individuals contributed to the relief effort and the later reconstruction. Private donations directly to the government-run disaster fund totalled NT$33.9 billion, while organisations including the Presbyterian Church of Taiwan, Rotary International, Cathay Life Insurance, Dharma Drum Mountain, I-Kuan Tao, the Tzu Chi Foundation and various temple, church, and community groups all contributed to aiding survivors and funding reconstruction. The Church of Jesus Christ of Latter-day Saints provided both direct relief and translation services for the foreign rescue teams, while the Red Cross of the People's Republic of China contributed US$3m to the Red Cross Society of the Republic of China, which amassed a fund of NT$1.8bn towards disaster relief.

Following the election of President Chen Shui-bian in March 2000, the reconstruction policies were continued despite the change in ruling party. Chen said in his inaugural address in May 2000 that "our people experienced an unprecedented catastrophe last year, and the wounds are yet to be healed. The new cabinet feels that restoration cannot be delayed ... Reconstruction has to cover every victim and every earthquake-affected area."

One task that had to be undertaken was the setting of new land ownership boundaries in areas where the landscape had been significantly altered by the quake. The whole island was elongated about 1.5 metres (4 ft 11 in) in the north–south axis and compressed west–east by the forces unleashed. One solution offered to land issues was to offer landowners an equivalent parcel of government land not located on a fault line.

== Aftermath ==
Following the earthquake, the Atomic Energy Council installed the automation seismic trip system (ASTS) to Taiwan's existing three nuclear power plants to further ensure plant safety. Installation and testing were completed in November 2007.

== Legacy ==
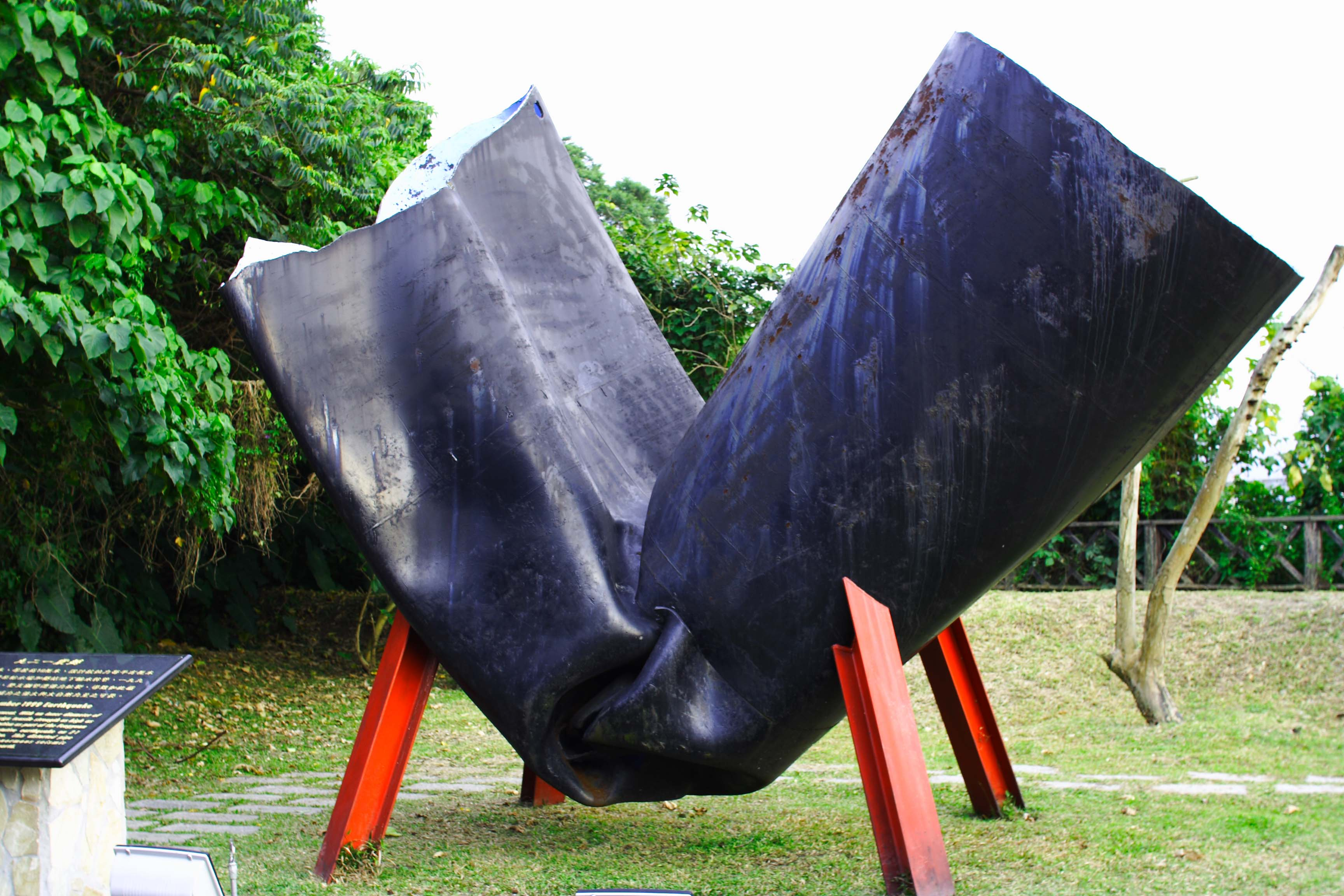
Waterworks pipe bent by the earthquake, 2 meters (7 ft) in width and 1.8 cm (0.7 inches) in thickness, originally underground in Fengyuan, Taichung County, exhibited at the Museum of Drinking Water, Zhongzheng District, Taipei

The quake has become part of the Taiwanese consciousness, and is often referred to simply as 9-21 (九二一; Jiǔ'èryī) after the date it occurred (September 21). Unhappiness with the government's performance in response to the disaster was reflected in a drop in support for vice-president Lien Chan who was standing as the Kuomintang candidate for the 2000 presidential election.

In Wufeng, a township in southern Taichung County, the damage was especially devastating; the village's Guangfu Junior High School lay directly on the fault line and was severely damaged by the quake. Today the junior high school is the site of the National Museum of Natural Science's 921 Earthquake Museum, designated by Executive Yuan of Taiwan as one of the 921 Earthquake National Memorial Sites, along with Jiujiufeng Nature Preservation Area, Jiufen'er Shan National Earthquake Memorial Sites, and the Caoling Geopark.

A fault from the earthquake was discovered in Zhushan Township, Nantou County by a professor from National Taiwan University conducting research in the area in November 2002. To preserve the surface rupture, the Chelungpu Fault Preservation Park was established and opened to the public in 2013.

A permanent fault shift in Shigang District resulted in serious damage to the Shigang Dam, as well as the necessity of patching affected roads and trails with inclines, in order to restore their usefulness. Two notable examples of this are the biking/hiking trail between Dongshi District and Fengyuan District, and Fengshi Road which also connects these two districts. Some locals humorously call this new inclination "Singapore", in Chinese (新加坡; 'newly-added slope').

The tenth anniversary of the earthquake in 2009 was marked by commemorative activities in some of the areas affected. Taipei, Dongshi, Wufeng, Puli, Jiji (Chi-Chi) and Zhongxing New Village held various events to remember the victims of the earthquake, the rescuers who aided them, and the reconstruction efforts which followed.

The Taiwan Chelungpu-fault Drilling Project (TCDP), co-led by Taiwanese scholars Kuo-Fong Ma, Yiben Tsai and international collaborators in the US and Japan, drilled research boreholes to investigate the Chelungpu Fault. This led to multiple discoveries about the causes of the earthquake and empirical breakthroughs in seismology, most notably the first measurement of an earthquake slip zone. The drilling project also uncovered that the earthquake was in part caused by the movement of underground water. The team defined such earthquakes as "isotropic event", an earthquake-like event caused by natural hydraulic fracturing. This finding has important implications for fracking operations.

== See also ==
- John Walker, Chi-Chi earthquake benefit concerts
- List of deadly earthquakes since 1900
- List of earthquakes in 1999
- List of earthquakes in Taiwan
- Lists of 20th-century earthquakes
- National Center for Research on Earthquake Engineering (NCREE)
