= George L. Turin =

American computer scientist (born 1930)

George Lewis Turin (born 27 January 1930) was an American computer scientist.

From 1983 to 1986, Turin was the Dean of UCLA Henry Samueli School of Engineering and Applied Science. Turin retired from UC Berkeley in 1990, and died in March 2014.

Turin was an IEEE Fellow, a Fellow of the British Science and Engineering Research Council, and was a member of the National Academy of Engineering. His Ph.D. supervisor was Wilbur Davenport.
