= Surface rupture =

Offset at ground-level after earthquakes

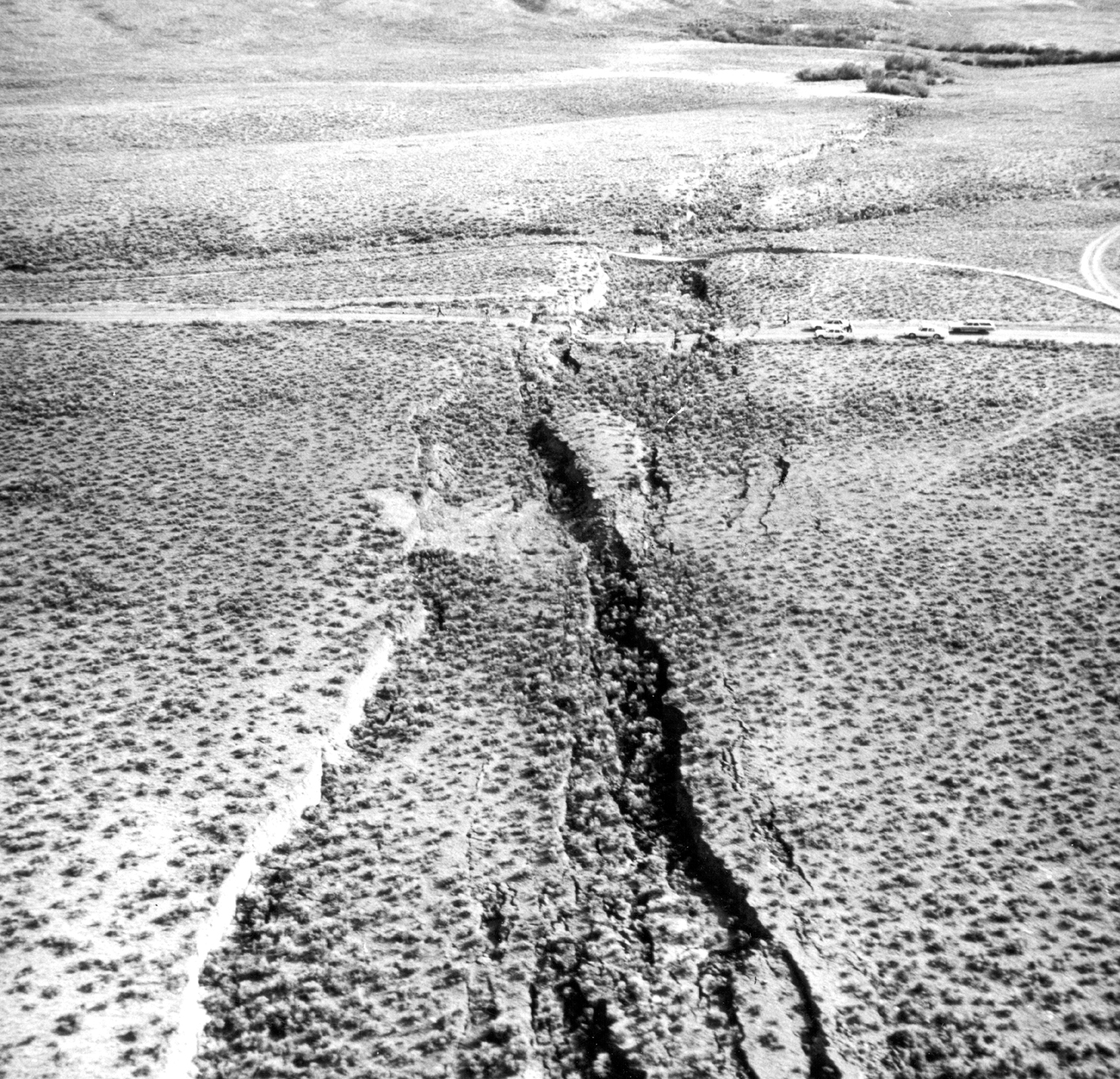
Surface rupture caused by normal faulting along the Lost River Fault, during the 1983 Borah Peak earthquake

In seismology, surface rupture (or ground rupture, or ground displacement) is the visible offset of the ground surface when an earthquake rupture along a fault affects the Earth's surface. Surface rupture is opposed by buried rupture, where there is no displacement at ground level. This is a major risk to any structure that is built across a fault zone that may be active, in addition to any risk from ground shaking. Surface rupture entails vertical or horizontal movement, on either side of a ruptured fault. Surface rupture can affect large areas of land.

== Lack of surface rupture ==
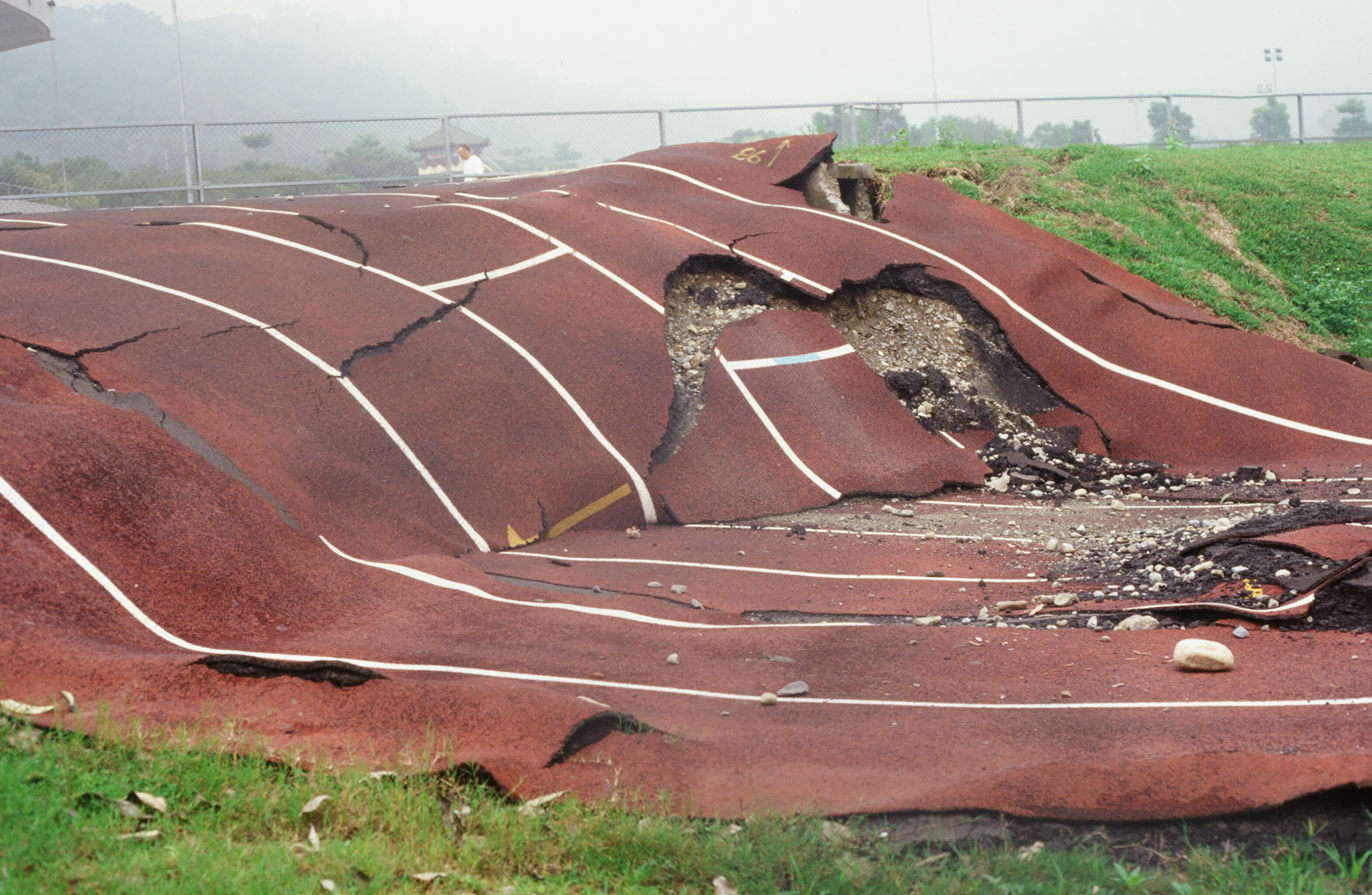
Surface rupture with folding due to reverse faulting along the Chelungpu Fault during the 1999 Jiji earthquake, Taiwan

Not every earthquake results in surface rupture, particularly for smaller and deeper earthquakes. In some cases, however, the lack of surface effects is because the fault that moved does not reach the surface. For example, the 1994 Northridge earthquake had a moment magnitude of 6.7, caused major damage in the Los Angeles area, occurred at 18.2 km (11 mi) below the Earth's surface, but did not cause surface rupture, because it was a blind thrust earthquake.

== Where surface rupture occurs ==
Surface ruptures commonly occur on pre-existing faults. Only rarely are earthquakes (and surface ruptures) associated with faulting on entirely new fault structures. There is shallow hypocenter, and large fracture energy on the asperities, the asperity shallower than 5 kilometres (3.1 mi). Examples of such earthquakes are San Fernando earthquake, Tabas earthquake, and Chi-Chi earthquake.

In surface rupture earthquakes, the large slips of land are concentrated in the shallow parts of the fault. And, notably, permanent ground displacements which are measureable can be produced by shallow earthquakes, of magnitude M5 and greater.

== Types of surface rupture ==
The form that surface rupturing takes depends on two things: the nature of the material at the surface and the type of fault movement.

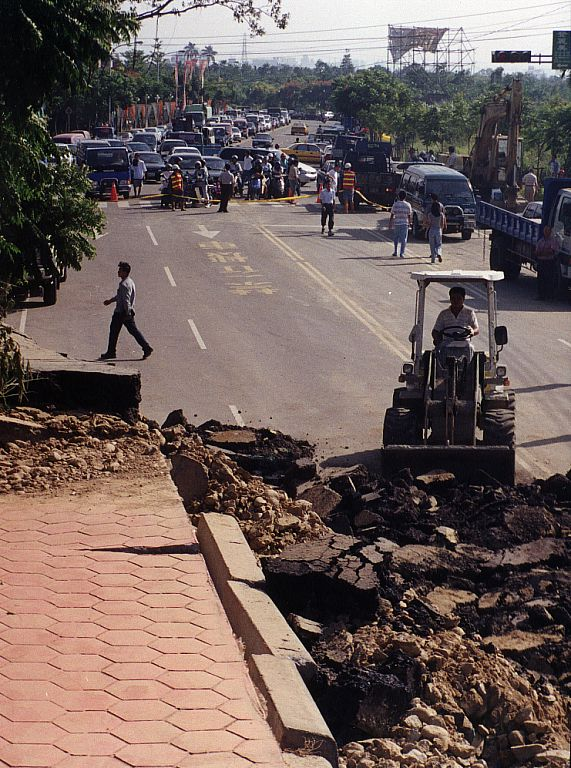
Consequences of the Chi-Chi earthquake, Jiji, Nantou County, Taiwan

=== Effect of surface lithology ===
Where there are thick superficial deposits overlying the trace of the faults, the resulting surface effects are typically more discontinuous. Where there is little or no superficial deposits, the surface rupture is generally continuous, except where the earthquake rupture affects more than one fault, which can lead to complex patterns of surface faulting, such as in the 1992 Landers earthquake.

=== Normal faulting ===
Surface ruptures associated with normal faults are typically simple fault scarps. Where there are significant superficial deposits, sections with more oblique faulting may form sets of en-echelon scarp segments. Antithetic faults may also develop, giving rise to surface grabens.

=== Reverse faulting ===
Reverse faulting (particularly thrust faulting) is associated with more complex surface rupture patterns since the protruding unsupported part of the hanging-wall of the fault is liable to collapse. In addition there may be surface folding and back-thrust development.

=== Strike-slip faulting ===
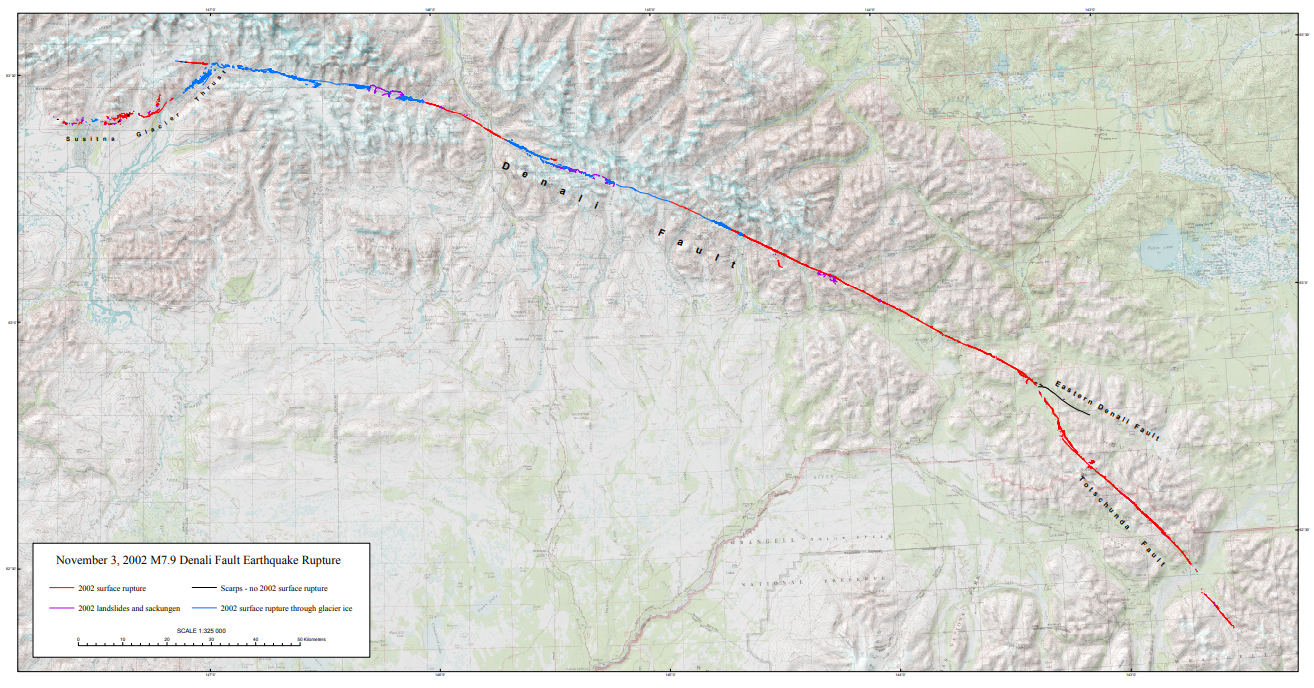
Extent of surface rupture caused by strike-slip faulting during the 2002 Denali earthquake

CCTV capturing a rupture shifting the ground during the 2025 Myanmar earthquake. This video marked the first recorded evidence of an earthquake rupture in-motion, as well as the first documentation of a curved slip earthquake.

Strike-slip faults are associated with dominantly horizontal movement, leading to relatively simple linear zones of surface rupture where the fault is a simple planar structure. However, many strike-slip faults are formed of overlapping segments, leading to complex zones of normal or reverse faulting depending on the nature of the overlap. Additionally, where there are thick superficial deposits, the rupture typically appears as a set of en-echelon faults.

== Mitigation ==
To retrofit a house to survive surface rupture requires engineered design by geotechnical, and structural or civil engineers. This can be quite expensive.

== Examples ==
Extent	M_{w}	Location	Type	Event
34 km (21 mi)	6.9	Idaho, United States	Normal	1983 Borah Peak earthquake
80 km (50 mi)	7.3	California, United States	Strike-slip	1992 Landers earthquake
50 km (31 mi)	6.9	Hyogo, Japan	Strike-slip	1995 Kobe earthquake
150 km (93 mi)	7.6	Turkey	Strike-slip	1999 İzmit earthquake
100 km (62 mi)	7.6	Taiwan	Thrust	1999 Jiji earthquake
400 km (250 mi)	7.8	Qinghai, China	Strike-slip	2001 Kunlun earthquake
340 km (210 mi)	7.9	Alaska, United States	Strike-slip	2002 Denali earthquake
300 km (190 mi)	7.9	Sichuan, China	Thrust	2008 Sichuan earthquake
400 km (250 mi)	7.8	Turkey	Strike-slip	2023 Turkey–Syria earthquakes
500 km (310 mi)	7.7	Myanmar	Strike-slip	2025 Myanmar earthquake

== See also ==
- Aseismic creep
- Ground fissure
- Vertical displacement

== External links and references ==
- A large article about surface rupture
