= Victor On-kwok Li =

American Hong Kong academic (born 1954)

LI, On-kwok, Victor
- Born: October 11, 1954 (age 71); Hong Kong
- Other names: 李安国 (Li On-kwok), Victor Li On-kwok, Victor Li
- Education: Massachusetts Institute of Technology
- Occupations: Chair Professor of Information Engineering, University of Hong Kong Head of Department of Electrical and Electronic Engineering, University of Hong Kong
- Awards: Government of Hong Kong Bronze Bauhinia Star, 2001
- Scientific career
- Fields: Information technology Renewable energy Social network Wireless network Mathematical optimization
- Workplaces: Department of Electrical and Electronic Engineering, the University of Hong Kong 1997-present); Information Sciences Institute, University of Southern California (1981-1997)
- Doctoral advisor: Wilbur Davenport
- Doctoral students: Wanjiun Liao

Professor Victor On-kwok Li (born October 11, 1954) is an American Hong Kong academic. He is best known for his contributions to the development of Information technology. He received the Government of Hong Kong Bronze Bauhinia Star in 2001, and he is a fellow of Institute of Electrical and Electronics Engineers.

Prof. Li is currently chair professor and head of the Department of Electrical and Electronic Engineering of the University of Hong Kong (HKU). He also serves as Managing Director of Versitech Ltd. He is also on the boards of SUNeVision Ltd., China.com Ltd., and Anxin-China Holding Ltd. Prof. Li also chairs the Executive Committee, HKU Initiative on Clean Energy and Environment.

From 2007 to 2012, he served as Associate Dean of Engineering at HKU. Before joining HKU in 1997, he was a professor of electrical engineering (EE) at the University of Southern California (USC) and director of Communication Sciences Institute of USC. He chaired the Computer Communications Technical Committee of the IEEE Communications Society from 1987 to 1989, and the Los Angeles Chapter of the IEEE Information Theory Group from 1983 to 1985.

Prof. Li's doctoral adviser was Prof. Wilbur Davenport, who was a student of Prof. Robert Fano.
