= Chao Agnes Hsiung =

Taiwanese biostatistician

Chao Agnes Hsiung (Chinese: 熊昭) is a Taiwanese biostatistician. She is a Distinguished Investigator in the Taiwanese National Health Research Institutes (NHRI), and Director of the Institute of Population Health Sciences and of the Division of Biostatistics and Bioinformatics within the NHRI.

== Education and career ==
Hsiung earned a bachelor's degree in mathematics from National Tsing Hua University in 1972. She went to Columbia University for graduate study in statistics, earning a master's degree in 1973 and completing her Ph.D. in 1975.

After working as an assistant professor at Cornell University from 1975 to 1976, she returned to Taiwan as an associate professor at National Central University in 1976. She was promoted to full professor in 1981. She was also a research fellow in the Institute of Statistical Science of the Academia Sinica from 1985 to 2000.

In 1997 she moved to the National Health Research Institutes as investigator and director of the Division of Biostatistics. She became a distinguished investigator there in 2002. Since 2005 she has also held an adjunct professor position in the Institute of Statistics and Department of Life Science of National Tsing-Hua University.

== Recognition ==
In 1985, Hsiung became an elected member of the International Statistical Institute. In 1994, she was chosen to become a Fellow of the Institute of Mathematical Statistics. She was president of the International Chinese Statistical Association in 2001. In 2014, Hsiung was awarded the Outstanding Award of the Taiwan Outstanding Women in Science Awards.
