= Tunghsing Building =

Building in Taiwan

Coordinates: 25°2′59″N 121°34′33″E

Tunghsing Building or Dongxing Building (Chinese: 東星大樓; pinyin: Dōngxīng Dàlóu, lit. 'East Star Building') is the name of two buildings at the same place in Songshan District, Taipei, Taiwan. The original building was destroyed by the 1999 Jiji earthquake. It was the only building in Taipei to be completely destroyed by the quake, with all 87 Taipei fatalities residents of the building. A new building on the same site was opened on August 29, 2009.

== First building ==
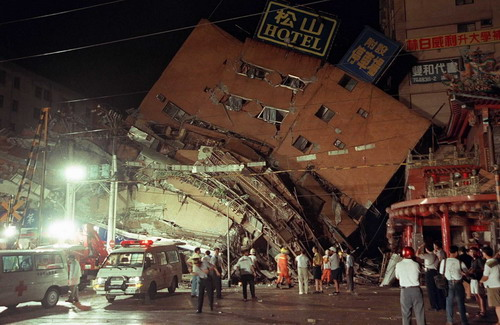
The collapsed old building, September 1999

The original Tunghsing Building was a 12-story building started in 1982 and completed in 1984, with two underground stories. The architect was Chang Tung-Hsin (張宗炘). It was a mixed-use building including a bank, apartments, and a hotel, the Sungshan Hotel (松山賓館). Some later media reports assumed the entire building was the Sungshan Hotel. The first two stories were occupied by a branch of First Commercial Bank.

On September 21, 1999, at 1:47 am local time, Taiwan was struck by the 1999 Jiji earthquake. The Tunghsing Building was completely destroyed although most buildings near it were undamaged. It was the only building in Taipei to be completely destroyed by the quake, and all 87 Taipei fatalities were residents of the building. After the bottom stories folded, the rest of the building collapsed and fell, crushing the nearby Haomen building (豪門世家). A fire from a gas leak was doused with water. Over 100 people were rescued from the wreckage. The two brothers Sun Chi-kuang and Sun Chi-fong were rescued from the rubble almost 130 hours after the earthquake, having survived by eating rotten apples and drinking their own urine. Several of their family members died in the disaster. The building's collapse made more than 250 people homeless.

== Court cases and compensation ==
After the collapse of the building, several lawsuits were filed and accusations made. In November 1999, five people including KMT lawmaker Hsieh Lung-sheng were charged with negligence related to poor construction. Residents accused the management of Hung Kuo Group of inadequate design of the building and asked for NT$2.5 billion compensation. Hung Kuo group denied being involved in the construction and stated that they had taken over the construction company Hung Gu Construction (鴻固營造) only after the design was completed. A difficulty in assessing the case was that building codes were not yet well developed at the time of construction. The case was finally decided by the Supreme Court on October 3, 2014, with an award of NT$330 million to the residents. As the defendants involved were either dead or companies who had no assets, the residents were unlikely to receive any payout. The cause of the collapse was determined to be a design flaw due to underestimating the building's weight by 18 percent.

Residents also sued the Taipei city government for compensation. In 2002, they won a district court ruling awarding them approximately NT$480 million. After appeals, a High Court ruling awarded a total of NT$330 million due to the city officials' negligence in supervising the building's construction. While the National Compensation Law only came in force shortly after the building's construction permit was issued in 1981, the court found that the Civil Code provided for compensation. The legal process was finally completed with an out-of-court settlement for NT$120 million in 2007.

== New building ==
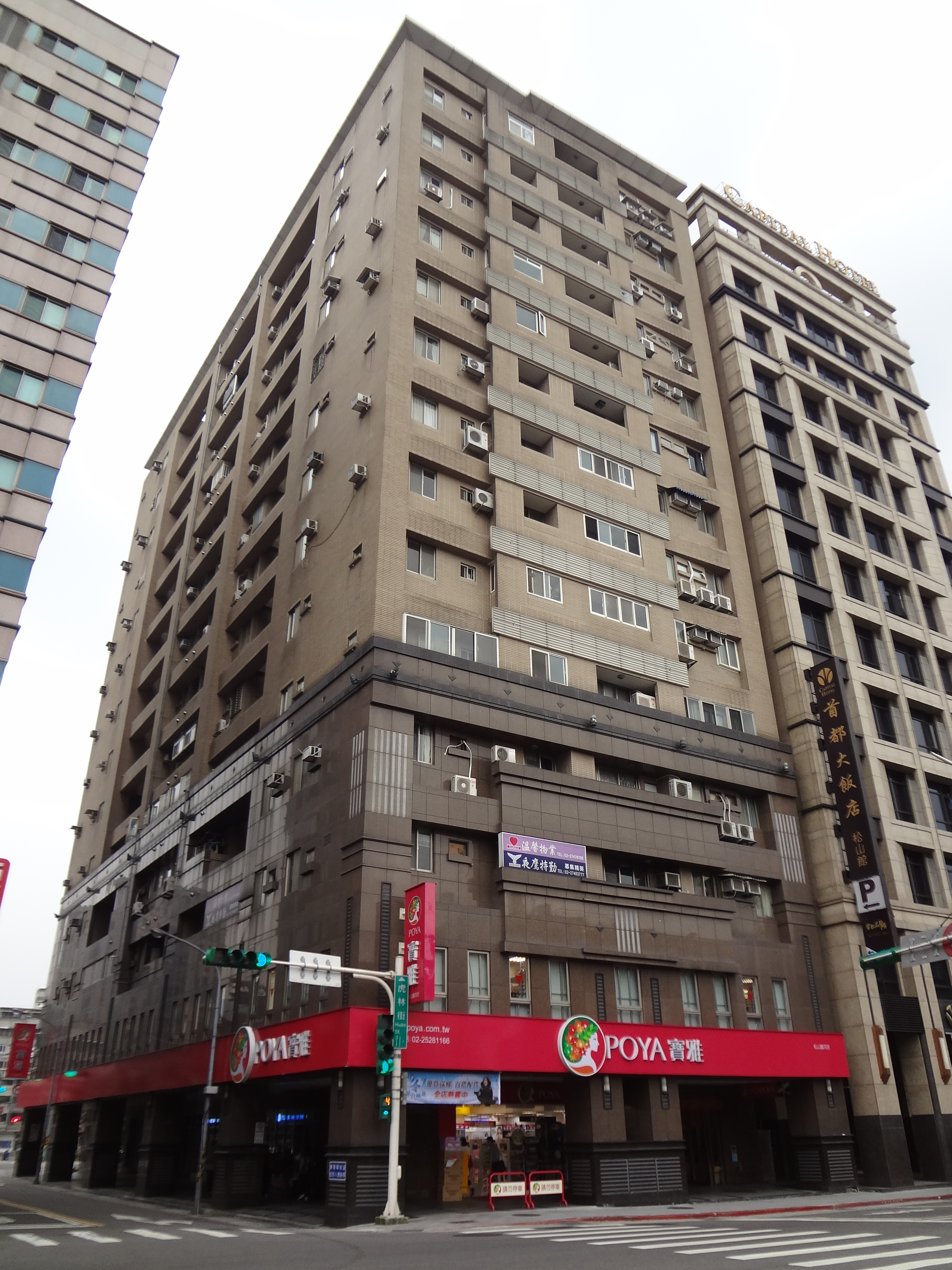
The new building at No. 660, Section 4, Bade Road, Songshan District, Taipei, Taiwan (臺北市松山區八德路四段660號) in 2016

Construction of a new building in the same place was begun in 2004, suspended in 2006 and 2008 because of financial issues faced by the first two contractors assigned to the project, and finally finished in 2009 by a third contractor. The new building was opened on August 29, 2009. At the time, more than 70 out of 84 displaced households were preparing to return.
