= Paul Green (engineer) =

American electrical engineer (1924–2018)

- Born: Paul Eliot Green, Jr. January 14, 1924; Chapel Hill, North Carolina, U.S.
- Died: March 22, 2018 (aged 94); Chapel Hill, North Carolina, U.S.
- Occupation: Electrical engineer
- Years active: 1953–2000

Paul Eliot Green, Jr. (January 14, 1924 – March 22, 2018) was an American electrical engineer who researched spread spectrum and radar technology. He was the son of playwright Paul Green.

== Biography ==
Green was born in Chapel Hill, North Carolina on January 14, 1924. Green majored in physics at the University of North Carolina. He also served in the Naval ROTC and continued in the Navy Reserve for many years, eventually retiring as a lieutenant commander. He received a master's degree in electrical engineering from North Carolina State University in 1948. His masters studies focused on cryptographic research, and were followed by PhD from MIT (1953) from a thesis on spread spectrum, supervised by Wilbur Davenport, Robert Fano, and Jerome Wiesner. This involved co-creating the Rake receiver (with Robert Price) and supervision of its deployment in a first-ever spread-spectrum system, the Lincoln F9C (1950).

Following his studies, Green and Price (at MIT Lincoln Laboratory), attempting to bounce radar waves off the planet Venus (1958). With Gordon Pettengill, he worked out a theory of range-Doppler mapping that was used on the Magellan probe mapping of Venus' surface twenty years later. He also designed the LASA (Large Aperture Seismic Array) for earthquake prediction, first deployed in Montana and Norway (at NORSAR) in 1963.

In 1969, Green became head of IBM Research, communications dept., involved in the Systems Network Architecture, in particular, the Advanced peer-to-peer networking protocol. Since 1988 he headed the optical communications (focusing on wavelength division multiplexing) research group that was acquired by Tellabs company where he worked 1997-2000. Since his retirement, he had lobbied for expanded public access to broadband technology. He died at his home in Chapel Hill, North Carolina on March 22, 2018.

== Publications ==
Green published extensively during his career; major works include Fiber Optic Networks (1992) and Fiber to the Home: The New Empowerment (2005). Since 1981 he authored around 300 CommuniCrostics crosswords in the IEEE Communications Magazine, published as a book in 2008.

- Fiber Optic Networks, 1992
- Fiber to the Home: The New Empowerment, 2005
- CommuniCrostics, 2008

== Honors ==
- Fellow of the Institute of Electrical and Electronics Engineers (1962).
- Aerospace pioneer award (1980).
- Elected to the National Academy of Engineering (1982).
- Simon Ramo medal (1991).
- IEEE Communications Society president (1992–93).
- SIGCOMM Award (1994).
