= Wilbur Davenport =

Wilbur B. Davenport Jr. (July 27, 1920 – August 28, 2003) was a professor emeritus of communication science and engineering at the Massachusetts Institute of Technology (MIT), born in Philadelphia, Pennsylvania.

== Early life and education ==
Davenport earned his bachelor's degree in Electrical Engineering from Alabama Polytechnic Institute, Auburn University in 1941 where he was a member of Sigma Pi fraternity. He received his master's degree in 1943 from MIT and then served from 1943 to 1946 in the U.S. Naval Reserve as a lieutenant (junior grade). He returned to MIT and earned his Ph.D. in 1950, just after being named an assistant professor at the institute in 1949.

== Career ==
He became a full professor from 1960 to 1982. From 1951 he worked with Lincoln Lab as leader of the research group on communications technology. In 1961 he was appointed associate head of the Research Laboratory of Electronics before returning to the Lincoln Lab in 1963. While at the RLE he worked on the spread spectrum techniques on secure communications. In 1974 he was appointed to head MIT's Electrical Engineering Department. While serving as department head he oversaw a curriculum change for computer students and a department name change to the Department of Electrical Engineering and Computer Science. He stepped down from the position after four years.

During this time he was a director for the GenRad Corporation from 1974 to 1982.

After retiring from M.I.T. he moved to Honolulu, Hawaii and became a visiting professor of electrical engineering at the University of Hawaii at Manoa until 1987. He moved to Sunriver, Oregon in that year.

== Publications and awards ==
In 1952 the Journal of Applied Physics published a paper he co-authored titled Statistical Errors in Measurements on Random Time Functions. This was the first of several papers on statistical theory. In the early 1960s the Journal of the Acoustical Society of America published his paper An Experimental Study of Speech-Wave Probability Distribution.

His published books included Probability and Random Processes (1975) and An Introduction to the Theory of Random Signals and Noise with William L. Root (1958).

Davenport was elected to the National Academy of Engineering (1975) and received the IEEE Pioneer Award (1981) for his spread spectrum research with Paul E. Green, Mortimer Rogoff and Louis A. deRosa.

Prof. Davenport's doctoral adviser was Prof. Robert Fano. His notable students: Prof. Victor On-Kwok Li and George L. Turin. He was married to his wife, Joan. They had two children, Mark and Sally.
