= Chelungpu Fault =

Active seismic fault located in Taiwan

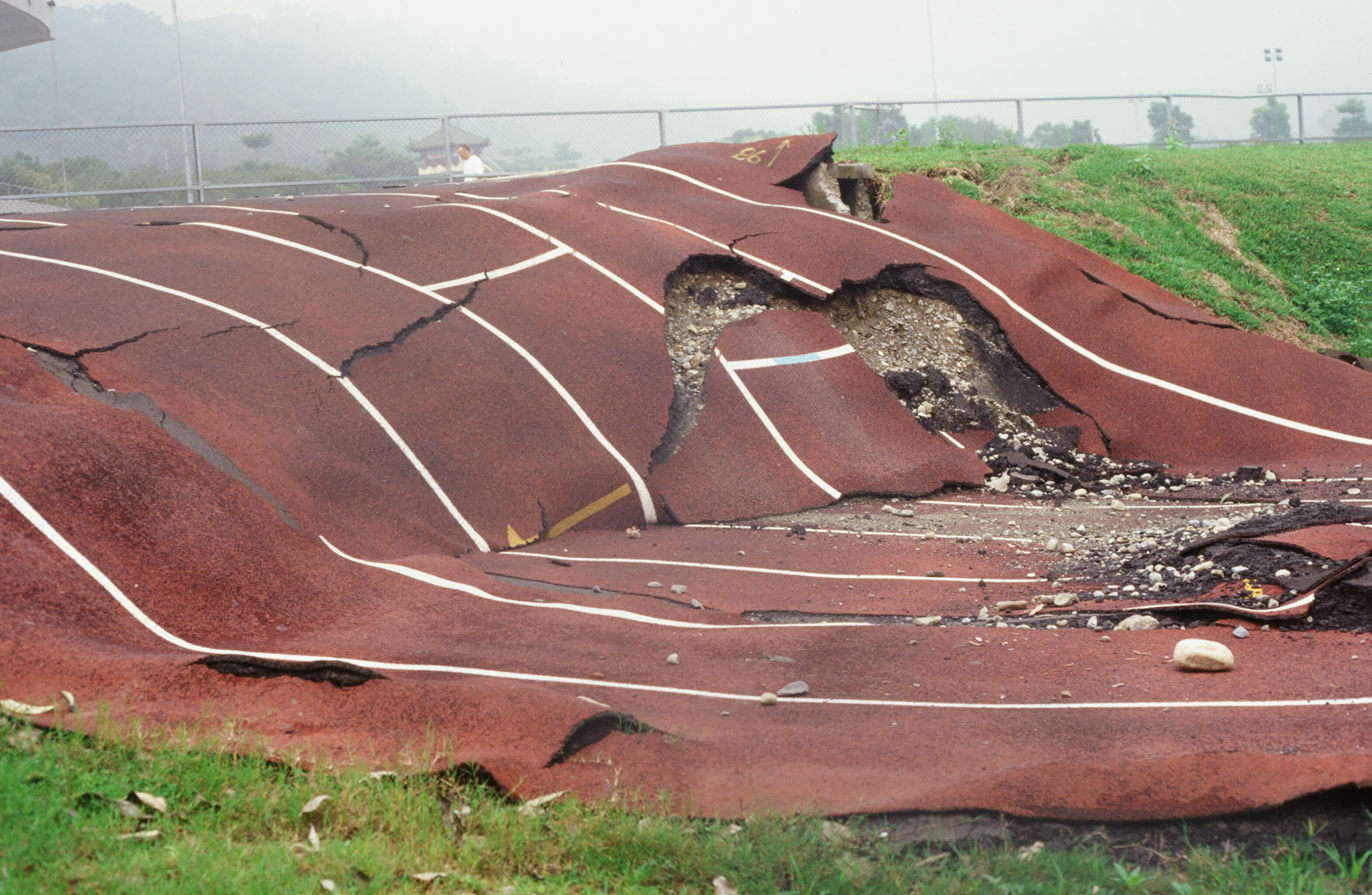
Running track after 1999 Jiji earthquake

The Chelungpu Fault (traditional Chinese: 車籠埔斷層; simplified Chinese: 车笼埔断层; pinyin: Chēlóngbù Duàncéng) is an active fault located in Taiwan. It caused the 1999 Jiji earthquake.

== Characteristics ==
The Chelungpu fault is a North–South-trending fault stretching from Miaoli County, Taiwan south through rural parts of Taichung City and across Nantou County. It is a major 90-km structure with a shallow eastward pointing tilt (30°) and primarily slips within and parallel to the bedding of the Pliocene Chinshui shale.

== 1999 Jiji earthquake ==
The epicenter of the earthquake was Chichi Township. The 1999 Jiji earthquake happened along the Chelungpu fault line in western part of the island of Taiwan. The fault is located along the foothills of the Central Mountains in Nantou and Taichung counties. Some sections of land near the fault were changed in elevation by as much as 7 meters (23 feet). Near the northern end of the fault line, a 7-meter tall waterfall was created by the earthquake. In the middle-western part of the island, bridges were destroyed. This stopped traffic for weeks.

In Wufeng, a village in southern Taichung County, the damage was very bad. The village's Guangfu High School was located on the fault line. It was badly damaged by the quake. Today the high school is the site of the National Museum of Natural Science's 921 Earthquake Museum of Taiwan.

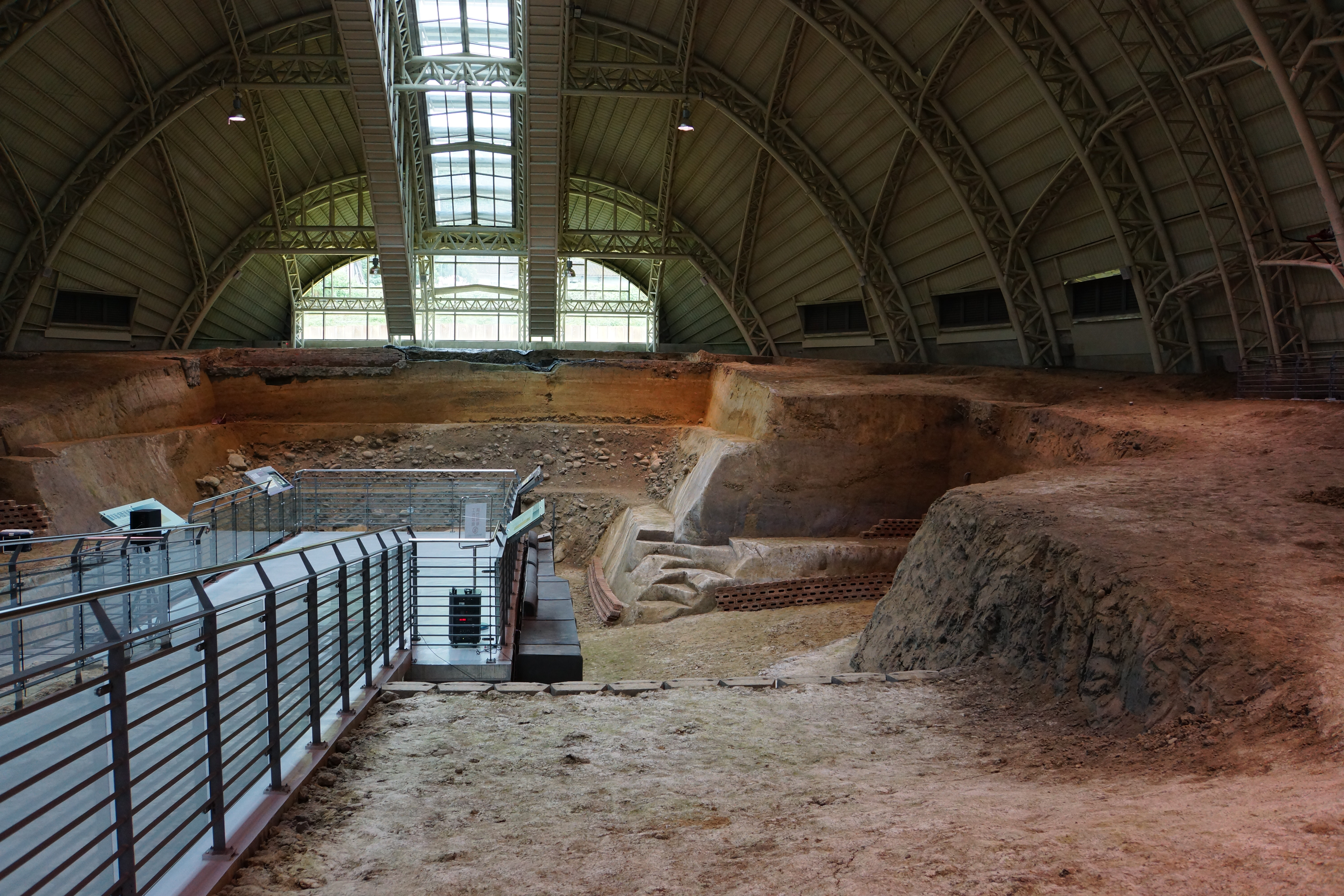
Chelongpu Fault Preservation Park

The fault was reportedly discovered by Dr. Wen-shan Chen, Professor of Geology at National Taiwan University, in November 2002. To preserve the surface rupture, the Chelungpu Fault Preservation Park was established and opened to the public in 2013.

== Research ==
The Chelungpu Fault has unique characteristics that make it an ideal research site, easy to drill and measure. It is a 12-meter long inland thrust fault with a 30 degrees tilt and a 105 km surface rupture.

Taiwanese scholars Kuo-Fong Ma and Yiben Tsai collaborated on the Taiwan Chelungpu-fault Drilling Project (TCDP) with international collaborators in the US and Japan. The purpose of the project was to obtain physical samples of the fault, in particular where large displacements occurred during the 921 earthquake. The team, in part funded by the National Science Council and the International Continental Scientific Drilling Program, drilled research boreholes to investigate the Chelungpu fault, leading to multiple discoveries about the causes of the earthquake. Most notably, the project led to an empirical breakthrough in seismology, measuring the thickness of an earthquake slip zone for the first time.

The drilling project also uncovered that one of the causes of the earthquake was the movement of underground water. The team was the first to characterize this unusual type of earthquake, naming it an "isotropic event," that is, an earthquake-like event caused by natural hydraulic fracturing. Some suggest that this finding has important implications for fracking operations.

== See also ==
- Chelungpu Fault Preservation Park
