= Wanjiun Liao =

Taiwanese electrical engineer and academic administrator

Wanjiun Liao (Chinese: 廖婉君) is a Taiwanese electrical engineer and academic administrator, the executive vice president of National Taiwan University. Her research interests include wireless networks, vehicular ad hoc networks, edge computing, and video on demand.

== Education and career ==
Liao was a student of electrical engineering at National Chiao Tung University, where she earned bachelors and masters degrees in 1990 and 1992 respectively. She completed a PhD in electrical engineering at the University of Southern California in 1997. Her doctoral dissertation, Design and analysis of interactive video-on-demand systems, was supervised by Victor On-kwok Li.

She has been at National Taiwan University since 1997. She became director of the Computer and Information Networking Center in 2002, full professor of electrical engineering in 2005, Distinguished Professor in 2010, Himax Chair Professor in 2013, Y. Z. Hsu Scientific Chair Professor in 2014, National Chair Professor in the Ministry of Education in 2021, and NTU Chair Professor in 2022.

She chaired the Department of Electrical Engineering from 2013 to 2015, served as director general for engineering and technologies in the Ministry of Science and Technology from 2016 to 2017, became Vice President for Academic Affairs of National Taiwan University in 2018, and has been executive vice president of the university since 2023.

== Recognition ==
Liao was a 2003 recipient of the K. T. Li Young Research Award of ACM Taipei. She was named an IEEE Fellow in 2010, "for contributions to communication protocols in multimedia networking". She was a 2011 distinguished lecturer of the IEEE Communications Society and is a 2023 distinguished lecturer of the IEEE Vehicular Technology Society.

In 2025, Liao was awarded the Outstanding Award of the Taiwan Outstanding Women in Science Awards.
