= Robert Price (engineer) =

American electrical engineer

Robert Price (7 July 1929 – 3 December 2008) was an American electrical engineer, known best for his research in spread spectrum and radar technology.

Price was born in West Chester, Pennsylvania. He majored in physics at Princeton University (1950) and then received his Sc.D. from the Massachusetts Institute of Technology (1953). While working in the MIT Lincoln Laboratories, he was the co-creator of the Rake receiver, together with Paul Green. The Rake receiver has been described as "historically the most important adaptive receiver for fading multipath channels." They also supervised its deployment in a first-ever spread-spectrum system, the Lincoln F9C (1950).

Price and Green also attempted to bounce radar waves off the planet Venus (1958). With Gordon Pettengill, the two of them worked out a theory of range-Doppler mapping that was used on the Magellan probe mapping of Venus' surface 20 years later.

In 1965 he left the Lincoln Laboratory to join the Sperry Research Center in Sudbury, Massachusetts. He later worked at M/A-COM Government Systems and at Raytheon.

Price was elected to the National Academy of Engineering (1985). He was a Life Fellow of the IEEE.

== Awards ==
- National Academy of Engineering Fellow Award "For contributions to communication system theory and its use in radar contact with Venus"
- IEEE Communications Society Edwin Howard Armstrong Achievement Award (1981)
- Information Theory Society Golden Jubilee Paper Award for "A Useful Theorem for nonlinear devices having Gaussian inputs" (1988)
