= David Turnbull (materials scientist) =

American materials scientist (1915–2007)

- Born: February 18, 1915; Elmira, Stark County, Illinois, United States
- Died: April 28, 2007 (aged 92); Cambridge, Massachusetts
- Education: Monmouth College; University of Illinois
- Known for: Solidification theory and glass formation
- Awards: Japan Prize
- Scientific career
- Fields: Physical chemistry
- Workplaces: Harvard University
- Thesis: An investigation of various electron emitters for a periodic deviation from the Schottky line (1939)
- Doctoral advisor: Thomas Erwin Phipps
- Doctoral students: Michael Aziz; Robert B. Meyer; Carl V. Thompson
- Other notable students: Li-Chyong Chen

David Turnbull (February 18, 1915 – April 28, 2007) was an American physical chemist who worked in the interdisciplinary fields of materials science and applied physics. Turnbull made seminal contributions to solidification theory and glass formation. Turnbull was born in Elmira, Elmira Township, Stark County, Illinois. He graduated from high school in 1932 and then received a bachelor's degree in 1936 from Monmouth College (Illinois), specializing in physical chemistry. He received his Ph.D. in physical chemistry under Thomas Erwin Phipps from the University of Illinois in 1939. He was on the faculty of Case Institute of Technology from 1939 to 1946 before eventually becoming a professor at Harvard University.

In 1946, he joined the General Electric research laboratory, performing research into nucleation of structural transformations occurring during the solidification of liquid metals, demonstrating that such complex processes could be quantitatively understood. Using a low-melting-point metal, mercury, Turnbull determined that the small supercoolings usually seen were the result of heterogeneous catalysts in the melt. When liquid mercury is dispersed as small droplets, large supercoolings could be achieved. The previously empirical study of metal solidification was provided a consistent scientific foundation.

Turnbull and his General Electric colleagues developed metal alloy processing. Turner and I. S. Servi developed homogeneous nucleation theory for a solid-solid transformation, providing the technologically important basis for strengthening metallic alloys through precipitation hardening. With Morrel H. Cohen, he developed the free volume theory for fluid flow. In 1950, Turnbull formulated a criterion for the ease of glass formation from supercooled melts with a high viscosity by rapid solidification. Independently and simultaneously to Cohen, he predicted the formation of metallic glass phases from sufficiently fast cooling of an alloy melt with a deep eutectic. This was demonstrated by Pol Duwez at Caltech in 1959, who produced thin micron-sized sheets of an Au-Si alloy using a very high cooling rate (approximately 10^{6} K/s). H.S. Chen showed in 1971 that mm-sized glassy rods (so-called "bulk metallic glass," or BMG) of Pd-Cu-Si could be produced by suction casting with a cooling rate of 1000 K/s. In 1982, Turnbull then demonstrated that a bulk metallic glass could be produced in the Pd-Ni-P system with a cooling rate as low as 100 K/s.

In 1955, Turnbull and Frederick Seitz published the first edition of Solid State Physics, a yearly series now published by Elsevier.

In 1962, Turnbull joined Harvard University as the Gordon McKay Professor of applied physics, where he taught for 23 years. One of his graduate students at Harvard described him as follows: "As a physicist, manager, psychologist and philosopher, he combines the erudition of a Renaissance scholar with the expert knowledge of a 20th century man of Science." He was elected to the National Academy of Sciences in 1968, was a Fellow of the American Academy of Arts and Sciences, and was awarded the Japan Prize in 1986 "for pioneering contributions to material science". He received the Franklin Medal in 1990.

David Turnbull died on April 28, 2007, at the age of 92, in his home in Cambridge, Massachusetts. He was survived by two sons and a daughter.
