= Kuo-Fong Ma =

Taiwanese seismologist

- Born: 1963 (age 62–63); Taiwan
- Education: National Central University (BS); National Taiwan University (MS); California Institute of Technology (PhD)
- Known for: Earthquake seismology, Earthquake physics, Engineering and seismotectonics
- Scientific career
- Fields: Seismology
- Thesis: The origin of tsunamis excited by local earthquakes. Broadband waveform observation of local earthquakes. (1993)
- Doctoral advisor: Hiroo Kanamori

Kuo-Fong Ma (Note: In this Chinese name, the family name is Ma.) (Chinese: 馬國鳳; pinyin: Mǎ Guó Fèng, born 1963) is a Taiwanese seismologist. She is primarily known for research conducted on the Chelungpu Fault, the cause of one of the most devastating earthquakes in Taiwan, the 1999 Jiji earthquake.

== Early life and education ==
Ma was born in 1963 at Su'ao, Taiwan. She graduated from National Central University in 1985 and received her master's degree in oceanography in 1987 from National Taiwan University. She then completed doctoral studies in the United States, earning her Ph.D. in seismology from the California Institute of Technology in 1993.

== Career ==
She is currently the Chief Scientist of the Taiwan Earthquake Research Center, a Distinguished Research Fellow at the Institute of Earth Sciences, Academia Sinica, a professor in the Earth Sciences Department of National Central University, and the founder and Director of the Earthquake- Disaster & Risk Evaluation and Risk Management (E-DREaM) Center. She is also a member of the Global Earthquake Model.

Ma was one of the Ten Outstanding Young Women of Republic of China of the year 2000 and received the Academic Award of Ministry of Education in 2007. In 2011, she was awarded a Taiwan Outstanding Women in Science (TOWIS) prize and the annual science prize from the Chien-Shiung Wu Education Foundation.

In 2011, Ma was awarded the Outstanding Award of the Taiwan Outstanding Women in Science Awards.

She received a Ministry of Education National Chair Professorship in 2013. In 2019, she was elected as a fellow of the American Geophysical Union.

== Research ==
Ma led the "Taiwan Chelungpu Fault Drilling Project," which explored the causes of the 1999 Jiji earthquake that occurred in central Taiwan on September 21, 1999. Her team was the first to measure the actual thickness of earthquake slip zones, a key parameter in understanding earthquake energy release. Her research implied that the causes of the 921 earthquake is cyclical in nature, predicting a similar one in 400 years.

Analyses of the earthquake also led to the first characterization of earthquakes caused by the movement of underground water. The team defined this unusual type of earthquake as an "isotropic event," an earthquake-like event caused by natural hydraulic fracturing. This finding might have implications for fracking operations.

Ma established a Taiwan Earthquake Committee to chart earthquake models of Taiwan (the Taiwan Earthquake Model project). In 2018, she created the Earthquake Disaster & Risk Evaluation and Management Center (E-DREaM), an agency that brings together experts and scholars in the disaster chains to analyze the risk factors of events such as earthquakes, tsunami, landslides, soil liquefaction, and extreme weather systems.

== Key publications ==
- Ma, K. F., Chen, C. C., Hung, H. J., & Chen, M. T. (1993). The origin of tsunamis excited by local earthquakes. Broadband waveform observation of local earthquakes.
- Ma, K. F., Chen, M. T., & Hung, H. J. (1998). The origin of the 1994 Taiwan earthquakes.
- Ma, K. F., Mori, J., Lee, S. J., & Yu, S. B. (2001). Spatial and temporal distribution of slip for the 1999 Chi-Chi, Taiwan, earthquake. Bulletin of the Seismological Society of America, 91(5), 1069–1087.
- Ma, K. F., Tanaka, H., Song, S. R., Wang, C. Y., Hung, J. H., Tsai, Y. B., ... & Wu, H. Y. (2006). Slip zone and energetics of a large earthquake from the Taiwan Chelungpu-fault Drilling Project. Nature, 444(7118), 473–476.
- Ma, K. F., Lin, Y. Y., Lee, S. J., Mori, J., & Brodsky, E. E. (2012). Isotropic events observed with a borehole array in the Chelungpu fault zone, Taiwan. Science, 337(6093), 459–463.
