= Chelungpu Fault Preservation Park =

Park in Zhushan, Nantou, Taiwan

- 車籠埔斷層保存園區
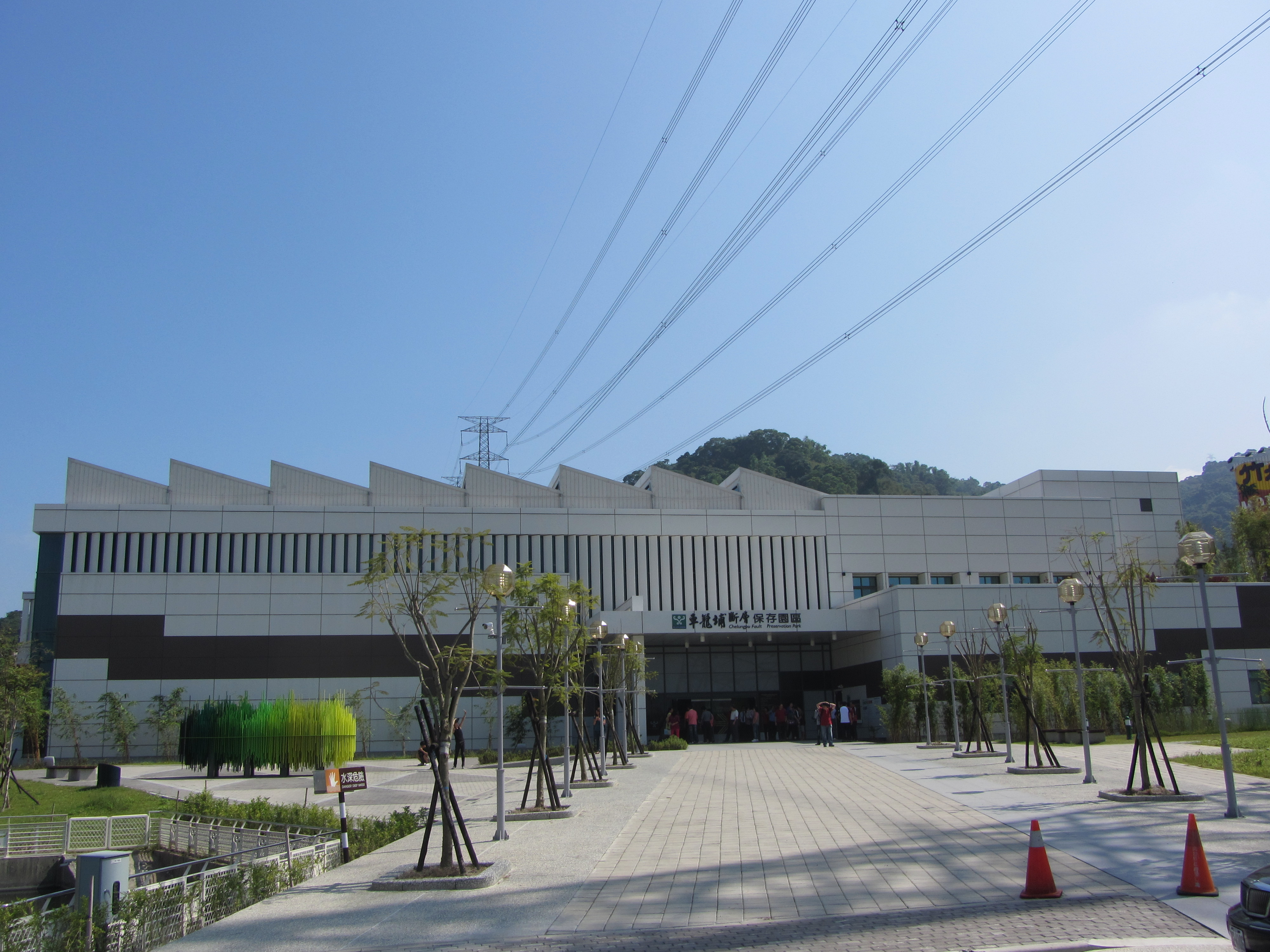
- Interactive map of Chelungpu Fault Preservation Park
- Location: Zhushan, Nantou County, Taiwan
- Coordinates: 23°47′41.0″N 120°42′38.2″E

Construction
- Opened: 1 May 2013

Website
- Official website

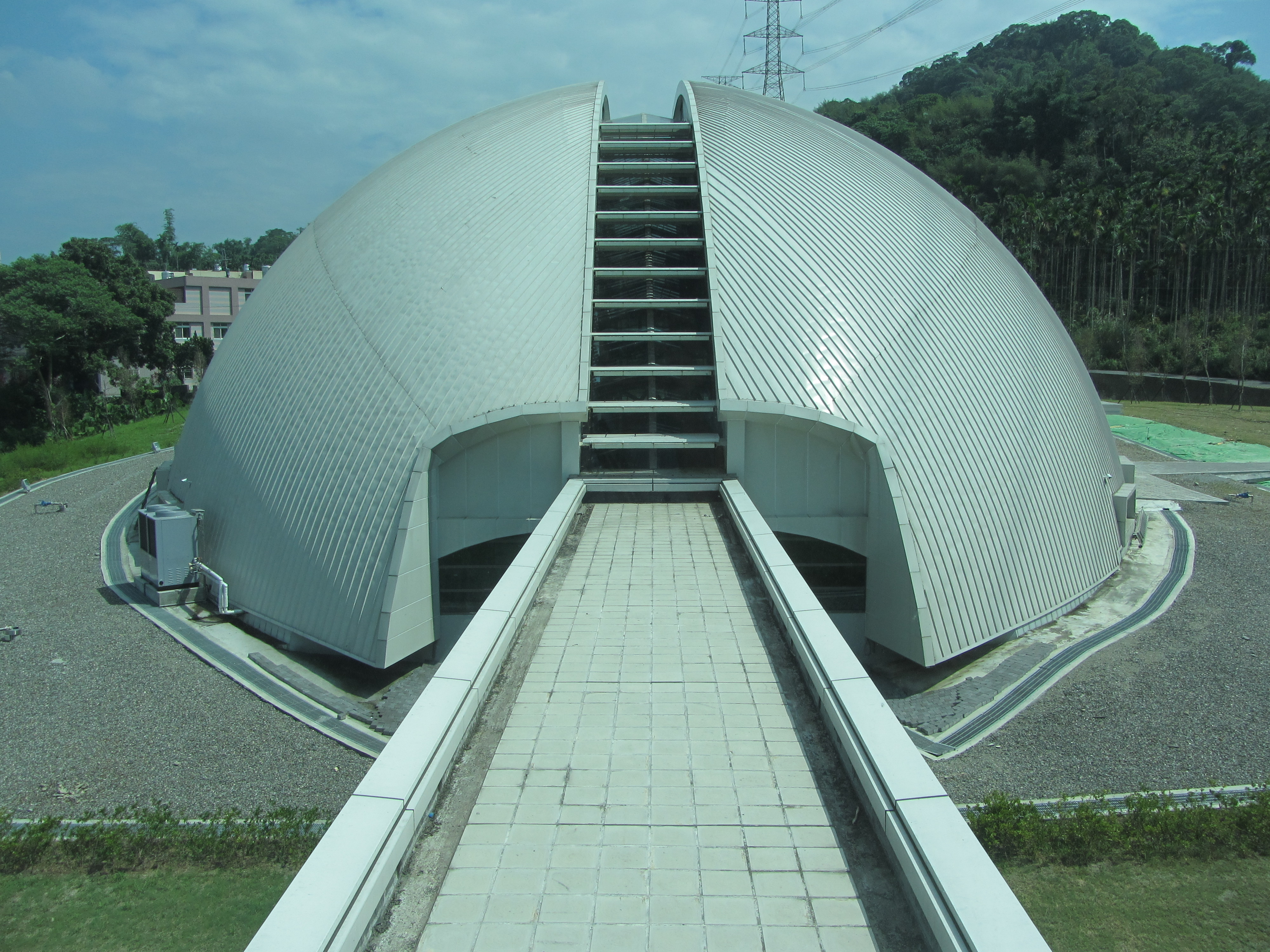
Fault Preservation Hall

The Chelungpu Fault Preservation Park (traditional Chinese: 車籠埔斷層保存園區; simplified Chinese: 车笼埔断层保存园区; pinyin: Chēlóngbù Duàncéng Bǎocún Yuánqū) is a park in Zhushan Township, Nantou County, Taiwan established to commemorate the 21 September 1999 earthquake. It is the subordinate park to the National Museum of Natural Science.

== History ==
The establishment of the museum begin in November 2002 when Dr. Chen Wen-shan, a professor of geology from National Taiwan University, discovered the original Chelungpu Fault caused by the earthquake in 1999 while conducting his investigation into the major earthquakes that struck Taiwan over the past years. The Chelungpu Fault Preservation Park was created to preserve the fault and was opened to the public for testing operation on 30 January 2013 and officially opened for regular operation on 1 May the same year.

== Exhibition ==
The gallery displays the thrust fault caused by the 1999 earthquake. It also displays various aspects of geological science in its Geoscience Hall, such as fossils, trench layers etc.

== See also ==
- 921 Earthquake Museum of Taiwan
- National Museum of Natural Science
- List of tourist attractions in Taiwan
