= Jacqueline Whang-Peng =

Taiwanese-American physician-scientist

- 彭汪嘉康
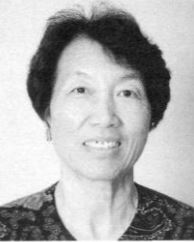
- Born: September 1932 (age 93–94); Suzhou, Jiangsu, China
- Citizenship: Taiwan; United States
- Education: Taipei Medical University (MD)
- Children: 4
- Awards: Arthur S. Flemming Award (1972)
- Scientific career
- Fields: Cytogenetics, cancer research
- Workplaces: National Cancer Institute

Jacqueline Jia-Kang Whang-Peng (Chinese: 彭汪嘉康; pinyin: Péng Wāng Jiākāng; born September 1932) is a Taiwanese-American physician-scientist specialized in cytogenetics of cancer, as well as medical genetics, genetic oncology, and gene mapping. She was a researcher at the National Cancer Institute from 1960 to 1993.

== Early life and education ==
Jacqueline Jia-Kang Whang-Peng was born in Suzhou. Whang-Peng completed a M.D. from Taipei Medical University in 1956. From 1955 to 1957, she was an intern and fixed intern in surgery at the National Taiwan University Hospital. She was at New England Hospital as an intern resident and chief resident in surgery. She then served a residency at Quincy City Hospital in pathology and at George Washington University Hospital in internal medicine before joining the National Institutes of Health (NIH) in 1960.

== Career ==
Whang-Peng joined the medicine branch of the National Cancer Institute (NCI) in 1960. By 1968, she was a senior investigator in the NCI's clinical trial area. In 1972, she was a senior investigator in NCI's Human Tumor Cell Biology Branch, where she conducted cytogenetic research aimed at explaining cellular control mechanisms in human cancer.

Whang-Peng has been recognized for her work in cytogenetics by investigators all over the world. She published more than 200 scientific articles. Whang-Peng has instructed a number of senior professionals in this field. In 1972, she was associate editor of the Journal of the National Cancer Institute. As of 1993, Whang-Peng has served on the editorial board of the journal Genes, Chromosomes and Cancer since 1989. Whang-Peng is a member of the Reticuloendothelial Society, American Society of Hematology, American Association for the Advancement of Science, and the Foundation for Advanced Education in the Sciences.

Whang-Peng was chief of the cytogenetic oncology section in the NCI's Medicine Branch when she retired on December 31, 1993. She returned to Taiwan to help in clinical trials in liver and cervical cancers.

=== Research ===
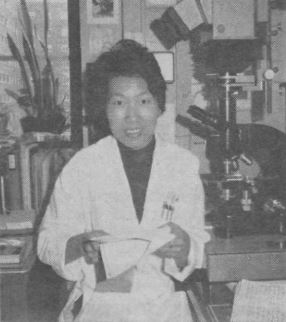
Whang-Peng at the NCI

In collaboration with Joe Hin Tjio of the National Institute of Arthritis and Metabolic Diseases, she developed a technique for t he preparation of mammalian cells for the study of their chromosome complement. This technique is now utilized by many investigators and is considered responsible for much of the progress that has been made in the area.

She was the primary consultant to other NIH investigators on diseases of inborn errors of metabolism and in diseases with inherited or congenital abnormalities. She devoted a good deal of her time to research on the kinetics and biology of leukemia cells. Whang-Peng showed that immature leukemic blood leukocytes are capable of maturing and differentiating in tissue culture and that these cells are capable of phagocytosis. Her studies have important implications in understanding leukemia and in treating patients with this disease. Her research interests center on determining cytogenetic differences between cancerous and normal cells, as well as medical genetics, genetic oncology, and gene mapping.

Her studies of the Burkitt lymphoma have revealed the presence of a specific chromosome alteration in both the cells from the original tumor and in tumor cells after culture.

== Awards and honors ==
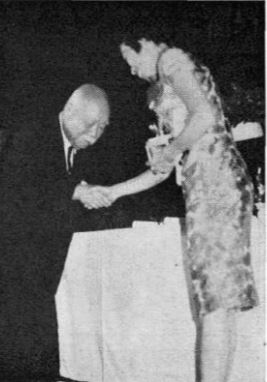
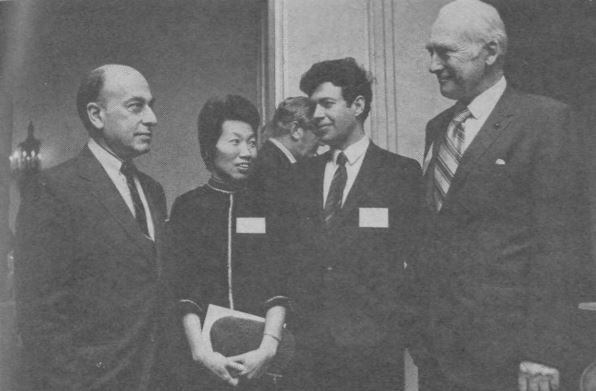
Whang-Peng receiving the "Woman of the Year" award from Wang Yun-wu (left) and Wang receiving the Flemming award (right).

Whang-Peng was honored by the Lions Clubs International and the China Daily News. In 1968, Whang-Peng was named Woman of the Year in medicine by the Republic of China for her work in malignant cell biology an chromosomes in human malignancy. Her award was presented by former Vice Premier Wang Yun-wu. In 1972, Whang-Peng was one of the first two women to receive the Arthur S. Flemming Award. She was elected a member of Academia Sinica in 1984. Whang-Peng received scientific awards from the Chinese American Medical Society (1985), Organization of Chinese Americans (1989); and a PHS Commendation Award in 1989.

== Personal life ==
Whang-Peng became a U.S. citizen in June 1970. She is married to George Peng, a mechanical engineer. They have four children.
