= List of disasters in Taiwan by death toll =

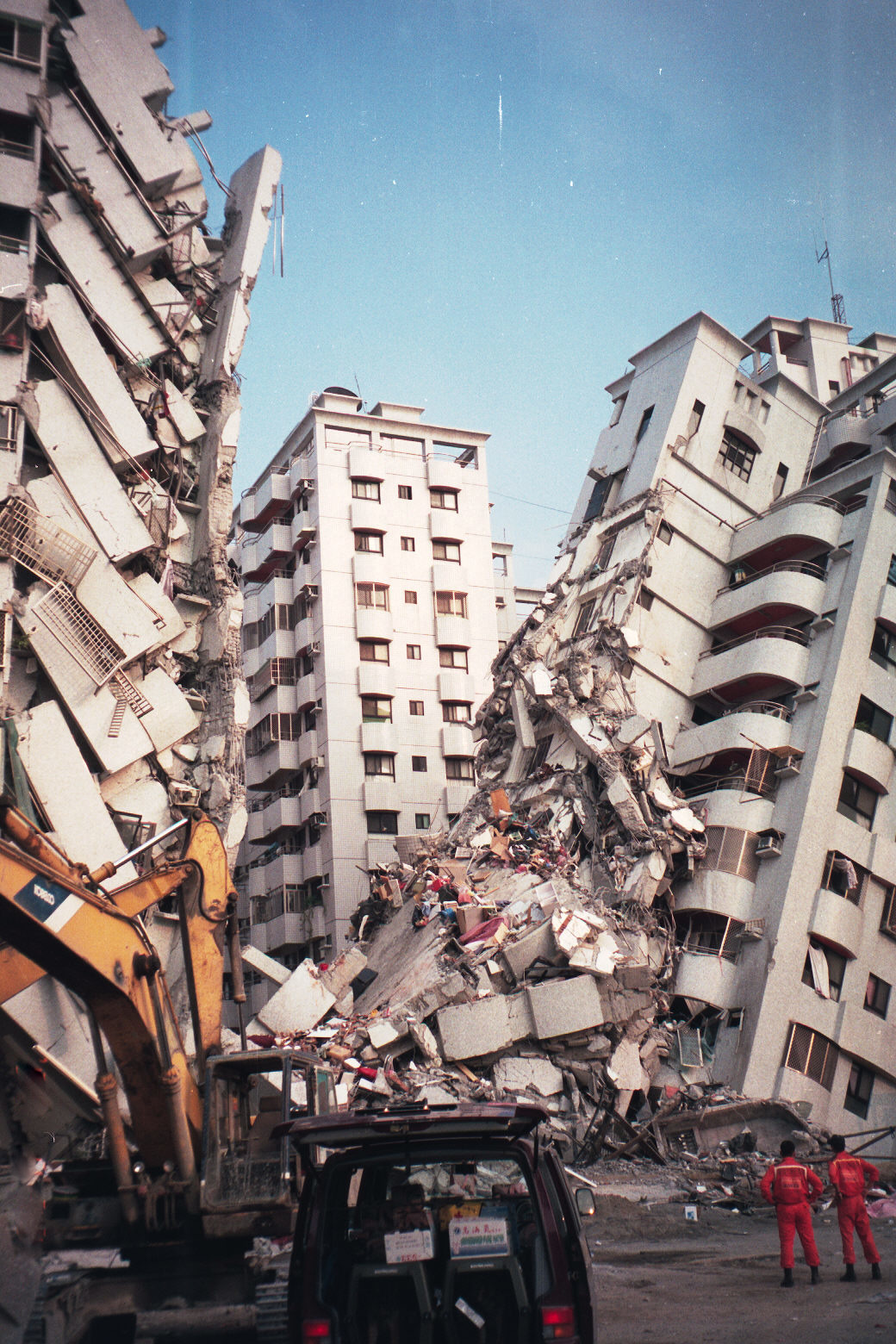
Aftermath of the 1999 Jiji earthquake.

This list of Taiwanese disasters by death toll includes major disasters (excluding acts of war) that occurred on Taiwanese soil or involved Taiwanese citizens, in a definable incident, where the loss of life was 10 or more.

== 200 or more deaths ==
Fatalities	Year	Article	Type	Location	Comments
44,638	1918-1920	Spanish Flu	Pandemic	Nationwide	
19,039	2020-2023	COVID-19 in Taiwan	Pandemic	Nationwide	
3,276	1935	1935 Shinchiku-Taichū earthquake	Earthquake	Northwest Taiwan	
3,000+	1845	Huneigang Storm Tide	Storm surge	Yunlin County	
2,671	1955-1977	1955-77 Polio epidemic	Epidemic	Nationwide	
2,415	1999	1999 Jiji earthquake	Earthquake	Central Taiwan	
2,210	1946	1946 Cholera epidemic	Epidemic	Nationwide	
1,258-1,266	1906	1906 Meishan earthquake	Earthquake	South central Taiwan	
1,030	1848	1848 Changhua Earthquake	Earthquake	Changhua County	
782	1948-1958	1948-58 Rabies outbreak	Disease outbreak	Nationwide	
699	2009	Typhoon Morakot	Typhoon	Southern and eastern Taiwan	
667	1959	August 7 Flood	Flood	Central and southern Taiwan	
617	1792	Chiayi Earthquake of 1792	Earthquake	Chiayi County	
580	1867	1867 Keelung earthquake	Earthquake	Keelung	
500-1,700	1862	1862 Tainan Earthquake	Earthquake	Tainan	
381	1845	1845 Taichung Earthquake	Earthquake	Taichung	
372	1736	1736 Tainan Earthquake	Earthquake	Tainan	
363	1963	Typhoon Gloria	Typhoon	Northern Taiwan	
358	1941	1941 Chungpu earthquake	Earthquake	Chiayi County	
293	1961	Typhoon Pamela	Typhoon	Eastern Taiwan	
270	1879	Sinking of the S.S. New Taiwan	Maritime disaster	Paracel Islands (disputed)	
225	2002	China Airlines Flight 611	Plane crash	Taiwan Strait offshore of Penghu County	
220	1957	1957 Diphtheria epidemic	Epidemic	Nationwide	
214	2015	2015 dengue outbreak in Taiwan	Disease outbreak	Southern Taiwan	
214	2001	Typhoon Toraji	Typhoon	Eastern and central Taiwan	
207	1908	Sinking of the Matsushima	Maritime disaster	Magong, Penghu County	
202	1998	China Airlines Flight 676	Plane crash	Taoyuan	

== 100 to 199 deaths ==
Fatalities	Year	Article	Type	Location	Comments
153	1952	Typhoon Bess	Typhoon	Southern Taiwan	
145	1904	1904 Douliu earthquake	Earthquake	Yunlin County	
143	1970	Typhoon Fran	Typhoon	Northern Taiwan	
130	1892	Sinking of the SS Bokhara	Maritime disaster	Penghu County	
117	2016	2016 southern Taiwan earthquake	Earthquake	Southern Taiwan	
117	1839	1839 Chiayi Earthquake	Earthquake	Chiayi County	
113	1815	1815 Tamsui earthquake	Earthquake	New Taipei	
110	1981	Far Eastern Air Transport Flight 103	Plane crash	Sanyi Township, Miaoli County	
106	1964	1964 Baihe earthquake	Earthquake	Southern Taiwan	
105	1969	Typhoon Elsie	Typhoon	Northern and eastern Taiwan	
104	2001	Typhoon Nari	Typhoon	Northern Taiwan	
104	1960	Typhoon Shirley	Typhoon	Northern and eastern Taiwan	
103	1984	Meishan coal mine fire	Mine disaster	Ruifang District, New Taipei	
100	1956	Sinking of The Second Guangsheng	Maritime disaster	Offshore of Wangan Township, Penghu County	

== 99 to 10 deaths ==
Fatalities	Year	Article	Type	Location	Comments
99	1982-1983	1982-83 Polio epidemic	Epidemic		
93	1984	Haishan Coal Mine No. 1 Pit Explosion	Mine disaster	Sanxia District, New Taipei	
87	1962	Typhoon Opal	Typhoon	Northern and eastern Taiwan	
87	1986	Typhoon Wayne	Typhoon	Central and western Taiwan	
85	1951	1951 East Rift Valley earthquakes	Earthquake series	Eastern Taiwan	
83	2000	Singapore Airlines Flight 006	Plane crash	Taoyuan	
82	1967	Typhoon Clara	Typhoon	Northern and central Taiwan	
81	2003	2002-2004 SARS outbreak	Pandemic	Nationwide	
81	1951	Typhoon Pat	Typhoon	Southern Taiwan	
78	1998	Enterovirus (E7) outbreak	Disease outbreak		
74	1946	1946 Hsinhua earthquake	Earthquake	Southwest Taiwan	
74	1951	Caolingtan dam collapse	Dam collapse	Meishan Township, Chiayi County	
73	1951	1951 Floods	Floods	Central and southern Taiwan	
73	1996	Typhoon Herb	Typhoon	Northern and central Taiwan	
72-74	1984	Haishan Coal Mine Explosion	Mine disaster	Tucheng District, New Taipei	
72	1977	Typhoon Thelma	Typhoon	Southern Taiwan	
71	1916-1917	1916–1917 Nantou earthquakes	Earthquake series	Central Taiwan	
68	1973	Typhoon Nora	Typhoon	Southern Taiwan	
64	1948	Xindian Bridge train fire	Train fire	Banqiao District, New Taipei	
64	2000	Typhoon Xangsane	Typhoon	Northern and eastern Taiwan	
64	1995	Weierkang Club fire	Building fire	Taichung	
62	1957	Typhoon Virginia	Typhoon	Northern and eastern Taiwan	
62	1965	Typhoon Dinah	Typhoon	Southern and eastern Taiwan	
61	1961	Chenggong-1 accident	Naval training disaster	Offshore of Kaohsiung	
60	1968	Typhoon Elaine	Typhoon	Northern Taiwan	
59	1956	Typhoon Dinah	Typhoon	Northern Taiwan	
58	1951	Luodi Mountain landing exercise disaster	Naval training disaster	Kaohsiung	
57	1964	Civil Air Transport Flight 106	Plane crash	Taichung	
57	1990	Sinking of the Xinye	Ship sinking	Sun Moon Lake, Yuchi Township, Nantou County	
56	1897	1897 Yilan Earthquake	Earthquake	Yilan County	
54	1974	Typhoon Wendy	Typhoon	Northern and eastern Taiwan	
54	1989	China Airlines Flight 204	Plane crash	Xincheng Township, Hualien County	
52	1971	Typhoon Nadine	Typhoon	Eastern Taiwan	
51	1945	Sancha Mountain Incident	Plane crash and rescue disaster	Sancha Mountain, Central Taiwan	
49	2021	2021 Hualien train derailment	Train derailment	Xiulin Township, Hualien County	
49	1942	Qixing Mine Explosion (1942)	Mine disaster	Keelung	
48	1953	Typhoon Nina	Typhoon	Northern Taiwan	
48	2014	TransAsia Airways Flight 222	Plane crash	Huxi Township, Penghu County	
48	1961	1961 Chiayi County level crossing accident	Level crossing accident	Chiayi County	
48	1953	Sinking of the Liansheng	Maritime disaster	Offshore of Dongji Island, Wangan Township, Penghu County	
48	1981	Severe Tropical Storm Maury	Typhoon	Northern Taiwan	
46	2021	2021 Kaohsiung building fire	Arson	Kaohsiung	
45	1961	Banping Mountain landslide	Landslide	Kaohsiung	
45	1997	Typhoon Winnie	Typhoon	Northern Taiwan	
45	2004	Typhoon Mindulle	Typhoon	Southern and central Taiwan	
44	1935	July 17, 1935 Earthquake	Earthquake (aftershock)	Miaoli County	
44	2023	2023 Dengue fever outbreak	Disease outbreak	Tainan	
44	1990	Typhoon Ofelia	Typhoon	Eastern Taiwan	
43	2015	TransAsia Airways Flight 235	Plane crash	Nangang District, Taipei	
43	1958	Typhoon Winnie	Typhoon	Northern and eastern Taiwan	
42	1986	Guguan tour bus accident	Bus crash	Taichung	
42	1987	Typhoon Lynn	Typhoon	Nationwide	
41	1976	1976 Changhua County level crossing accident	Level crossing accident	Changhua County	
41	1971	Qixing Mine Explosion (1971)	Mine disaster	Keelung	
40	1953	Nanshijiao Ammunition Depot Explosion	Explosion	Zhonghe District, New Taipei	
40	1963	Jinxing Fireworks Factory Explosion	Explosion	Taoyuan	
40	1990	Hongguang Company explosion	Explosion	Taichung	
39	1971	Typhoon Bess	Typhoon	Northeastern Taiwan	
38	1998	Typhoon Zeb	Typhoon	Northern and eastern Taiwan	
38	2010	Typhoon Megi	Typhoon	Eastern and central Taiwan	
37	1989	Typhoon Sarah	Typhoon	Eastern Taiwan	
36	1969	Far Eastern Air Transport Flight 104	Plane crash	Tainan	
35	2009	2009 swine flu pandemic	Pandemic	Nationwide	
35	1953	Typhoon Kit	Typhoon		
34	1980	Yongan coal mine flood	Mine disaster	New Taipei	
33	1983	ROCAF Flight 3197 crash	Plane crash	Jinhu Township, Fuchien Province	
33	1979	Fuyuan Street building explosion	Explosion	Songshan District, Taipei	
33	2004	Typhoon Aere	Typhoon		
33	2017	Butterfly Lovers Tour Bus accident	Bus crash	Nangang District, Taipei	
33	1993	Lun Qing Western Restaurant fire	Arson	Zhongshan District, Taipei	
32	2014	2014 Kaohsiung gas explosion	Explosion	Kaoshiung	
32	1977	Sinking of the Tugboat TY16	Maritime disaster	Suao Township, Yilan County	
31	1949	Typhoon Irma	Typhoon	Eastern Taiwan	
31	1965	Typhoon Mary	Typhoon	Eastern Taiwan	
31	1975	Xingzhong Street explosion	Explosion	Taichung	
31	1966	Xinsheng building fire	Building fire	Taipei	
30	1991	1991 Miaoli train collision	Train collision	Zaoqiao Township, Miaoli County	
30	1961	Sinking of the Tien Hsiang	Maritime disaster	Kaohsiung	
30	1959	Typhoon Billie	Typhoon	Northern Taiwan	
30	2001	Typhoon Chebi	Typhoon	Southern and western Taiwan	
30	1981	Touqian River Bridge derailment	Train derailment	Hsinchu City	
30	1999	Typhoon Yancy	Typhoon	Northern and eastern Taiwan	
30	1994	Typhoon Tim	Typhoon	Central and southern Taiwan	
29	1975	Typhoon Nina	Typhoon	Central and Northern Taiwan	
29	1965	Taoyuan Yongan Elementary School bus crash	Bus crash	Yangmingshan, Taipei	
29	1953	Sinking of the Third Haisheng	Maritime disaster	Offshore of Dongji Island, Wangang Township, Penghu County	
29	1976	Taiwan Railways Express and Tanwen Express collision	Train collision	Miaoli County	
29	1969	Ruifang Coal Mine Explosion	Mine disaster	Ruifang District, New Taipei	
28	1990	Zhengfa building fire	Building fire	Taoyuan	
28	1986	Taichi Canyon rockfall	Rockfall	Zhushan Township, Nantou County	
27	1961	Longtian level crossing accident	Level crossing accident	Tainan	
27	1959	Typhoon Joan	Typhoon	Central Taiwan	
27	1975	Far Eastern Air Transport Flight 134	Plane crash	Songshan District, Taipei	
27	1972	Typhoon Betty	Typhoon	Northern Taiwan	
27	1964	Chengfu coal mine explosion	Mine disaster	Sanxia District, New Taipei	
27	1995	Lion Forest KTV Fire	Building fire	Pingtung City, Pingtung County	
26	1985	Emperor Hotel fire	Arson	Tainan	
26	1983	Fengyuan High School auditorium collapse	Building collapse	Taichung	
26	2008	Typhoon Kalmaegi	Typhoon	Northern Taiwan	
26	2016	2016 Taoyuan bus fire	Arson	Taoyuan	
25	1964	Sanjin Sulfur Mine landslide	Landslide	Beitou District, Taipei	
25	1968	Typhoon Wendy	Typhoon	Southern Taiwan	
25	1938	Sinking of the Mitori Maru	Maritime disaster	Offshore of Toucheng Township, Yilan County	
25	1961	1961 Kaohsiung level crossing accident	Level crossing accident	Kaohsiung	
25	1971	China Airlines Flight 825	Plane crash	Penghu County	
25	1973	Sinking of the Gaozhong No. 6	Maritime disaster	Offshore of Kaohsiung	
24	1969	China Airlines Flight 227	Plane crash	Beidawu Mountain, Pingtung County	
24	2025	Typhoon Ragasa	Typhoon	Taiwan	
24	1989	Kowloon Life Building fire	Arson	Kaohsiung	
23	1977	Lugu Township tour bus crash	Bus accident	Lugu Township, Nantou County	
23	1958	Tianran Firecracker Factory Explosion	Explosion	Chiayi	
23	1992	Healthy Kindergarten Bus Fire	Bus fire	Taoyuan	
22	1962	Tainan Canal Dragon Boat Race accident	Capsizing	Tainan	
22	1968	Civil Air Transport Flight 10	Plane crash	Linkou District, New Taipei	
22	2006	Meiling tour bus accident	Bus accident	Tainan	
22	1980	Lianxing No. 22 drill accident	Oil disaster	Kaohsiung	
22	1987	Yangde Avenue tour bus crash	Bus accident	Shilin District, Taipei	
22	2005	Xinhuang Chemical Pharmaceutical Company explosion	Explosion	Taichung	
22	1967	Typhoon Clara	Typhoon		
21	1962	1962 Diphtheria epidemic	Epidemic		
21	2024-present	Melioidosis outbreak	Disease outbreak		
21	2000	Sinking of the Hualien No. 1	Maritime disaster	Offshore of New Taipei	
21	1956	Typhoon Freda	Typhoon		
21	1811	Chiayi Earthquake of 1811	Earthquake	Chiayi County	
21	1993	Carlton Barber's Shop fire	Arson	Zhongshan District, Taipei	
20	1975	Typhoon Betty	Typhoon	Northern Taiwan	
20	1972	Dahua Institute of Technology graduation tour bus crash	Bus accident	Yilan County	
20	2024	2024 Hualien earthquake	Earthquake	Hualien County	
20	1959	Shinkei Palace truck crash	Truck crash	Lugu Township, Nantou County	
20	1990	Ziqiang Bowling Center fire	Building fire	Zhonghe District, New Taipei	
19	1994	Typhoon Doug	Typhoon	Northern Taiwan	
19	1960	Touqianxi Estuary ferry disaster	Ferry disaster	Zhubei, Hsinchu County	
19	1984	The Times hotel fire	Building fire	Zhongshan District, Taipei	
18	1962	Typhoon Kate	Typhoon	Eastern Taiwan	
18	1985	Sinking of the Haiqiang	Maritime disaster	Offshore of Xiyu Township, Penghu County	
18	1966	Typhoon Judy	Typhoon	Southern Taiwan	
18	1991	Sinking of the Golden Dragon No. 1	Maritime disaster	Offshore of Baisha Township, Penghu County	
18	1990	1990 ROCAF B-1900 crash	Plane crash	Yilan County	
18	1989	21st Century Visual Center fire	Building fire	Taoyuan	
18	2005	Sinking of the Ruitai No. 8	Maritime disaster	Offshore of Suao Township, Yilan County	
18	1958	Qiyi coal mine cable car accident	Mine disaster	New Taipei	
18	1957	Yingge train derailment	Train derailment	Yingge District, New Taipei	
18	2018	2018 Yilan train derailment	Train derailment	Suao Township, Yilan County	
18	1991	Tianlong Sauna Fire	Building fire	Datong District, Taipei	
18	1992	Citi Hotel fire	Building fire	Kaohsiung	
17	2003	2003 Alishan train derailment	Train derailment	Alishan Township, Chiayi County	
17	1980	Tri-Mountain National Scenic Area tour bus crash	Bus accident	Taichung	
17	1991	Bade Road Sauna Fire	Building fire	Kaohsiung	
17	2018	2018 Hualien earthquake	Earthquake	Hualien County	
17	1956	Typhoon Wanda	Typhoon	Northern Taiwan	
17	1996	1996 Taichung sauna fire	Building fire	Taichung	
16-17	1959	1959 Hengchun earthquake	Earthquake	Pingtung County	
16	1961	Typhoon Betty	Typhoon	Northern Taiwan	
16	1997	Formosa Airlines Flight 7601	Plane crash	Beigan Township, Fuchien Province	
16	1986	Daren Gong Shipbreaking Yard Explosion	Explosion	Kaohsiung	
16	1997	1997 Taoyuan bus crash	Bus accident	Taoyuan	
16	1990	Money Locker MTV Fire	Building fire	Kaohsiung	
16	1992	Mythical World KTV fire	Arson	Zhongshan District, Taipei	
16	2003	Luzhou Daxishi Community fire	Arson	Luzhou District, New Taipei	
15	1990	Wufu Commercial Building fire	Arson	Taoyuan	
15	1963	Typhoon Wendy	Typhoon	Northern Taiwan	
15	2014	2014 Dengue fever outbreak	Disease outbreak	Kaohsiung	
15	1981	Sage Falls flash flood	Flash flood	Shilin District, Taipei	
15	1906	1906 Yanshui earthquake	Earthquake	Tainan	
15	1982	Typhoon Andy	Typhoon	Southern Taiwan	
15	2012	Typhoon Saola	Typhoon	Northern and eastern Taiwan	
15	2024	Typhoon Gaemi	Typhoon	Northeast and southern Taiwan	
15	2015	2015 New Taipei water park fire	Dust fire	Bali District, New Taipei	
15	2018	Taipei Hospital fire	Building fire	Xinzhuang District, New Taipei	
14	1961	Typhoon June	Typhoon	Central Taiwan	
14	1963	Zhongshan Hall stampede	Crowd crush	Taoyuan	
14	1968	Typhoon Nadine	Typhoon	Northern Taiwan	
14	1970	China Airlines Flight 206	Plane crash	Songshan District, Taipei	
14	1988	Baling Industrial Road tour bus crash	Bus accident	Taoyuan	
14	2000	Typhoon Bilis	Typhoon	Central Taiwan	
13	1982	CSIC Esso Spain oil tanker fire	Ship fire	Kaohsiung	
13	1918	Yingge runaway train accident	Train accident	Yingge District, New Taipei	
13	1986	1986 Hualien earthquake	Earthquake	Hualien County	
13	1962	Typhoon Amy	Typhoon	Eastern and central Taiwan	
13	1939	Chiayi Girls' High School drowning	Drowning accident	Sihu Township, Yunlin County	
13	1986	Typhoon Abby	Typhoon	Northern and central Taiwan	
13	1986	China Airlines Flight 2265	Plane crash	Magong, Penghu County	
13	1998	Formosa Airlines Flight 7623	Plane crash	Offshore of Hsinchu County	
13	1972	Shulin Junior High School tour bus crash	Bus accident	Pinglin District, New Taipei	
13	1983	Kaifeng Street Section 2 fire	Building fire	Taipei	
13	1992	Tonight Karaoke Fire	Building fire	Hsinchu County	
13	1993	Yangmingshan tour bus accident	Bus accident	Yangmingshan, Taipei	
13	1984	Zhongshan Expressway pileup	Vehicle pileup	Miaoli County	
13	1936	Erjie Paper Factory explosion	Explosion	Wujie Township, Yilan County	
13	2012	Simakusi tour bus accident	Bus accident	Jianshi Township, Hsinchu County	
13	1994	Juxing Diamond KTV Fire	Building fire	Taipei	
13	1982	Futian coal mine explosion	Mine disaster	Neihu District, Taipei	
13	1995	Happy Song KTV fire	Arson	Taipei	
13	1996	Minsheng Building Fire	Building fire	Taichung	
13	2012	Xinying Hospital Beimen Branch Fire	Building fire	Tainan	
12	2005	Typhoon Haitang	Typhoon	Northern and eastern Taiwan	
12	1989	Yongxing Airlines C404 plane crash	Plane crash	Kaohsiung	
12	1888	Sinking of the Wei Ding	Maritime disaster	Paracel Islands (disputed)	
12	1959	Typhoon Freda	Typhoon	Eastern Taiwan	
12	1976	Typhoon Billie	Typhoon	Northern and eastern Taiwan	
12	2009	Typhoon Parma	Typhoon	most of Taiwan	
12	1990	Bade Township firecracker factory explosion	Explosion	Taoyuan	
12	1989	Cross-Island Highway tour bus crash	Bus accident	Taoyuan	
12	1971	1971 Taiwan Railways train collision	Train collision	Changhua County	
12	2015	Typhoon Soudelor	Typhoon	Northern and eastern Taiwan	
12	1991	Wangtian Interchange accident	Vehicle collision	Taichung	
12	1979	Wangang Fireworks Company explosion	Explosion	Taichung	
12	1998	1998 Taichung City residential fire	Building fire	Taichung	
11	1956	Xindong Plastic factory fire	Building fire	Taichung	
11	1969	Typhoon Viola	Typhoon	Southern Taiwan	
11	1881	1881 Taipei Earthquake	Earthquake	Miaoli County	
11	1981	Qingtong Coal Mine Explosion	Mine disaster	Pingxi District, New Taipei	
11	1927	1927 Xinying Earthquake	Earthquake	Tainan	
11	1957	1957 Hualien Earthquake	Earthquake	Hualien County	
11	1987	Typhoon Gerald	Typhoon	Southern Taiwan	
11	1984	Magong Ferry fire	Ship fire	Magong	
11	1989	1989 Hualien hotel fire	Building fire	Hualien City	
11	1993	1993 Pingzhen City fire	Building fire	Taoyuan	
11	1995	Carnival Building Fire	Building fire	Chiayi City	
11	1997	1997 Kaohsiung gas explosion	Explosion	Kaohsiung	
10	1961	Guanglong Oil Tanker explosion	Ship fire	Kaohsiung	
10	1976	Pacific Toy Factory Fire	Building fire	Taoyuan	
10	1882	1882 Taiwan Earthquake	Earthquake	Taitung County	
10	1993	Black Pearl Karaoke Fire	Building fire	Shulin District, New Taipei	
10	1981	1981 Hsinchu County level crossing accident	Level crossing accident	Hsinchu County	
10	1966	Typhoon Elsie	Typhoon	Northern and eastern Taiwan	
10	1996	Yongxing Resin Chemical Factory Explosion	Explosion	Taoyuan	
10	1970	1970 Hsinchu City level crossing accident	Level crossing accident	Hsinchu City	
10	2023	Pingtung Science and Technology Industrial Park Fire	Building fire	Pingtung City	

== See also ==
- List of earthquakes in Taiwan
