= 2019 Hualien earthquake =

Magnitude 6.1 earthquake in Taiwan

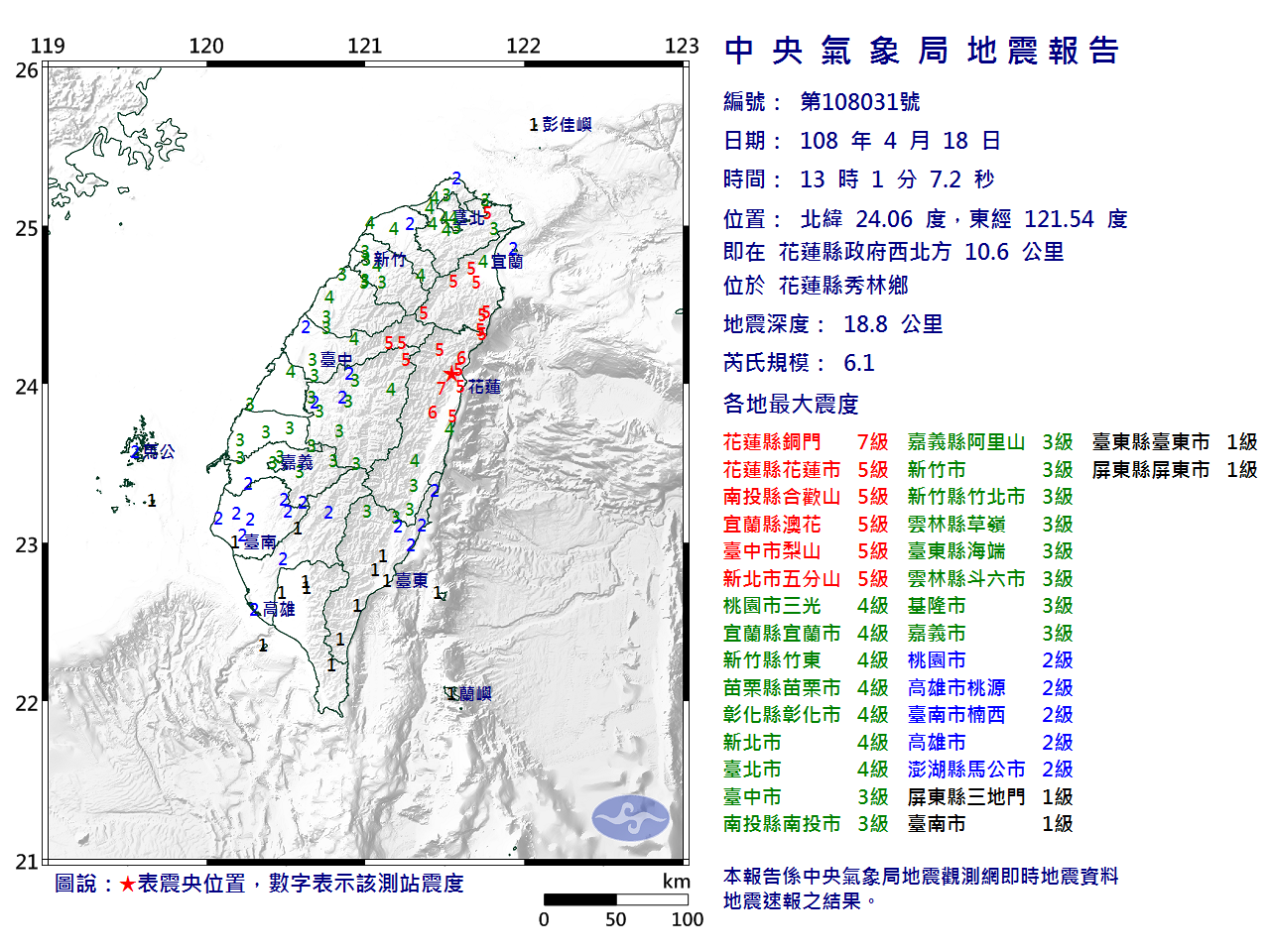

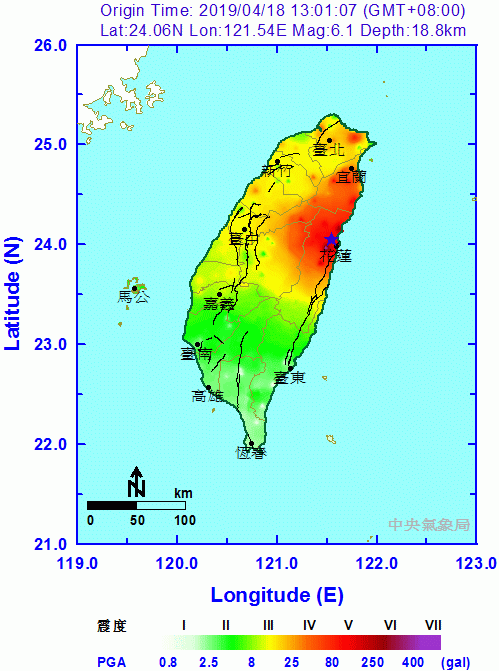

- Location within Taiwan
- UTC time: 2019-04-18 05:01:06
- ISC event: 615410465
- USGS-ANSS: ComCat
- Local date: 18 April 2019
- Local time: 13:01:06
- Magnitude: 6.1 M_{w}
- Depth: 18.8 kilometres (12 mi)
- Epicenter: 24.06°N 121.54°E
- Areas affected: Taiwan (Hualien County)
- Max. intensity: MMI VI (Strong)
- Casualties: 1 dead, 16 injured

The 2019 Hualien earthquake (Chinese: 418花蓮地震) struck Hualien County, Taiwan with a moment magnitude of 6.1 on 18 April at 13:01 local time (05:01 UTC).

== Geography ==
A 6.1 earthquake hit Taiwan which caused damage to weak buildings and roads in Taipei and other districts. Two people were injured while hiking and 15 other people were injured in Taipei. This was a moment magnitude earthquake 9 kilometres off of Hualien County, Taiwan. One of the two injured hikers which is identified as from Malaysia later died in local hospital on 28 April as the only fatality in the earthquake, which is the worst since 2018.

== Aftermath ==
Several buildings were damaged after the earthquake with many buildings having to be evacuated. Outside walls of buildings damaged and furniture knocked off the wall was not unprecedented. Train services on Taipei's subway were suspended as were the airport subway to Taoyuan International Airport and most other metro and train systems in various parts of Taiwan, especially those around eastern and northern Taiwan, for safety inspections. A building was also leaning on its side in Hualien City.

== See also ==
- List of earthquakes in 2019
- List of earthquakes in Taiwan
- 2018 Hualien earthquake
