= Uranus Building =

Demolished building in Hualien, Taiwan

Uranus Building 天王星大樓
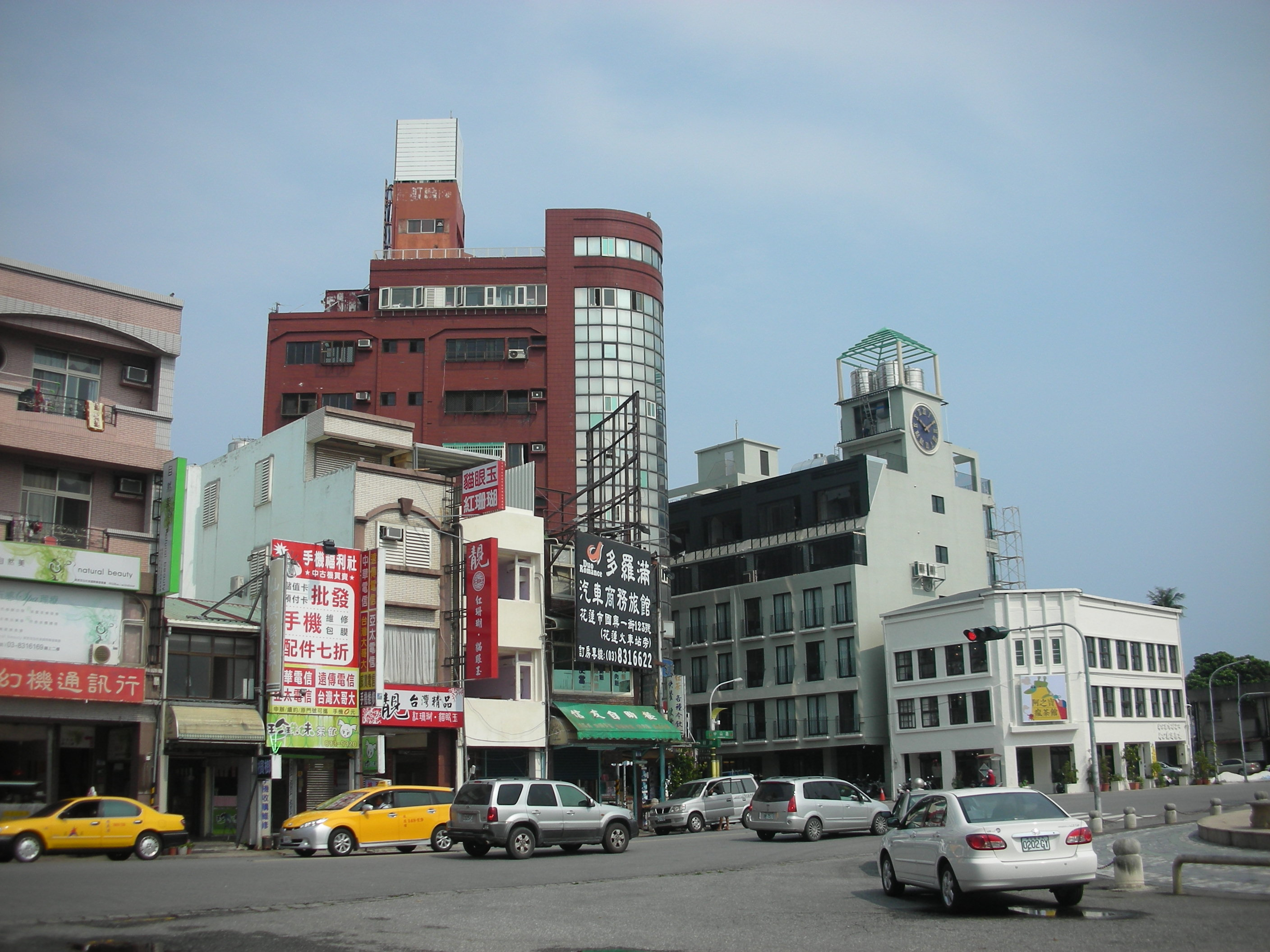
- Uranus building in March 2013

General information
- Type: Retail and residential
- Architectural style: Pacific Asian modernism
- Location: Xuanyuan Road, Hualien City, Hualien County, Taiwan
- Coordinates: 23°58′28″N 121°36′42″E
- Completed: 1986
- Closed: 3 April 2024

Technical details
- Floor count: 10

The Uranus Building (Chinese: 天王星大樓; pinyin: Tiānwángxīng dàlóu) was a ten-story tower building in Hualien City, Hualien County, Taiwan. The building was constructed in 1986 and housed shops and apartments.

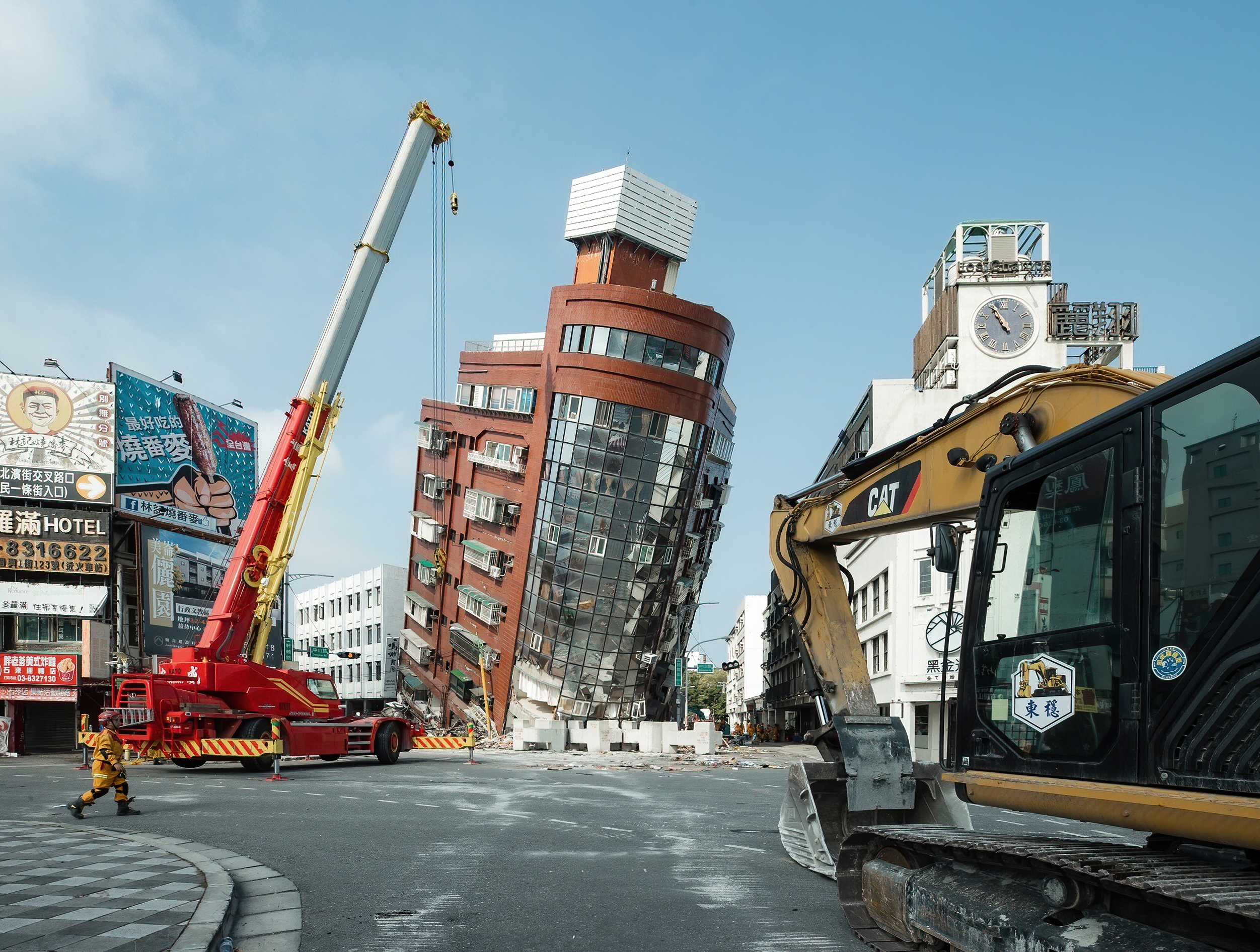
Rescue workers near the semi-collapsed ten-story Uranus Building on Xuanyuan Road after the 2024 Hualien earthquake

The tower had suffered damage during the 2018 Hualien earthquake, landing it on the "code yellow" list of non-structurally damaged buildings. The code was lifted after repairs. It then partially collapsed during the 2024 Hualien earthquake, which left the building dramatically tilted over at a 25-degree angle. Demolition began on the building two days after the quake and was completed after a two-week period. It was one of two tower buildings that were rendered structurally leaning due to the earthquake, next to other damaged buildings including the National Hualien Girls' Senior High School.

In December 2025, the owner of the construction firm, surnamed Chen, was indicted for charges of negligent homicide due to the collapse of the building.
