= Carlton Barber's Shop fire =

1993 mass murder in Taipei, Taiwan

- Location: Taipei, Taiwan
- Date: May 12, 1993
- Target: Carlton Barber's Shop
- Attack type: Arson, mass murder
- Deaths: 21 (including the perpetrator)
- Injuries: 7
- Perpetrator: Liang Hsin-teng

The Carlton Barber's Shop fire was an act of mass murder that killed twenty people and injured seven others in the Carlton Barber's Shop (Chinese: 卡爾登理容院), a massage parlor in Taipei, Taiwan on May 12, 1993. The perpetrator, 52-year-old Liang Hsin-teng (Chinese: 梁興登), had an argument with the shop's owner. He set himself on fire and the blaze spread to the other levels of the shop and killed most of the victims by asphyxiation.

== Arson ==
On May 12, 1993, Liang, who operated an illegal lottery, had an argument with the shop's owner about the payment of NT$700,000 in gambling debt. When the shop's owner refused to pay, Liang doused himself with gasoline and, shouting curses, set himself on fire in the basement of the establishment, which occupied three levels of a 12-storey building on Songjiang Road (松江路). The blaze quickly spread to the two other levels of the shop, asphyxiating most of the victims. The parlor had been repeatedly warned by police in the preceding months that it was violating safety regulations.
