= National Hualien Girls' Senior High School =

National Hualien Girls' Senior High School 國立花蓮女子高級中學
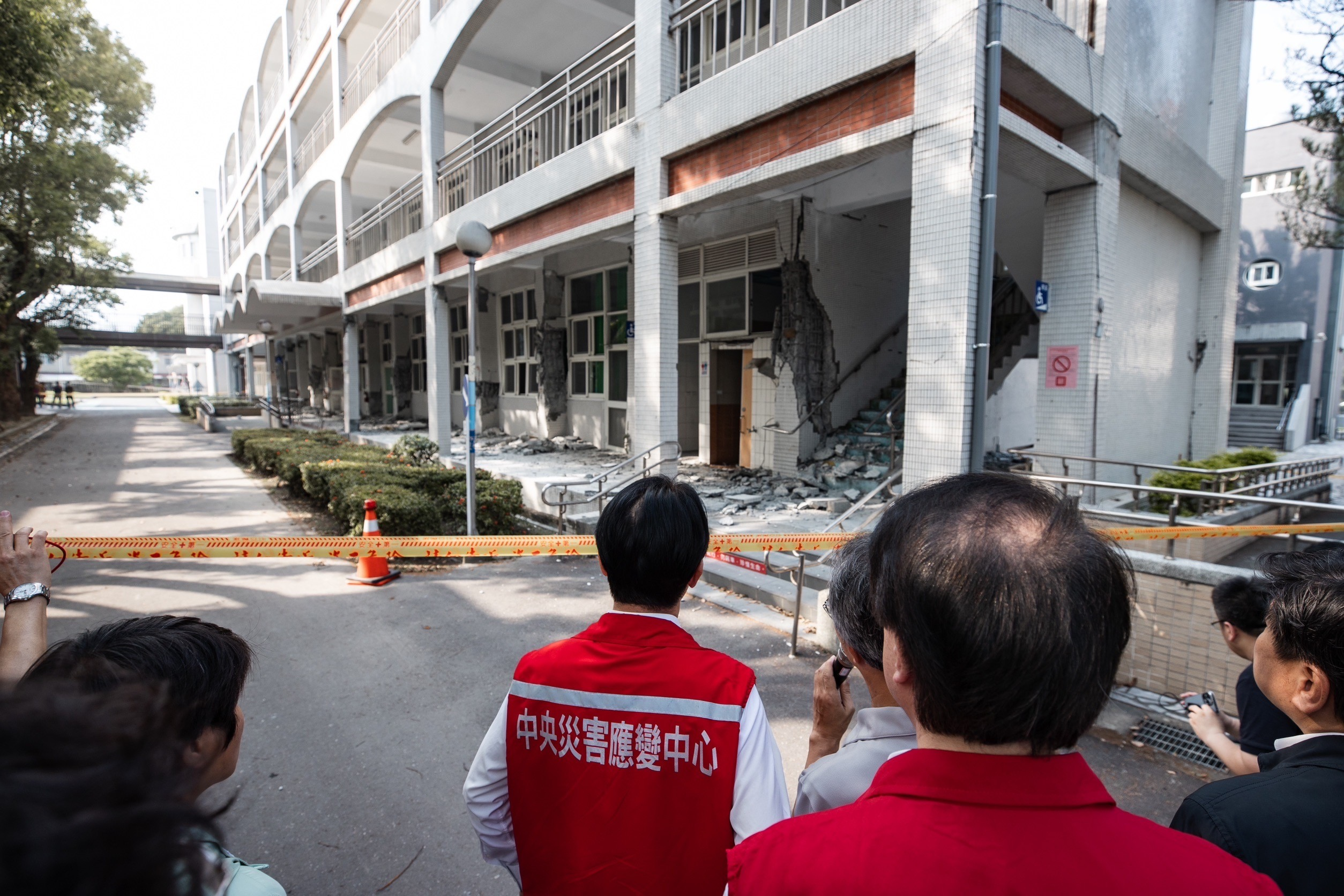
- Building after being damaged by the 2024 Hualien earthquake on April 3, 2024

Location
- No. 2, Jinghua Street, Hualien City; Hualien City, Hualien County, Taiwan; Taiwan
- Coordinates: 23.979395°N 121.615229°E

Information
- Type: State secondary, day
- Mottoes: Gentle, respectful, diligent and thrifty
- Established: 1927; 99 years ago by the Hualien Port Department
- Principal: Zhan Manfu

National Hualien Girls' Senior High School (NHGSHS, HLGS, Chinese: 國立花蓮女子高級中學), is an all-girls senior high school located in Hualien City, Hualien County, Taiwan, adjacent to Huagang Junior High School and North Bin Park Girls Senior High School in the Hualien area.

== History ==
It was established on 1 April 1927 (Showa 2), and was named " Hualien Port Hall Hualien Port High School for Girls". The students were mainly Japanese, with Taiwanese accounting for only one percent.

On 5 December 1945 (the 34th year of the Republic of China), Taiwan was liberated and was ordered to be renamed "Hualien Girls' School". The Hualien Port Office Takeover Committee sent Mr. Wang Cangming to take over. In January 1946, the Education Department of the Chief Executive's Office appointed Ms. Yu Xiaozhao as the first principal. In February, it was renamed "Taiwan Provincial Hualien Girls' High School". In 1968, the Republic of China extended the national education to nine years, and the junior high school ended year by year. In July 1970, the junior high school was closed and ordered to be renamed "Taiwan Provincial Hualien Girls' High School". In February 2000, in order to save money, it was restructured into "National Hualien Girls' Senior High School". In 2010, the school's old administrative teaching building was assessed to be dangerous and included in the demolition and reconstruction process. The new administrative building was completed in 2011.

In April 2010, it was rated as a quality high school by the Ministry of Education.

The institutional building structure was heavily damaged in the 2024 Hualien earthquake.

== See also ==
- National Hualien Senior High School
- Education in Taiwan
