= Weierkang Club fire =

1995 fire in Taichung, Taiwan

- Native name: 衛爾康餐廳大火
- Date: February 15, 1995
- Time: 7:20 PM NST
- Location: West District, Taichung; 24°08′55.1″N 120°40′21.8″E
- Type: Fire
- Cause: Natural gas leak
- Deaths: 64
- Injuries: 11

Weierkang Club
- Traditional Chinese: 衛爾康西餐廳
- Literal meaning: Weierkang Western Restaurant
Transcriptions
Standard Mandarin
- Hanyu Pinyin: Wèi'ěrkāng Xīcāntīng

On February 15, 1995, a deadly fire broke out in the Weierkang Club (Note: The Mandarin Chinese name of the establishment uses the word "restaurant".) (alternatively translated as the Welcome Bar), a Western-style restaurant and karaoke bar in West District, Taichung, Taiwan. The fire killed 64 people and injured 11, making it the second-deadliest fire in the history of Taiwan after the 1984 Meishan coal mine fire that killed 103.

== Background ==
The Weierkang Club was composed of a restaurant at No. 54 and 56, Section 2, Taizhonggang Road (now Taiwan Blvd) and a karaoke box at the adjacent No. 56 that was also owned by the restaurant. The restaurant was a three-story building: the first two floors were dining spaces, and the third was used as an office.

== Fire ==
At roughly 7:20 PM NST, a natural gas leak led to a fire on the first floor bar near the stairs to the second floor. The flames quickly engulfed the staircase and spread along the wooden furnishing.

The lack of fire safety measures in the restaurant significantly contributed to the death toll. The emergency exits located on the first and second floor were blocked off by bricks and corrugated metal, respectively. While there was another exit on the third floor that led to a parking garage, restaurant employees had left the building without notifying the customers of that exit, leading the remaining people to crowd towards the second-floor window. However, they were unable to break the tempered glass because they struck the middle of the pane instead of the corners. Emergency services responded quickly since the restaurant was near a fire station, but the illegally-constructed karaoke box beside the restaurant made it difficult for responders to reach the building and put out the fire. The fire took roughly two hours to be extinguished.

== Investigation and trial ==
Immediately after the fire, criticism was aimed at the government's careless attitude towards enforcing building codes and other safety standards. The Weierkang Club was only registered to operate on the first floor: the second and third floor, as well as the adjacent karaoke box, were all operating without a license. A writer for the Central Daily News also pointed to the lack of lateral communication between government agencies that allowed them to shift responsibilities among each other.

The manager of the Weierkang Club was ordered to pay NT$240 million as compensation to the families of the deceased, and then served four years in prison for negligent homicide. The Taichung City Government was also ordered to pay NT$640 million as compensation. Four government officials were impeached: Taichung City Mayor Lin Po-jung (put on probation for half a year), Taichung Department of Public Works Director Yang Ching-tang (楊慶堂), Taichung Construction Bureau Director Lai Pin-tsan (賴炳燦), and Taichung Police Department Commissioner Meng Yi-sun (孟宜蓀).

On July 12, 1995, the Legislative Yuan passed the first major overhaul to the Fire Services Act, which was first introduced in 1985.

== See also ==
- 2021 Kaohsiung tower fire
- List of building or structure fires
