= 2021 Kaohsiung building fire =

Disaster in southwestern Taiwan

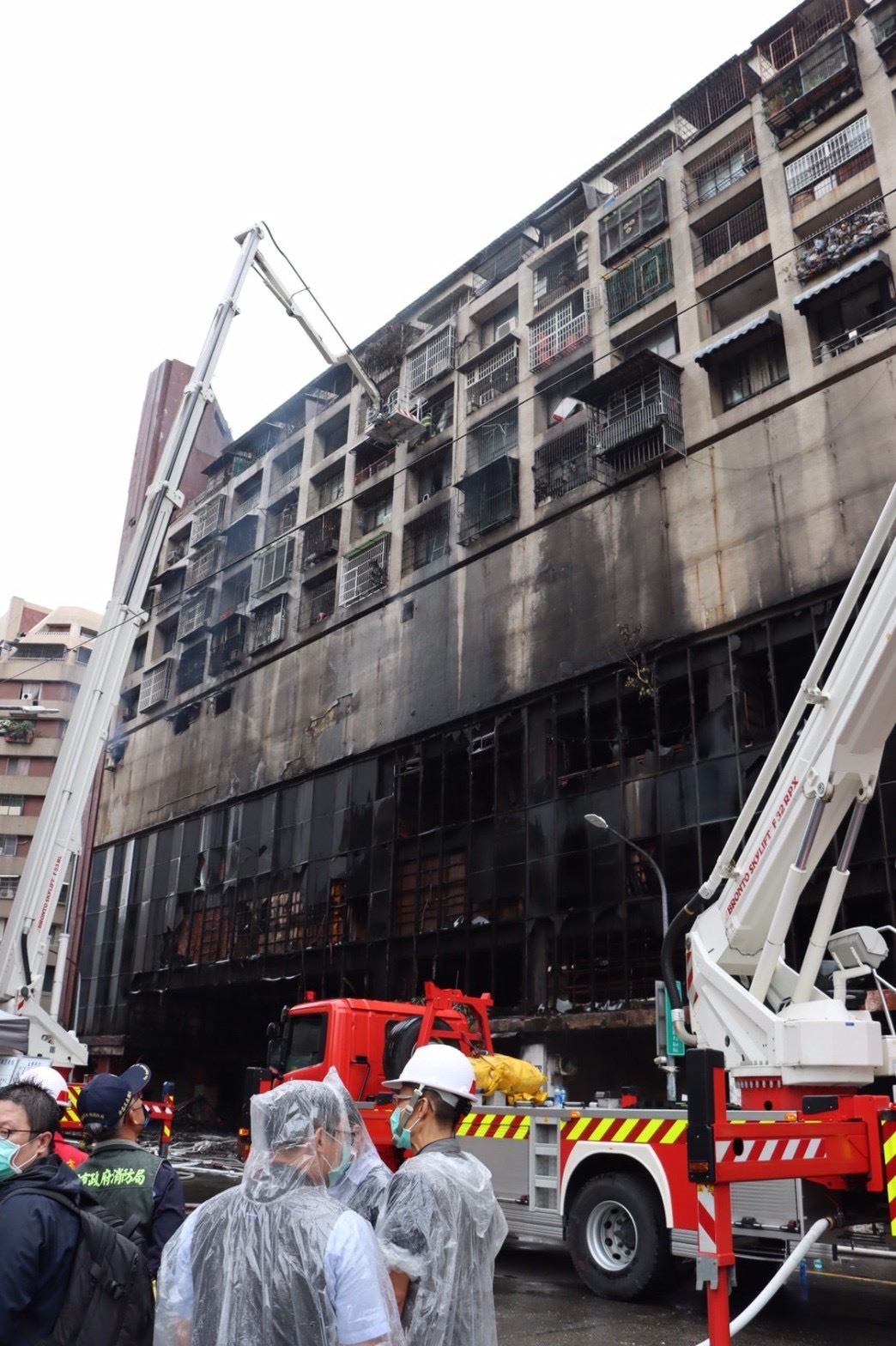
- Native name: 高雄城中城大樓大火
- Date: 14 October 2021
- Time: 02:54 NST (UTC+8)
- Location: Cheng Chung Cheng Building; No. 31, Fubei Road; Yancheng District; Kaohsiung, Taiwan; 22°37′43″N 120°17′07″E
- Type: Fire
- Motive: To embarrass her boyfriend
- Perpetrator: Huang Ke-ke
- Deaths: 46
- Injuries: 41

In the early morning hours of 14 October 2021, at 02:54 NST (UTC+8), a fire broke out in a 13-storey building at Fubei Road in Yancheng District, Kaohsiung, a city in southwestern Taiwan. At least 46 people were killed, and 41 others were injured. The fire was extinguished after about four and a half hours. The cause of the fire is under investigation, although piles of debris left around the building may have complicated rescue efforts and helped fuel the fire.

It was the deadliest fire in the city's history, and the deadliest building fire in Taiwan since 1995, when a karaoke bar in Taichung in central Taiwan caught fire, killing 64 people and overall the third-deadliest fire in the history of Taiwan.

== Background ==
The Cheng Chung Cheng Building (Chinese: 城中城大樓), built around 1981, is a 13-floor commercial and residential building, one of many apartment buildings in the Yancheng District, an older section of Kaohsiung. The mayor of Kaohsiung Chen Chi-mai stated that the building had previously housed a cinema, as well as restaurants and karaoke lounges, but was partially abandoned at the time of the fire, save for around 120 households. Officials also stated that the building was 40 years old, and that a few shops were located in the lower levels. Two underground floors were not being used, and the first to fifth floors were abandoned.

Usage of Chengzhongcheng Building
Floor	Originally	During the fire
12	Restaurant	Closed
7–11	Office	Divided flats
5–6	Movie theater	Abandoned
1–4	Shopping mall	Some shops on lower levels
B1	Car park	Abandoned
B2	Shopping mall & Cabaret	Abandoned

About 120 households lived between the seventh and eleventh floors. Fire chief Lee Ching-hsiu stated that most of the residents were elderly and either suffering from physical ailments or dementia. The apartments were as small as 13 m^{2} (140 sq ft), and many residents lived alone.

The tower had suffered another fire earlier in its lifetime, in 1999. This earlier fire had occurred during daylight hours, and firefighters were able to rescue 28 people that were trapped in the building, resulting in no deaths.

Locals called the tower "Kaohsiung's No. 1 ghost building". Fire extinguishers had only been installed the month prior, with only three per floor due to lack of funds. In 2007, Apple Daily reported that the abandoned theatre in the building had become a meeting spot for gay men to engage in sexual activities. Urban explorers visiting in 2014 wrote that several sewer pipes in the building's upper floor had burst and that the lower floors were occupied by squatters.

== Fire ==
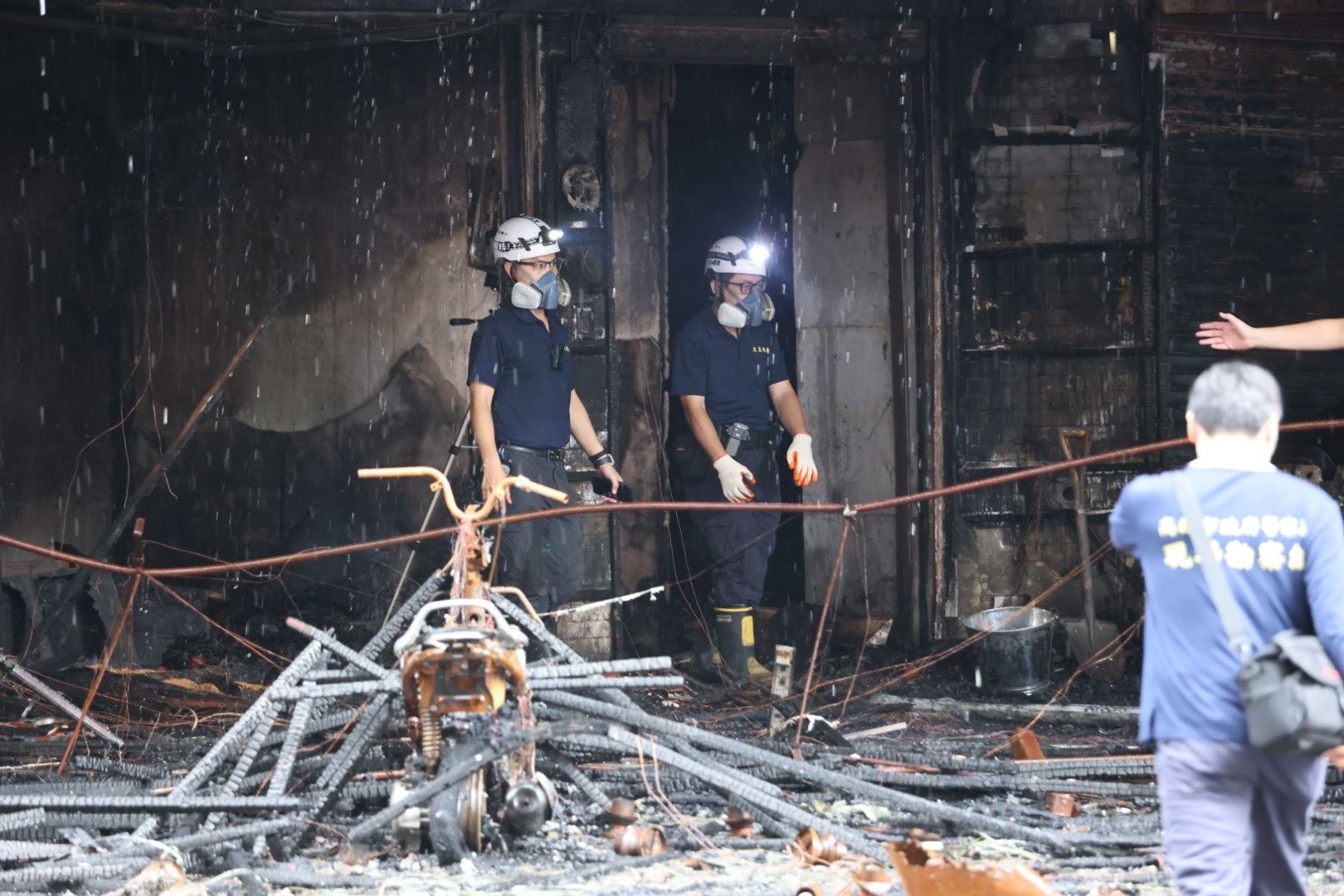
City firefighters at the building

The city's fire department stated that the fire was first reported at 02:54 NST (UTC+8). It is believed by authorities that the fire first broke out, reportedly at 02:45, at a tea-shop on the ground floor of the building. A survivor said she opened her door and saw black smoke everywhere, and other residents stated they heard a loud bang concurrent with that of an explosion before the fire was discovered.

Some 159 firefighters responded to the fire with 75 fire vehicles. Chief Lee stated that because the lower floors had high ceilings and a front made of glass, the fire rose up rapidly, eventually reaching up to the 6th floor, and filling the floors above with smoke. By midday at least 62 people had been evacuated from the building, aged between 8 and 83 years-old. Lee reported that the fire had been extinguished by 07:17 NST. More than 377 rescue workers were deployed to the scene and the rescue is ongoing.

While the cause of the fire was not reported immediately, the large amount of debris and clutter in the building reportedly helped spread the fire and added to its intensity. The debris and clutter also impeded the search and rescue and evacuation efforts as many points of access were blocked. Hours after the fire, smoke could still be seen, and the sound of glass breaking was heard around the building.

== Casualties ==
A total of 46 people died and a further 41 were injured. The fire bureau noted that the average age of the deceased was 62.

Initially, only seven people were reported dead by authorities, but the number grew throughout the night. Thirty-two people were declared deceased at the scene of the fire and sent directly to the morgue, while an additional 14 were sent to the hospital with no signs of life and declared dead there.

According to Chief Lee, the number of casualties was expected to rise, as some victims were still believed to be trapped between the 7th and 11th floors. Lee also noted that most of the casualties were caused by smoke inhalation and added that one reason why the casualty count was so high was because the fire happened during the early morning hours, while people were still asleep.

Three of the people who had died were Mainland Chinese citizens formerly married to Taiwanese nationals.

== Investigation ==
Authorities have also ordered an investigation to determine the cause of the fire, and have not ruled out the possibility of arson. The police have summoned four witnesses for the investigation. A man surnamed Kuo and a woman surnamed Huang were detained by the Kaohsiung District Prosecutors' Office. After questioning, Kuo was granted bail. The woman was named Huang Ke-ke and was revealed she was the one who set the fire. The motive was to embarrass her boyfriend whom she suspected of cheating. Initially facing the death penalty, she was instead charged with manslaughter, arson, and disenfranchisement for life and sentenced to life in prison.

== Aftermath ==
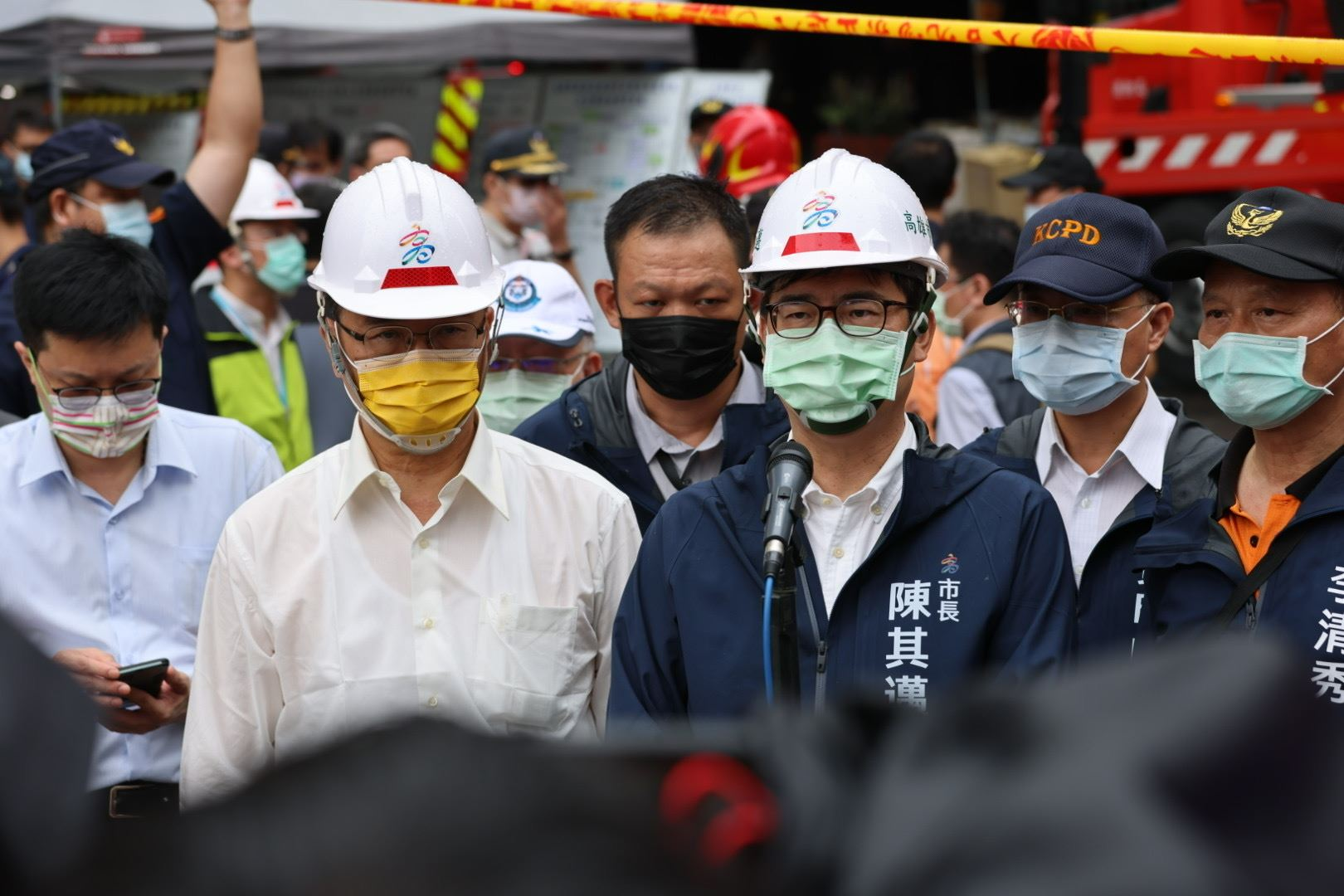
Ministry of the Interior Hsu Kuo-yung and Mayor Chen Chi-mai at the scene

President Tsai Ing-wen asked authorities to help relocate those affected. Kaohsiung city councilors called for fire safety to be improved throughout the city, including investigations of old buildings, amending safety standards, and equipment and infrastructure upgrades. Tsai visited the site of the fire on 16 October 2021, and pledged that her administration would improve fire safety and aid urban renewal.

Kaohsiung mayor Chen Chi-mai stated that the city government would pay medical fees for the injured, and aid the people that the fire forced to move. The Taipei City Government subsequently announced that new fire safety laws were to go into effect in January 2022, while members of the Taichung City Council pushed for a report to be made on the city's older structures, and Tainan mayor Huang Wei-cher ordered inspections of fifty buildings.

On 15 October 2021, a Taoist prayer was held at the site of the fire, and that day's Legislative Yuan session opened with a moment of silence.

Kaohsiung mayor Chen Chi-mai accepted the resignation of Fire Bureau chief Lee Ching-hsiu and Public Works Bureau Director-General Su Chih-hsun on 26 October 2021.

=== Demolition ===
In November 2021, a team of civil engineers and architects inspected the burnt-out building, and determined it was no longer structurally sound, and its interior conditions were a threat to public safety. They recommended that the building be demolished. The city government proposed replacing the demolished building with a public park and memorial. The building had a complex ownership structure, with property rights divided amongst hundreds of shareholders, a few of whom initially opposed the demolition. But the city government bought out their shares at above-market rates, allowing demolition to proceed on 17 December 2021. Former residents had been given notice that all recoverable belongings must be moved out of the building before then.

As of February 2022, the roof deck and 12th floor (formerly an abandoned restaurant) have been demolished. The demolition was briefly suspended after nearby residents complained about excessive noise and air pollution.

As of May 2022, demolition is almost complete, and the site is expected to be cleared of all debris by end of month. The park is scheduled to be constructed by September 2022.

As of November 2023, a fully functional park, complete with children's recreation area exists on site.

== See also ==
- 2015 Baku residence building fire
- Grenfell Tower fire
- FR Tower fire
- List of building or structure fires
