= 2018 Hualien earthquake =

Magnitude 6.4 earthquake in Taiwan

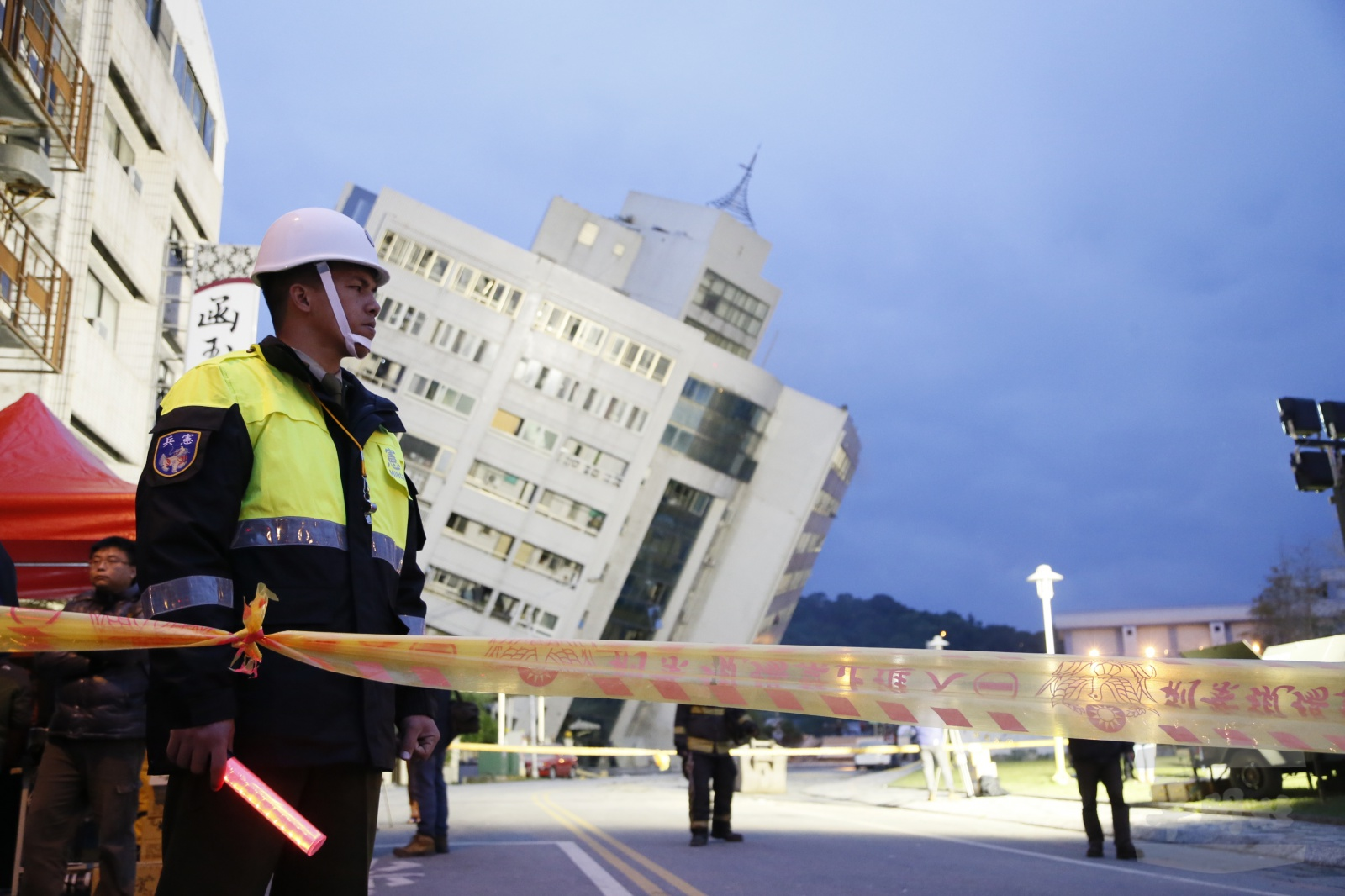
- The Yun Men Tsui Ti building, severely tilted after the quake

- 2018 Hualien earthquake (Taiwan)
- UTC time: 2018-02-06 15:50:43
- ISC event: 616640792
- USGS-ANSS: ComCat
- Local date: 6 February 2018
- Local time: 23:50:42 local time
- Magnitude: 6.4 M_{ww}
- Depth: 10.6 kilometres (7 mi)
- Epicenter: 24.132°N 121.659°E
- Type: Oblique-slip
- Areas affected: Hualien County, Taiwan
- Max. intensity: CWA 7 (MMI VIII)
- Peak acceleration: 482.36 gal (0.42 g)
- Peak velocity: 32.04 cm/s
- Foreshocks: yes
- Casualties: 17 dead, 285 injured

At 23:50 (UTC+8) on 6 February 2018, an earthquake of magnitude 6.4 on the moment magnitude scale hit Taiwan. The epicenter was on the coastline near Hualien, which was the most severely affected area, with a maximum felt intensity of 7 on the Central Weather Administration seismic intensity scale. At least 17 deaths were reported, with 285 injured. The maximum foreshock was recorded on 4 February 2018, at 21:56:40. The epicenter was located at Hualien County, Taiwan, reaching a scale of M_{L} 5.8.

== Tectonic setting ==
Taiwan has a history of many strong earthquakes. The island is located within a complex zone of convergence between the Philippine Sea plate and Eurasian plate. At the location of the earthquake, these plates converge at a rate of 75 mm per year. To the south of Taiwan, oceanic crust of the Eurasian plate is subducting beneath the Philippine Sea plate creating an island arc, the Luzon Arc. At Taiwan the oceanic crust has all been subducted and the arc is colliding with continental crust of the Eurasian plate. To the north of Taiwan the Philippine Sea plate is in contrast subducting beneath the Eurasian plate, forming the Ryukyu arc.

== Earthquake ==
The earthquake formed the largest of a sequence of events that have affected the area over a period of days, with 11 foreshocks of M 4.6 and greater, starting on 3 February with an M 4.8 earthquake and including an M 6.1 event on 4 February, within a few kilometres of the event that took place on 6 February. 6 February earthquake was a result of oblique-slip faulting. The earthquake occurred exactly two years after the 2016 Tainan earthquake. On the Central Weather Administration seismic intensity scale, the earthquake registered a maximum intensity of 7, which was recorded at Shoufeng Township in Hualien and Nan'ao Township in Yilan County.

The earthquake was followed by a series of aftershocks, with the largest being an M 5.7 event on 7 February at 23:21 local time, 19 km northeast of Hualien city, which reached a maximum intensity of VI (strong).

Richter magnitudes of the 2018 Hualian earthquakes. Source: Taiwan Central Weather Bureau

Map of 2018 Hualian earthquakes as of 9 February (UTC+8) plotting 359 shocks. Source: Taiwan Central Weather Bureau

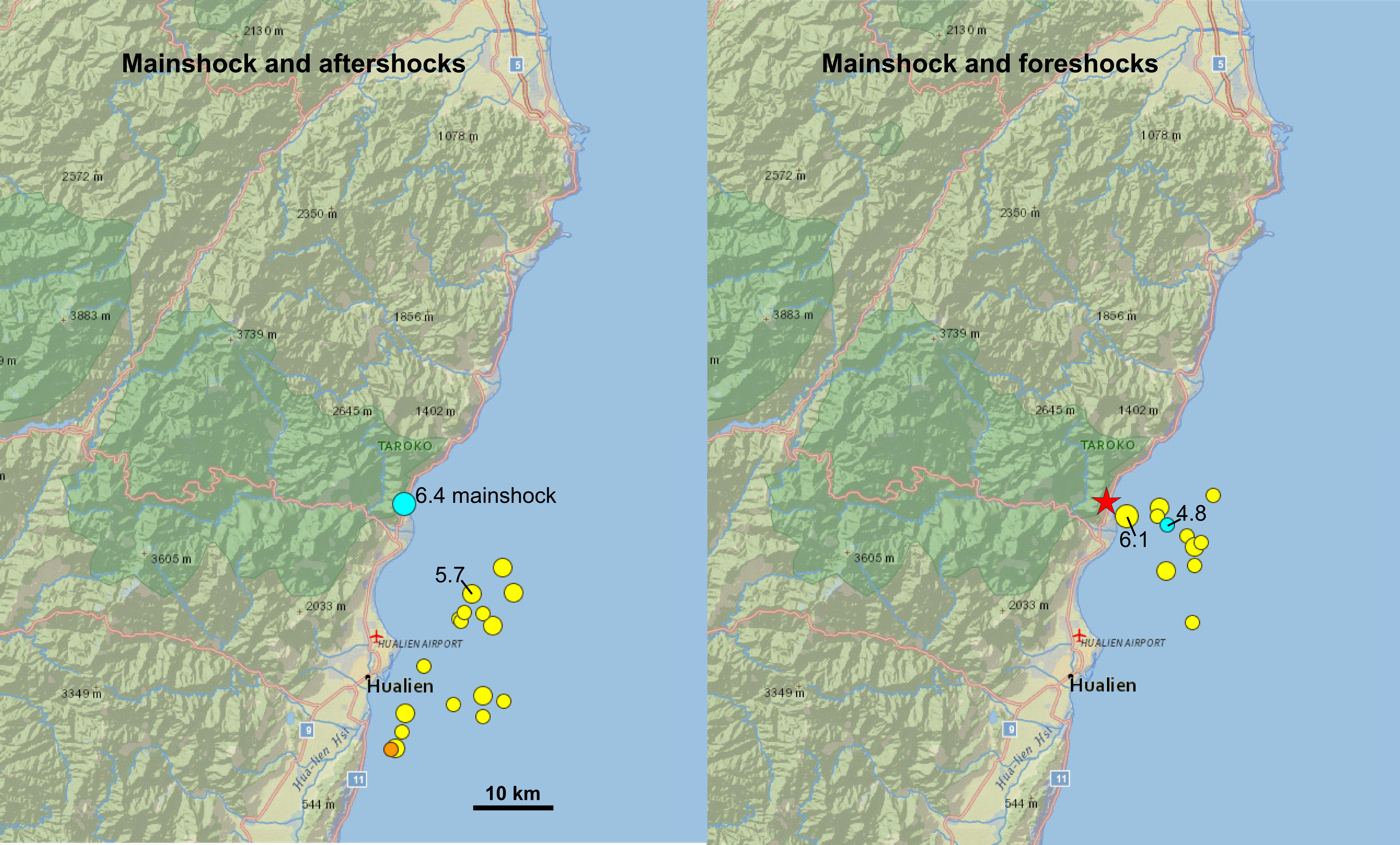
Maps of 2018 Hualian fore-, main, and aftershocks: on the right, the location of M>4.5 foreshocks and the mainshock (red star); on the left, M>4.5 aftershocks (as of 18:00 UTC 9 February) and the mainshock. Both maps are from USGS earthquake catalog results.

== Aftermath ==
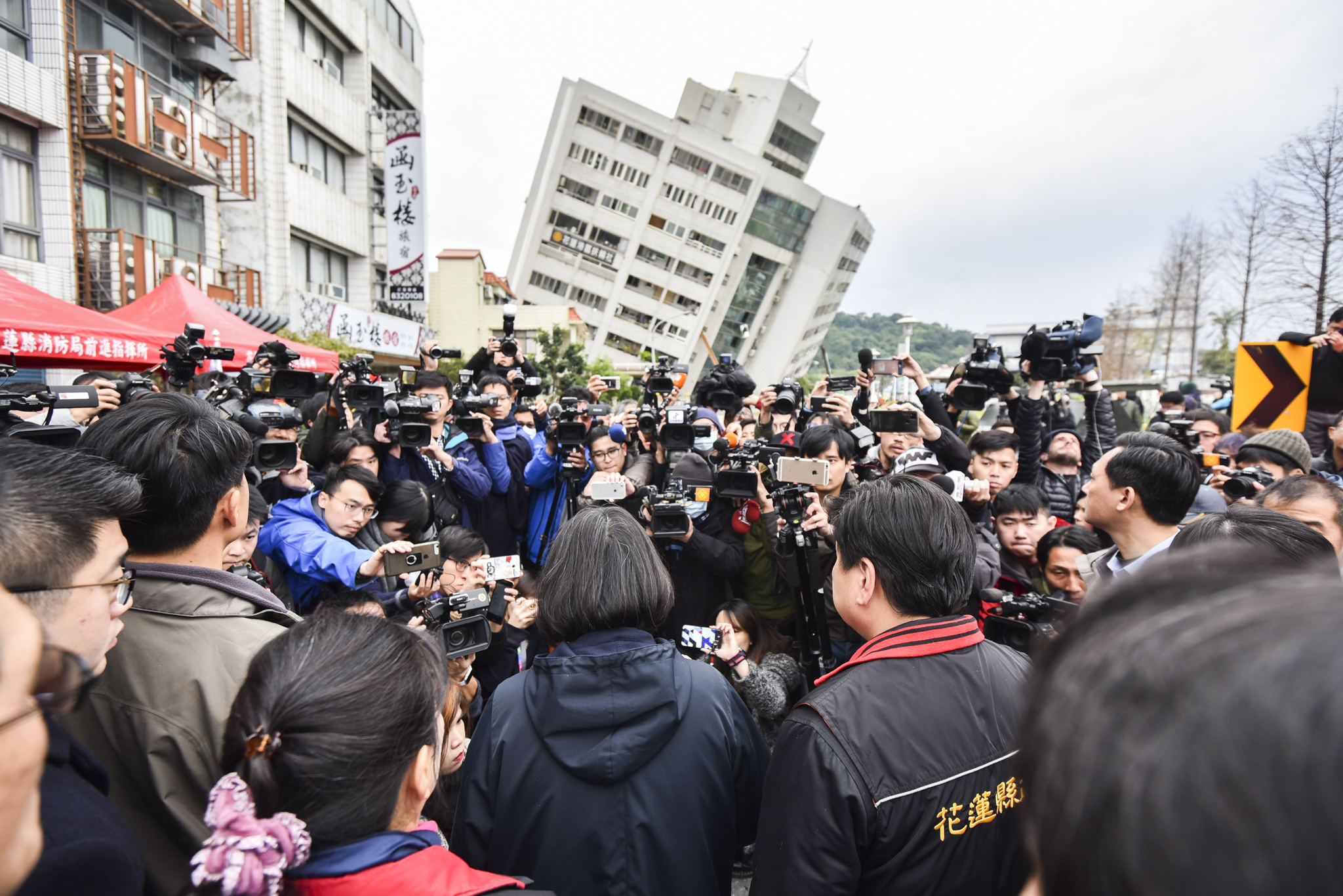
President Tsai Ing-wen (center) inspects a collapsed building and addresses the press in Hualien City.

=== Casualties ===
Seventeen people were killed during the quake, and a further 285 were injured. Of the fatalities, nine were from mainland China, five from Taiwan, two Canadians, and one from the Philippines. Fourteen of the victims were in The Yun Men Tsui Ti building.

=== Damage ===
Many buildings in the city of Hualien were damaged, including four that had partially collapsed or were severely damaged. The lower floors of the Marshal Hotel collapsed, killing two people. 14 deaths were also reported from the twelve-story Yun Men Tsui Ti (雲門翠堤) residential building, which was severely tilted due to the collapse of some of the lower floors. Large beams were placed by cranes on one side of the building in an effort to prevent further tilting during the continuing rescue efforts. The Uranus building was also damaged and later repaired.

Many homes were left without water. Bridges and highways remaining closed due to damage from the earthquake.

Hundreds of firefighters and military personnel stayed onsite to support efforts to rescue people trapped in damaged buildings.

=== International response ===
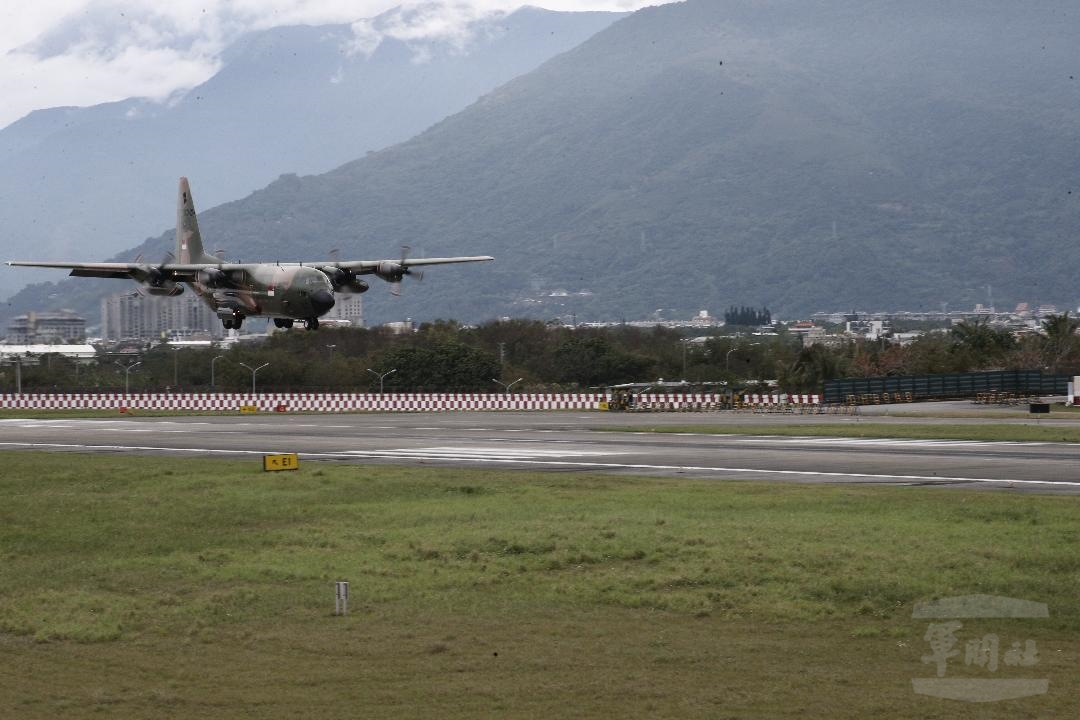
Humanitarian aid sent by a C-130 Hercules of the Republic of Singapore Air Force (RSAF) to Hualien Airport after the earthquake.

The Taiwanese government said that after several countries offered aid, including $3 million from the People's Republic of China, it had to "politely decline" them because Taiwan had no shortage of workers and supplies but accepted a Japanese contingent for their body-heat detection equipment, which Taiwanese authorities did not possess. Seven members of the first international search and rescue team from Japan arrived on 9 February. Singapore also flew in US$103,000 worth of humanitarian supplies to Taiwan through a C-130 Hercules of the Republic of Singapore Air Force.

At least 63 countries, 18 of which have formal diplomatic ties with Taiwan, as well as the European Union, the Organization of Eastern Caribbean States, the Central American Parliament and the Central American Integration System sent condolences to the Taiwanese government.

== See also ==
- 2024 Hualien earthquake
- List of earthquakes in 2018
- List of earthquakes in Taiwan
