= Central Weather Administration seismic intensity scale =

Earthquake intensity scale

The Central Weather Administration seismic intensity scale (Chinese: 交通部中央氣象署地震震度分級, CWASIS) is a seismic intensity scale used in Taiwan. It was established by the Central Weather Administration.

== Scale overview ==
Seismic Intensity Scale
Intensity Level (震度分級)			Strong Ground Acceleration (cm/s^{2},gal)	Ground Speed (cm/s)	What People Feel	Effects Indoors	Effects Outdoors
0		Undetectable (無感)	below 0.8 gal		Imperceptible to humans		
1		Slight (微震)	0.8-2.5 gal		People may feel slight shaking when motionless		
2		Weak (輕震)	2.5-8.0 gal		Most people will feel shaking, and some sleepers may wake up	Light shaking of dangling objects such as lamps	Stationary vehicles shake slightly, similar to when a truck passes by, but only for a short time
3		Light (弱震)	8.0-25 gal		Almost everyone will feel shaking, and some may experience fear	Houses shake; bowls, plates, doors, windows etc. make noise; dangling objects swing	Stationary vehicles shake visibly; power lines sway slightly
4		Moderate (中震)	25-80 gal	less than 15 cm/s	Will cause a considerable degree of fear; some people will look for shelter, and almost all sleepers will wake up	Houses shake violently; objects tumble; heavy furniture moves; slight damage may occur	Vehicle drivers feel slight shaking; power lines sway visibly; pedestrians also feel shaking
5	5 Lower	Strong (強震)	80 gal and above	15–30 cm/s	Most people are frightened and panic	Some walls crack; heavy furniture may be overturned	Vehicle drivers feel obvious shaking; some signboards and chimneys fall or collapse
5	5 Upper	Strong (強震)	80 gal and above	30–50 cm/s	Almost everyone is frightened and panics, and has difficulty walking	Large quantities of unsecured items tumble and fall; furniture moves or is overturned; some doors and windows become twisted; some walls crack; a small number of houses with poor seismic resistance may be damaged or collapse	Wall tiles fall from some buildings; rockfalls occur in mountainous areas; liquefaction may occur in soft soil; utilities and/or communications may be interrupted in some areas; a small number of brick walls with poor seismic resistance may be damaged or collapse
6	6 Lower	Violent (烈震)	80 gal and above	50–80 cm/s	Violent shaking makes it difficult to remain standing	Some buildings are damaged; heavy furniture is overturned; doors and windows twist	Drivers have difficulty driving; soil liquefaction is seen
6	6 Upper	Violent (烈震)	80 gal and above	80–140 cm/s	Violent shaking makes it almost impossible to stand	Lots of furniture moves violently or is overturned; doors and windows become twisted; some houses with poor seismic resistance may be damaged or collapse, and even houses with better seismic resistance may also be damaged	Some ground surfaces crack; landslides may occur in mountainous areas; liquefaction occurs in soft soil; utilities and/or communications may be interrupted on a large scale
7		Extreme (劇震)	80 gal and above	140 cm/s and above	Violent shaking make voluntary action impossible	Some buildings are seriously damaged or collapse; almost all furniture moves a long distance or tumbles	Landslides occur and fissures appear; railroad tracks are twisted; underground pipelines are damaged
