= 1986 Hualien earthquake =

Coordinates: 23.974°N 121.603°E

- Location within Taiwan
- UTC time: 1986-11-14 21:20:10
- ISC event: 480637
- USGS-ANSS: ComCat
- Local date: November 15, 1986
- Local time: 05:20:10
- Duration: 10.5
- Magnitude: M_{w} 7.4
- Depth: 33.8 km (21.0 mi)
- Casualties: 15 fatalities, 44 injuries

The 1986 Hualien earthquake occurred on November 15, 1986, when a strong earthquake with a recorded magnitude of 7.4 struck Hualien City in Taiwan. The earthquake killed 15 people and injured 44. Landslides occurred along a highway between Su'ao and Hualien. The Taiwan–Guam and Taiwan–Okinawa undersea telecommunication cables were damaged. The earthquake triggered a tsunami with a maximum height of 0.3 m (1 ft 0 in). The tsunami sank 10 fishing boats in Hualien and Yilan and was linked to six injuries.

== Aftershocks ==
The earthquake was preceded by a M_{L} 6.5 foreshock on May 20, 1986 which struck north of Hualien at 15.8 km (9.8 mi) depth. The foreshock produced aftershocks located on two parallel, steep, east-dipping thrust faults. Aftershocks were distributed northwest of the mainshock and had depths shallower than 16 km (9.9 mi), suggesting the earthquake ruptured unilaterally, northwest, and upward. The November 15, 1986 earthquake produced aftershocks largely concentrated at depths 15 km (9.3 mi) or shallower in the upper crust. Aftershocks extended 37 km (23 mi) deep.
