= Lianhua =

Lianhua may refer to:

- Lianhua County (莲花县), in Jiangxi, China
- Lianhua Dam, in Heilongjiang, China
- Lianhua Film Company (联华影业公司), a major Chinese film studio and production house in 1930s Shanghai
- Lianhua Peak (莲花山), the highest point in China's Anhui province, located in the Huangshan mountains
- Lianhua Supermarket
- Lianhua Town (disambiguation) (莲花镇), the name of a number of towns in China
- Lianhua, Wenquan, Yingshan County, Huanggang, Hubei

== See also ==
- Lianhua station (disambiguation)
- Lianhua Road station (莲花路站), station on Shanghai Metro Line 1, China
- Lian (disambiguation)
- Hua (disambiguation)
- Hualian (disambiguation)
- Linfa
