= Yeonhwasan =

Yeonhwasan may refer to:

- Yeonhwasan (Ulsan), mountain in Ulju County, Ulsan, South Korea
- Yeonhwasan (South Gyeongsang), mountain in Goseong County, South Gyeongsang, South Korea

== See also ==
- Lianhuashan (disambiguation)
