= Hualien =

Hualien, Hualian, Hua-lien, Hua-lian, may refer to:

== Places ==
=== Taiwan ===
- Hualien County (Chinese: 花蓮 "lily"), Taiwan
  - Hualien County Constituency
  - Hualien railway station
  - Hualien Airport
  - Hualian AFB
- Hualien City, a port city and the seat of Hualien County, Taiwan
  - Port of Hualien
  - Hualien Stadium
- Hualian River (花蓮溪) or Hualien River, a small river in Taiwan
- Roman Catholic Diocese of Hualien, Taiwan

=== Mainland China ===
- Hualian station, Suzhou Industrial Park, Suzhou, Jiangsu, China; a metro station
- Hualian, Xitang, Jiashan, Zhejiang, China; a village
- Hualian, Songyuan, Guangdong, China; a village

=== Malaysia ===
- Hua Lian, Tupai, Pokok Assam (state constituency), Perak, Malaysia; a neighbourhood
- Hua Lian School, Taiping, Perak, Malaysia; see List of Chinese national-type primary schools in Perak

=== Other locations ===
- 246504 Hualien, the asteroid Hualien, an asteroid in the Asteroid Belt, the 246,504th asteroid registered

== People and characters ==
- Boon Hua Lien (conductor), 2019 The American Prize orchestral winner

=== Characters ===
- Jing (Chinese opera), a major role type in Chinese opera, also known as Hualian
- Chou role, the clown role type in Chinese opera, also known as Xiao Hualian

== Groups, companies, and organizations ==
- Hualien County Government, Hualien County, Taiwan
  - Hualien County Council
- Beijing Hualian Group (Chinese: 华联 Huālián "China Union"), Beijing-based Chinese supermarket chain, also called Hualian
  - Hualian Supermarket, a subsidiary of Shanghai-based Lianhua Supermarket, part of the Bailian Group
- Hualien Media International, Taipei-based Taiwanese entertainment company
- Hua Lien International (Hong Kong stock ticker 969), see List of companies listed on the Hong Kong Stock Exchange

== Other uses ==
- Hualien earthquake (set index), any of several earthquakes; including Hualian
- Hualian virus, a strain of Ageratum yellow vein virus; a Begomovirus

== See also ==
- Hua (disambiguation)
- Lien (disambiguation)
- Lianhua (disambiguation)
