= Lianhua station =

Lianhua station may refer to:

- Lianhua station (Chengdu Metro), a metro station on Line 8 (Chengdu Metro)
- Lianhua station (Chongqing Rail Transit), a metro station on Line 3 (Chongqing Rail Transit)
- Lianhua station (Fuzhou Metro), a metro station on Line 6 (Fuzhou Metro), currently a unopened station on the operational Phase 1 of Line 6
- Lianhua station (Guangzhou Metro), a metro station under planning on Line 8 (Guangzhou Metro)

== See also ==
- Lianhua (disambiguation)
- Lianhuaqiao station in Beijing
- Lianhua Road station in Shanghai
