= Hua =

Hua or HUA may refer to:

== China ==
- Hua, as in Huaxia and Zhonghua, a name of China
  - Hoa people, Chinese people in Vietnam
- Hua (state), a state in ancient China, destroyed by Qin
- Hua (surname), a Chinese surname
- Hua County, in Anyang, Henan, China
- Hua County, Guangdong, now Huadu District, in Guangzhou, Guangdong, China
- Hua County, Shaanxi, now Huazhou District, in Weinan, Shaanxi, China
- Mount Hua, a mountain in Shaanxi, China

== Other uses ==
- Hua Islet, Wangan Township, Penghu County (the Pescadores), Taiwan (Republic of China)
- Hua language (disambiguation), a name used for several unrelated languages
- Hua's lemma, in analytic number theory
- Harkat-ul-Ansar (HuA), a Pakistan-based Islamist militant group
- Heard Understood Acknowledged (HUA), possible origin of hooah, a U.S. Army battle cry
- Redstone Army Airfield in Alabama, U.S.
- Turbonilla hua, a species of sea snail in the family Pyramidellidae
- Hua (gastropod), a genus of freshwater snails in the family Semisulcospiridae
- "Hua", a 2026 Indian Hindi-language song by Jubin Nautiyal

== See also ==
- An hua, in Chinese ceramics, a term meaning "secret decoration"
