= Lian =

Lian may refer to:

== Fiction ==
- Gao Lian (Water Margin), a character in the Water Margin series of novels
- Lian the Great (大廉, Dalian), a figure in Chinese mythology
- Jia Lian, a character in the novel Dream of the Red Chamber

== People ==
- Lian (given name), a list of people with this given name
- Lian (surname) (連 and 廉), Chinese surname

== Places ==
- Lian, Batangas, a municipality in the province of Batangas in the Philippines
- Lian, Iran, a village in Isfahan Province, Iran
- Lian, Norway, a recreational area located in the border between Bymarka and Byåsen in Trondheim, Norway
  - Lian tram stop, terminus of the Gråkallbanen
- Lian Island, the largest island in Lianyungang, Jiangsu, China

== Other ==
- Lian Ensemble, a Persian classical music ensemble

== See also ==
- Chuu-Lian, a Taiwanese-American mathematician
- Kim-Lian (born 1980), Dutch musical actress, presenter and a singer-songwriter
