= Bailian Group =

Chinese retail conglomerate

Bailian Group is a Chinese holding company formed in 2003 by the former Shanghai 100 (Group) Co., Ltd., Hualian (Group) Co., Ltd., Shanghai Friendship (Group) Co., Ltd., and Shanghai Materials (Group) Head Office. With more than 90,000 employees and more than 170,000 employees, the group is the largest commercial retail group in China.

== Structure ==
The group includes five listed companies:

- Bailian Co., Ltd. (Shanghai Stock Exchange: 600827)
- Lianhua Supermarket (Hong Kong Stock Exchange: 0980)
- Wumao Co., Ltd.
- Friendship Co., Ltd.
- First Pharmaceutical Co., Ltd.
- Yong'an Department Store, which was renamed from the original Shanghai Hualian Commercial Building.

The business scope includes department stores, standard supermarkets, hypermarkets, convenience stores, shopping malls, brand discount stores, professional specialty stores, e-commerce and logistics, etc. The main brands includes: First Department Store, Yong'an Department Store, Oriental Commercial Building, First Eight Hundred Ban, Bailian South, Western Suburbs, Central, Youyi City and other shopping malls, Bailian E City Network. Shopping mall; Bailian Outlets brand discount stores and Kesongfang, Haomeijia, Hualian Jimaisheng, Wu Liangcai and Maochang glasses, etc.

There are nearly 6,000 business outlets in 25 provinces and cities across the country. Bailian Group ranked second among the top 100 Chinese chains in 2012.

Ranked 84th among the top 500 Chinese enterprises, it also ranked 466th among the Fortune 500, with an operating income of $25.2 billion.

== Gallery ==
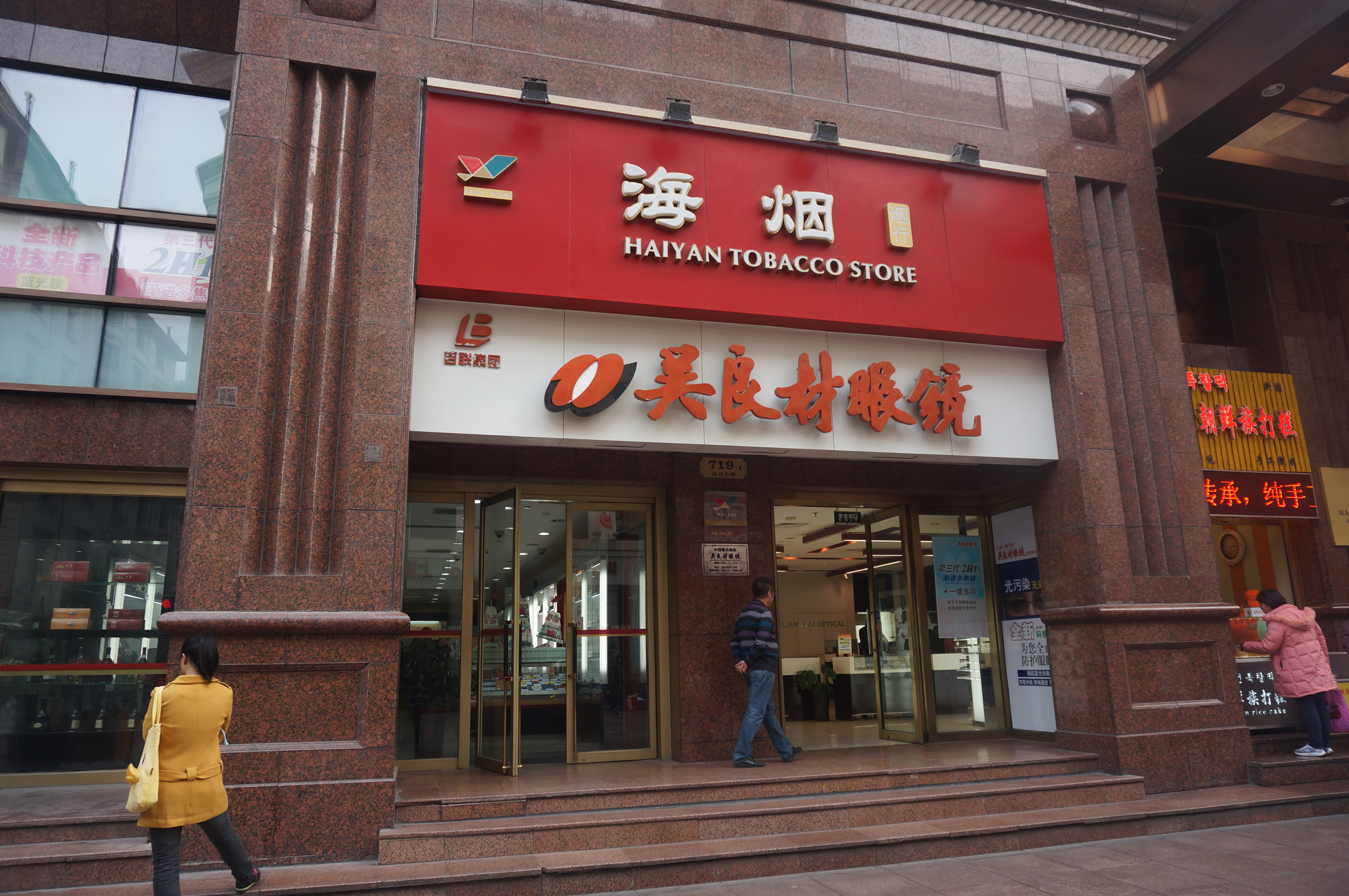
Wu Liangcai Glasses Store on Nanjing East Road, Shanghai

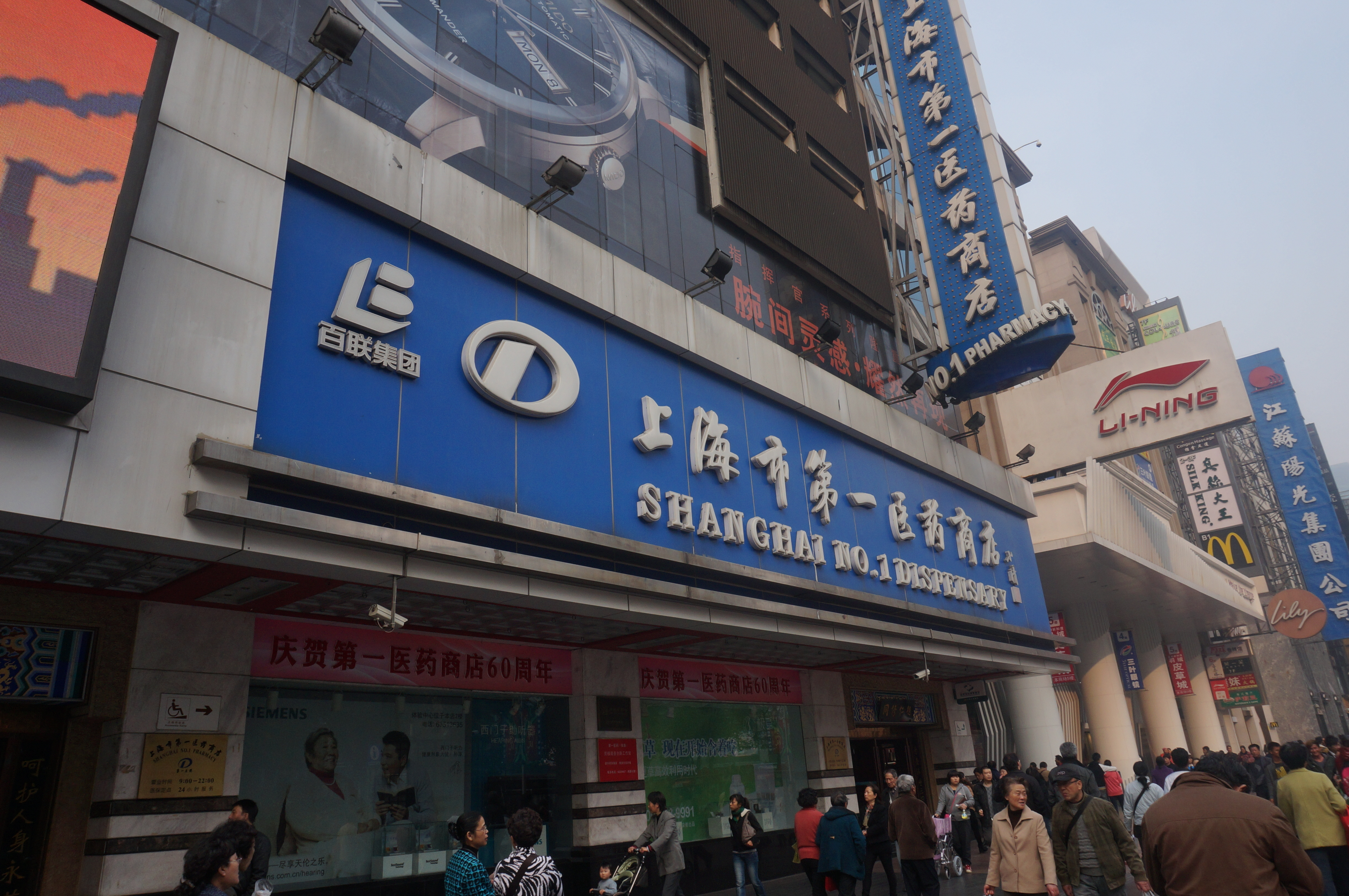
Shanghai No.1 Pharmaceutical Store on Nanjing East Road, Shanghai

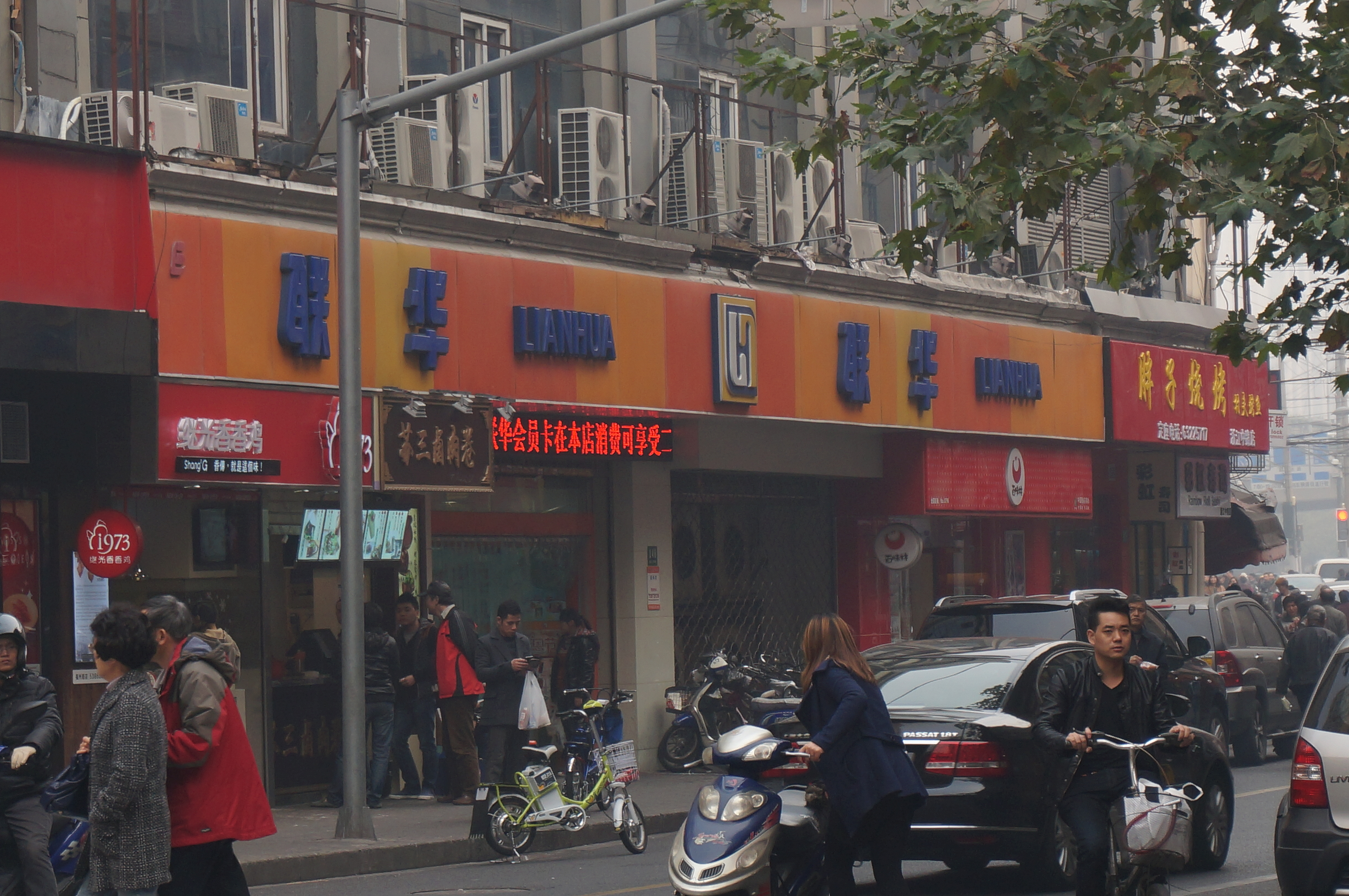
A Lianhua supermarket store in Huangpu District, Shanghai

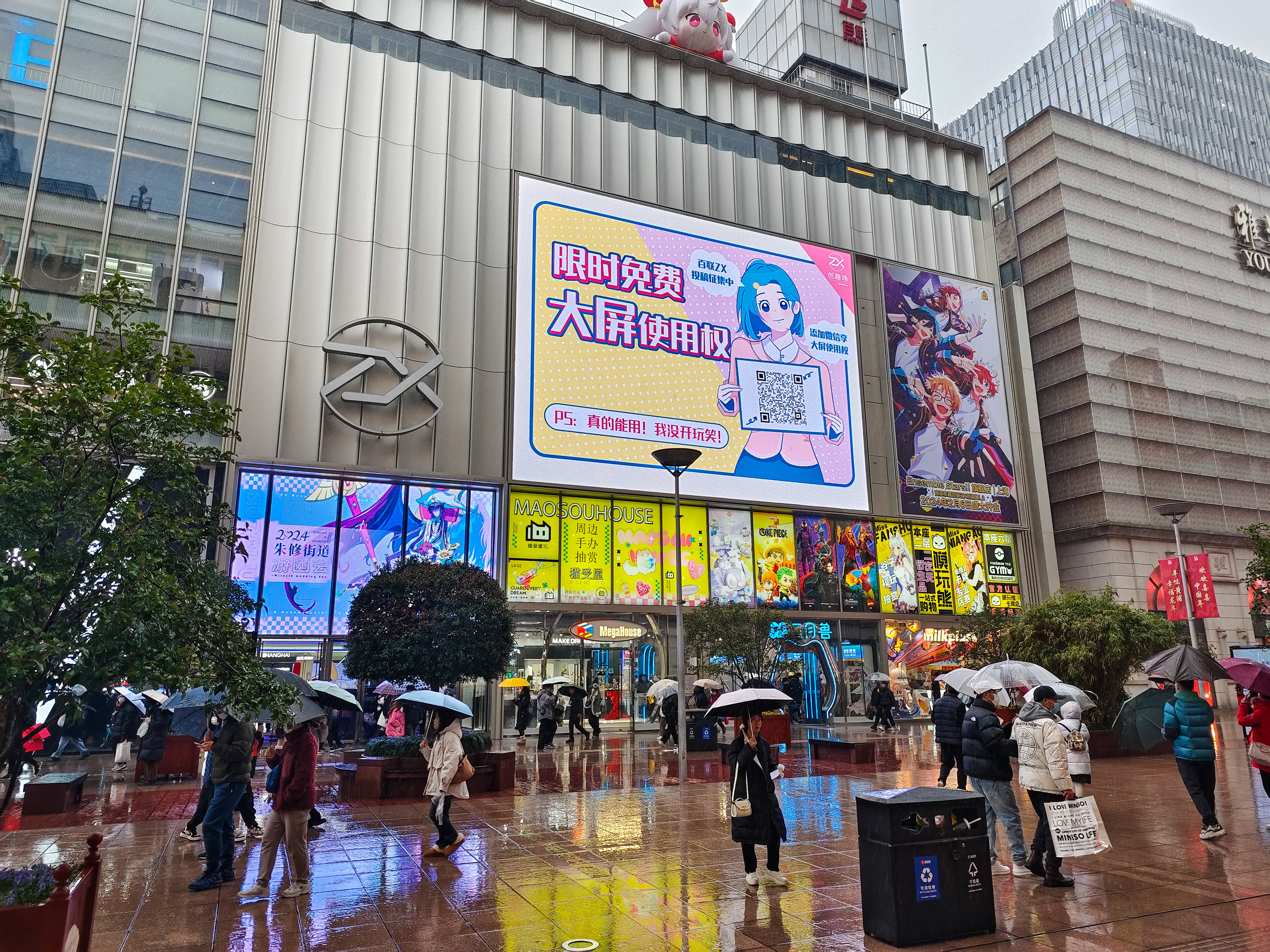
The Bailian ZX Chuangqu Field on Nanjing East Road in Shanghai was transformed from Hualian Commercial Building.
