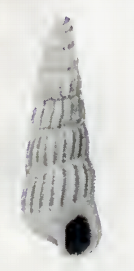
- Drawing of a shell of Turbonilla hua

Scientific classification
- Kingdom: Animalia
- Phylum: Mollusca
- Class: Gastropoda
- Family: Pyramidellidae
- Genus: Turbonilla
- Species: T. hua

Binomial name
- Turbonilla hua Bartsch, 1926

= Turbonilla hua =

Species of gastropod

Turbonilla hua is a species of sea snail, a marine gastropod mollusk in the family Pyramidellidae, the pyrams and their allies.
