= Yeonhwasan (South Gyeongsang) =

Mountain in South Korea

Coordinates: 35°04′15″N 128°15′54″E

Highest point
- Elevation: 528 m (1,732 ft)

Geography
- Location: South Gyeongsang Province, South Korea

Yeonhwasan is a mountain of South Gyeongsang Province, southeastern South Korea. It has an elevation of 528 metres.

== See also ==
- List of mountains of Korea
