= Lian, Iran =

Lian ليان
- Village
- Location within Iran
- Coordinates: 32°30′00″N 51°55′00″E
- Country: Iran
- Province: Isfahan
- County: Isfahan
- Bakhsh: Central
- Rural District: Baraan-e Jonubi

Population (2006)
  - Total: 201
- Time zone: UTC+3:30 (IRST)
  - Summer (DST): UTC+4:30 (IRDT)

Lian (Persian: ليان, also Romanized as Līān) is a village in Baraan-e Jonubi Rural District, in the Central District of Isfahan County, Isfahan Province, Iran. At the 2006 census, its population was 201, in 51 families.
