= Yeonhwasan (Ulsan) =

Mountain in South Korea

Highest point
- Elevation: 532 m (1,745 ft)
- Coordinates: 35°37′59″N 129°12′22″E

Geography
- Location: Ulsan, South Korea

Korean name
- Hangul: 연화산
- Hanja: 蓮花山
- RR: Yeonhwasan
- MR: Yŏnhwasan

Yeonhwasan is a mountain located in Ulju County, Ulsan, South Korea. It has an elevation of 532 m (1,745 ft).

== See also ==
- Geography of Korea
- List of mountains in Korea
- List of mountains by elevation
