= Lian (given name) =

Lian is a given name, and may refer to:

== Given Name ==
- Lian Bichsel, Swiss NHL player
- Gao Lian (dramatist) (16th century), Chinese writer
- Hu Lien (1907–1977), Chinese general
- Ju Lian (1828–1904), Chinese painter
- Lian Ann Tan (born 1947), Chinese Singaporean chess master
- Lian dos Santos da Silva (born 2005), Brazilian footballer
- Lian Rona (born 2008), Israeli rhythmic gymnast
- Lian Ross (born 1962), German singer
- Lian Wharton (born 1977), English cricketer
- Song Lian (1310–1381), Chinese historian
- Su Lian Tan (born 1964), Malaysian American composer
- Tan Lian Hoe (21st century), Malaysian politician
- Yang Lian (born 1955), Chinese poet
- Yang Lian (weightlifter) (born 1982), Chinese weightlifter

== Fictional ==
- Lian Harper, daughter of Roy Harper and Cheshire in the DC Comics universe
- Lian, playable character in the game Paladins
- Xie Lian, A character from the danmei novel Heaven Official's Blessing
