= Hua language =

Hua can refer to varieties of the following languages:

- The Hua (Huva) dialect of the Yagaria language of Papua New Guinea
- The Eastern ǂHuan dialect of the ǂ’Amkoe language of Botswana
- The Western ǂHuan dialect of the ǃXoon language of Botswana
- Standard Chinese in Southeast Asia
