= Hualien earthquake =

Hualien earthquake may refer to:

- 1966 Hualien earthquake
- 2009 Hualien earthquake
- 2018 Hualien earthquake
- 2019 Hualien earthquake
- 2024 Hualien earthquake (3 April 2024), a 7.4 earthquake in Hualien County, Taiwan
