= Lianhua Qiao station =

Beijing Subway station

Lianhua Qiao 莲花桥
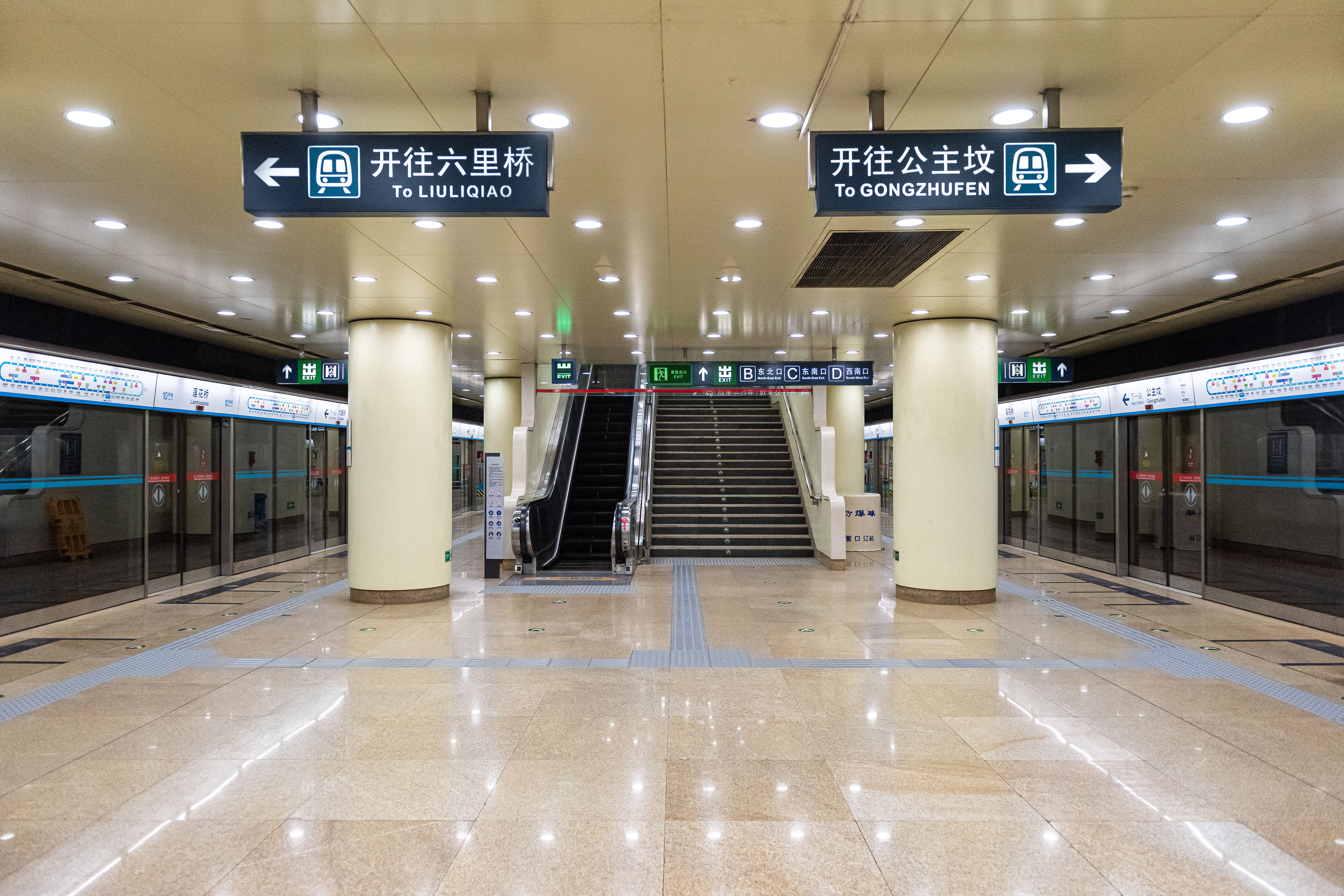
- Platform

General information
- Location: Lianhua Bridge, West 3rd Ring Road Middle and Lianhuachi West Road (莲花池西路) / Lianhuachi East Road (莲花池东路); Haidian District, Beijing; China
- Coordinates: 39.8972°N 116.3105°E
- Operator: Beijing Mass Transit Railway Operation Corporation Limited
- Line: Line 10
- Platforms: 2 (1 island platform)
- Tracks: 2

Construction
- Structure type: Underground
- Accessible: Yes

History
- Opened: December 30, 2012; 13 years ago

Services
Preceding station	Beijing Subway	Following station
Liuli Qiao outer loop / anticlockwise	Line 10	Gongzhufen inner loop / clockwise
Location
- Location within Beijing

Lianhua Qiao station (simplified Chinese: 莲花桥站; traditional Chinese: 蓮花橋站; pinyin: Liánhuā Qiáo zhàn) is a station on Line 10 of the Beijing Subway. This station opened on December 30, 2012. It will be an interchange station between Line 10 and Line 11 (Phase 2). The station is named after the nearby grade-separated junction called Lianhua Bridge.

== Station layout ==
The station has an underground island platform.

== Exits ==
There are 3 exits, lettered B, C, and D. Exit B is accessible.

== Gallery ==
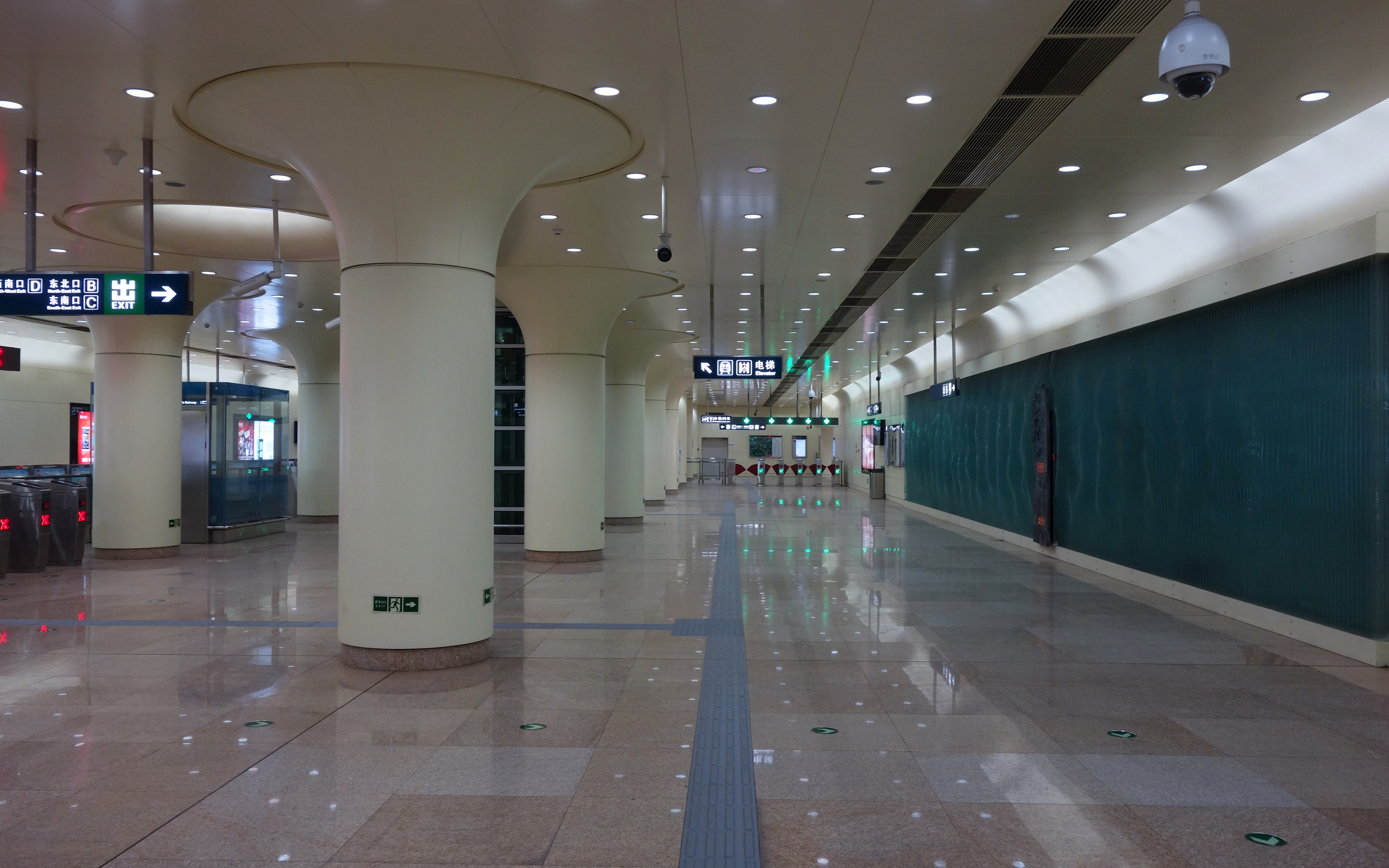
Station Hall

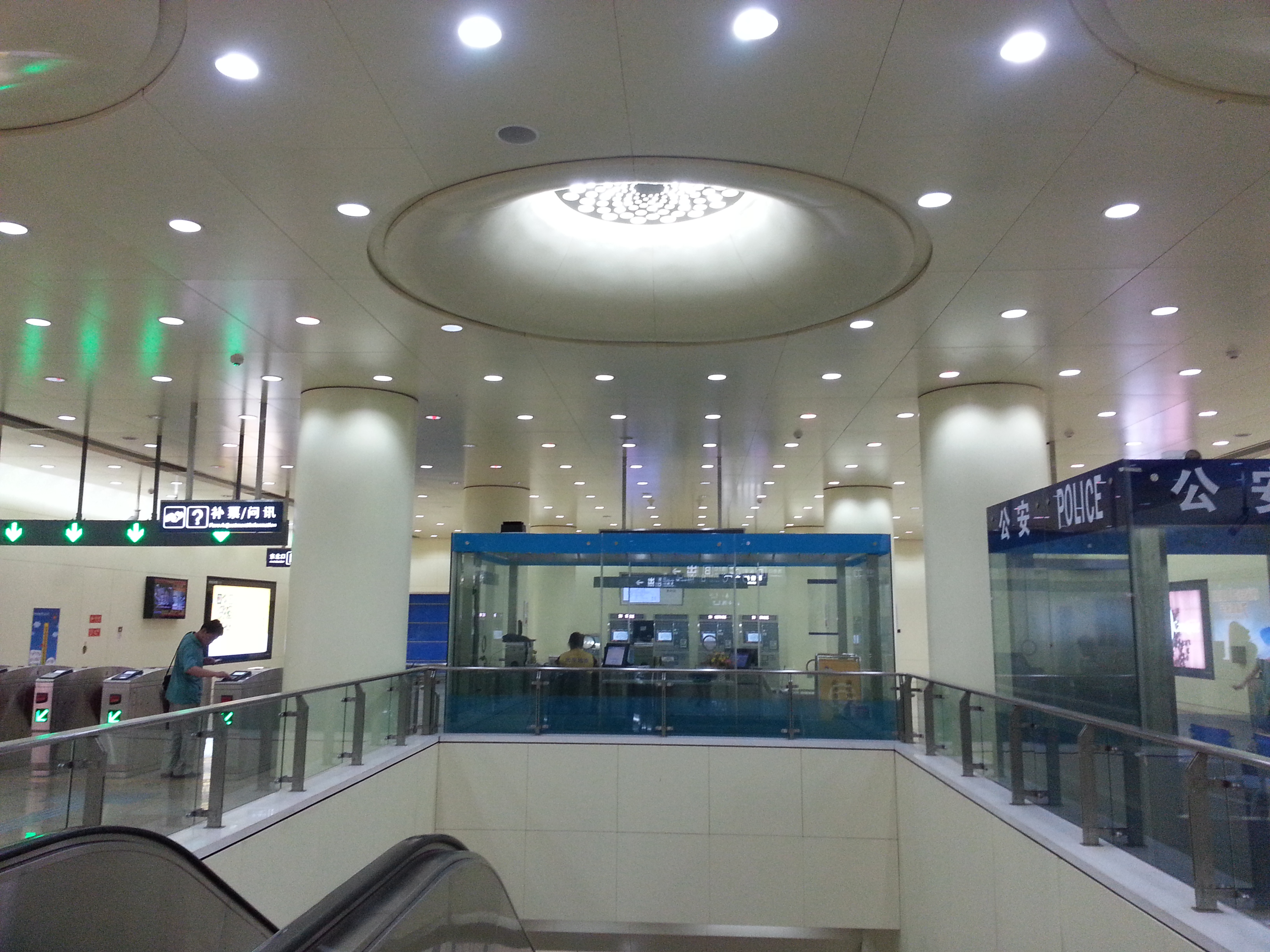

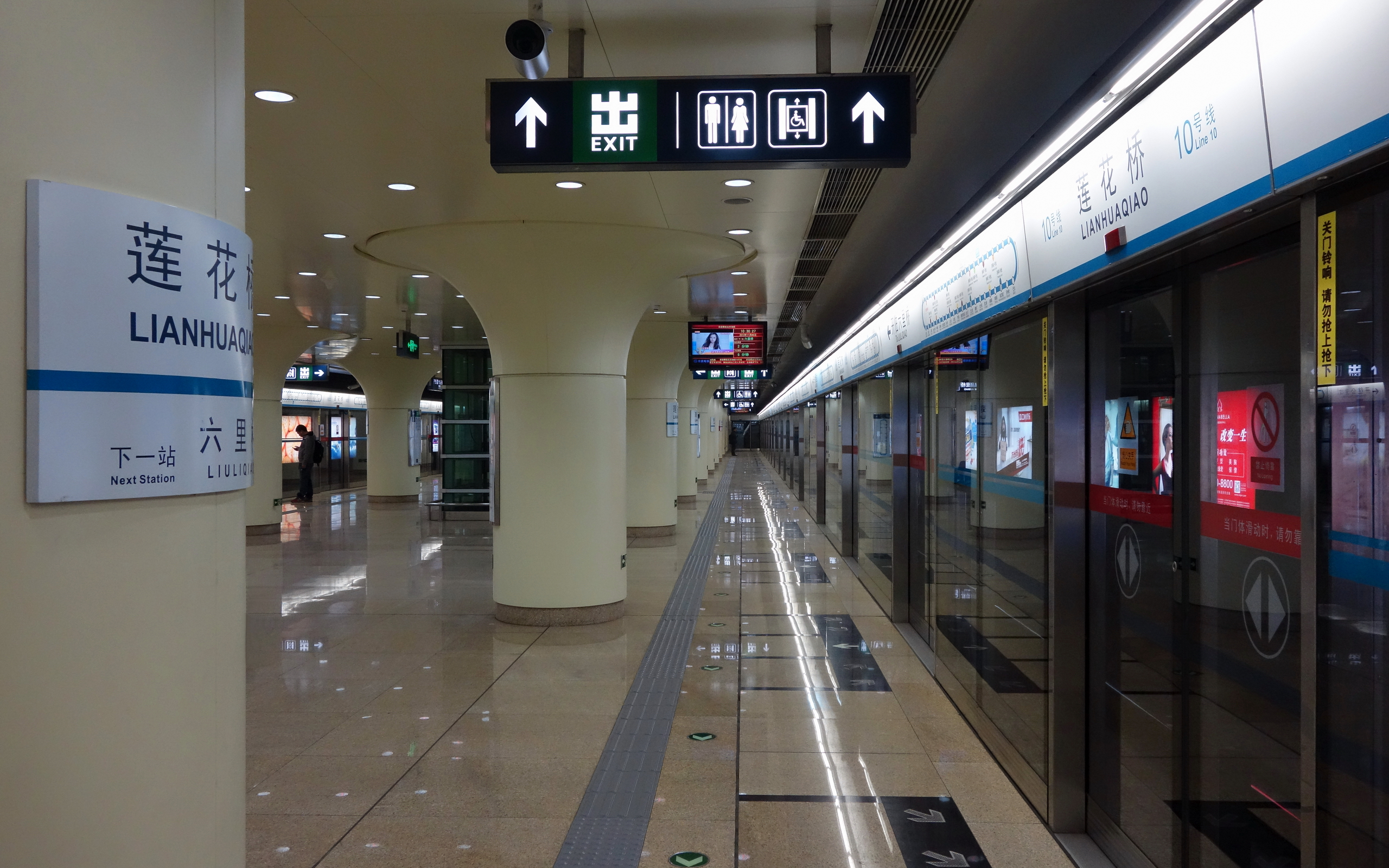
Platform
