= Lianhua Town =

Lianhua could refer to a number of towns in China:

- Lianhua, Shantou (莲华镇), in Chenghai District, Shantou, Guangdong

Written as "莲花镇":

- Lianhua, Xiamen, in Tong'an District, Xiamen, Fujian
- Lianhua, Qin'an County, in Qin'an County, Gansu
- Lianhua, Linxia County, in Linxia County, Gansu
- Lianhua, Zhaoqing, in Dinghu District, Zhaoqing, Guangdong
- Lianhua, Gongcheng County, in Gongcheng Yao Autonomous County, Guangxi
- Lianhua, Harbin, in Hulan District, Harbin, Heilongjiang
- Lianhua, Linkou County, Heilongjiang
- Lianhua, Wangkui County, Heilongjiang
- Lianhua, Wuyang County, Henan
- Lianhua, Changsha, in Yuelu District, Changsha, Hunan
- Lianhua, Jiujiang, in Lushan District, Jiujiang, Jiangxi
- Lianhua, Kaiyuan, Liaoning
- Lianhua, Zigong, in Gongjing District, Zigong, Sichuan
- Lianhua, Xingwen County, in Xingwen County, Sichuan
- Lianhua, Jiande, Zhejiang
- Lianhua, Quzhou, in Qujiang District, Quzhou, Zhejiang
