= An hua =

Variations in the thickness of porcelain to hide a small design or motif

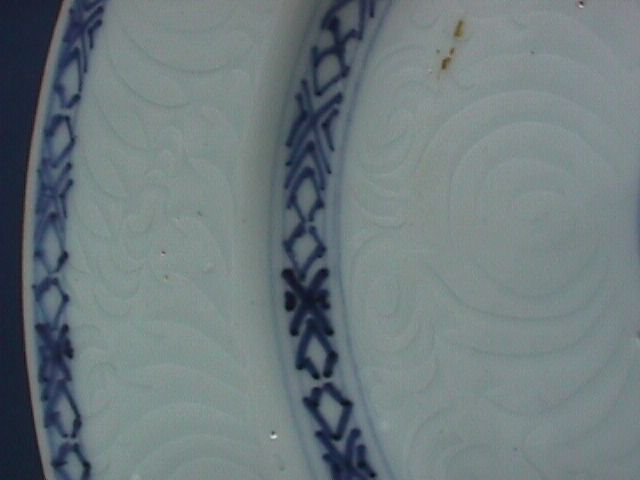
Detail of 19th-century plate with an hua decoration

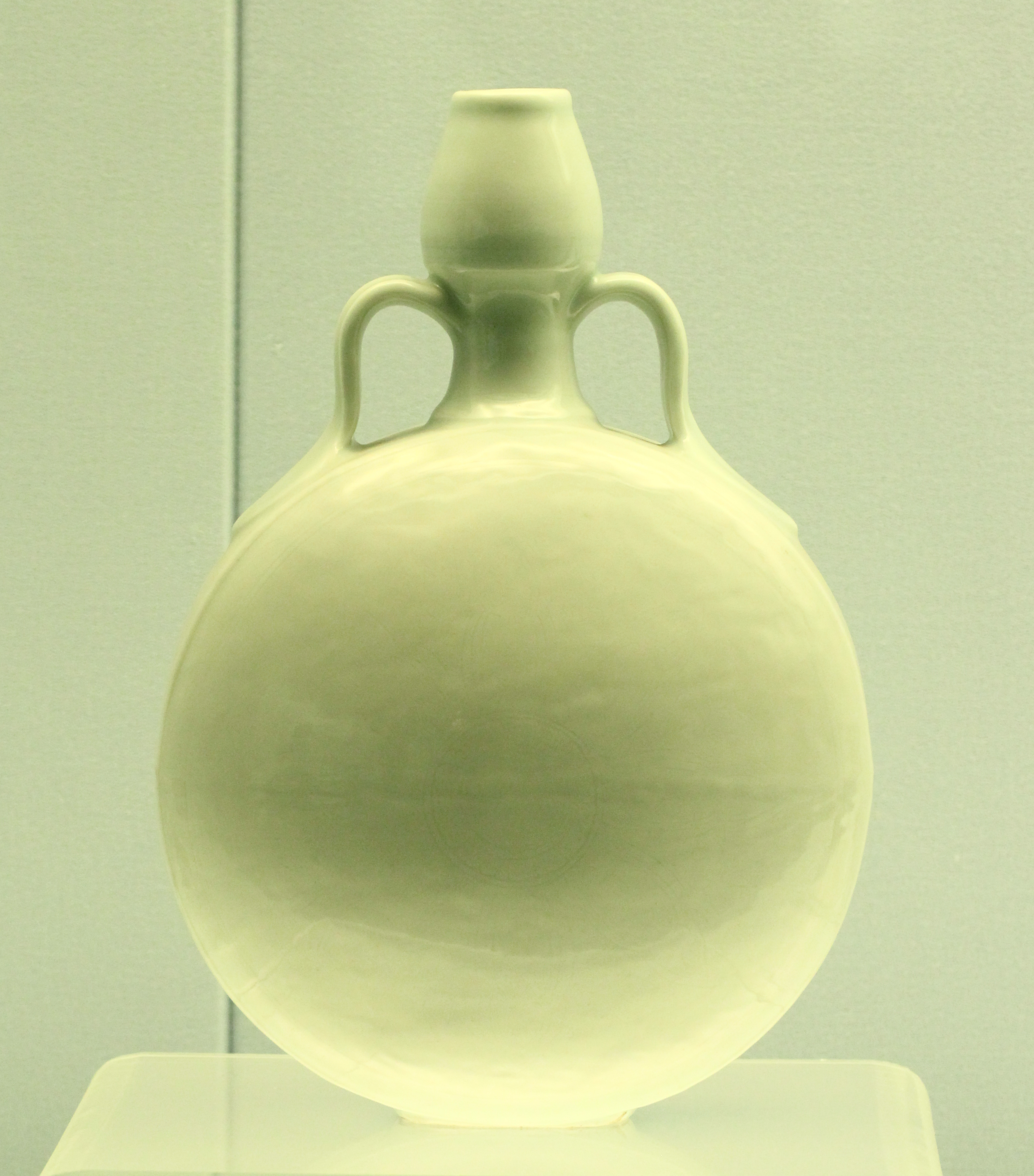
White glazed oblated pot with two ears and an hua design, Jingdezhen ware, Xuande Reign (AD 1426–1435), Ming. The veiled design, starting from a circle in the centre of the body, can just be seen in the photo, when enlarged (click on image to enlarge, then choose the maximum pixel size).

An hua (Chinese: 暗花; pinyin: ànhuā) is a term used in Chinese ceramics meaning secret or veiled decoration; the designs being visible through transmitted light, produced either by incising the design into the porcelain before glazing and firing or by delicate slip-trailing in white slip on the porcelain body. It is also called "secret" or "hidden decoration".

Incised, carved or mould-impressed monochrome decoration under a ceramic glaze was the dominant type of decoration during the Song dynasty, in types of white wares such as Ding ware and Qingbai. But the term is mainly used of the still more discreet version of the technique popularized under the Yongle Emperor (1360–1424) of the Ming dynasty (1368–1644), and continued later, particularly during the reign of the Yongzheng Emperor (1723–1735) in the Qing dynasty. Very often dragons were concealed in the interior of bowls.

Some an hua dishes were found inside a storage jar in the mid-15th century (1450–1487?) Belankan shipwreck off the coast of Indonesia, found circa 1999.

Of a teapot in the Victoria and Albert Museum (see gallery), the museum says: "One side is very subtly incised with a design of rocks and plants, and the other with a poetic couplet that reads: "At night in springtime one moment is precious like a thousand pieces of gold, the orchid sends forth its fragrance in the shade of the moon." These are the first two lines from a poem by the famous eleventh-century writer Su Shi". This suggests it was made for a scholarly gentleman.

Early pieces with floral decoration can be seen as a compromise between the traditionalist elite preference for plain monochrome porcelains and the growing taste for ornament, initially seen only in "popular wares" such as Cizhou ware, before being adopted by the elite during the Yuan dynasty.

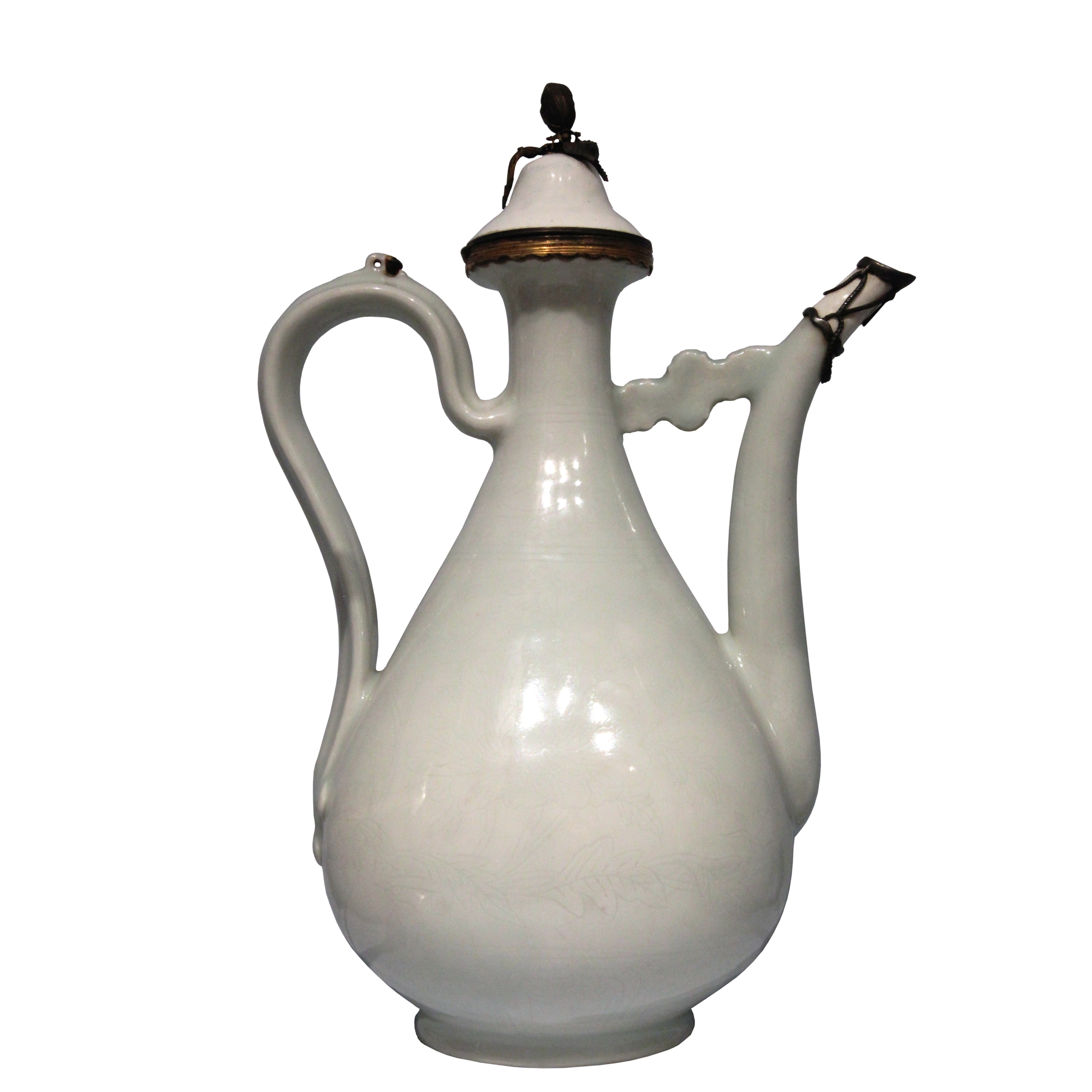
Ewer, Ming, Yongle reign, 1403–1424

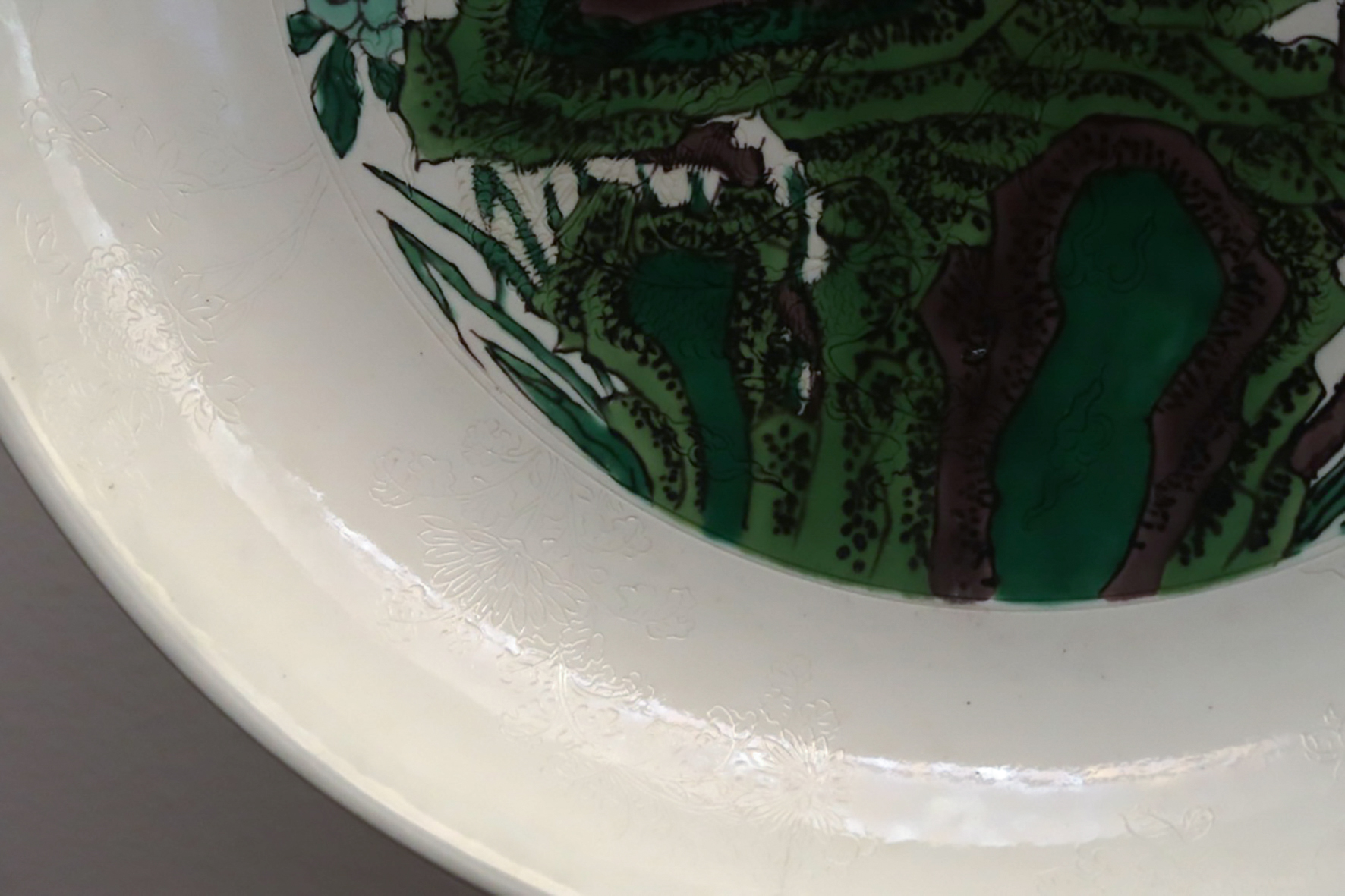
Detail of Kangxi reign dish

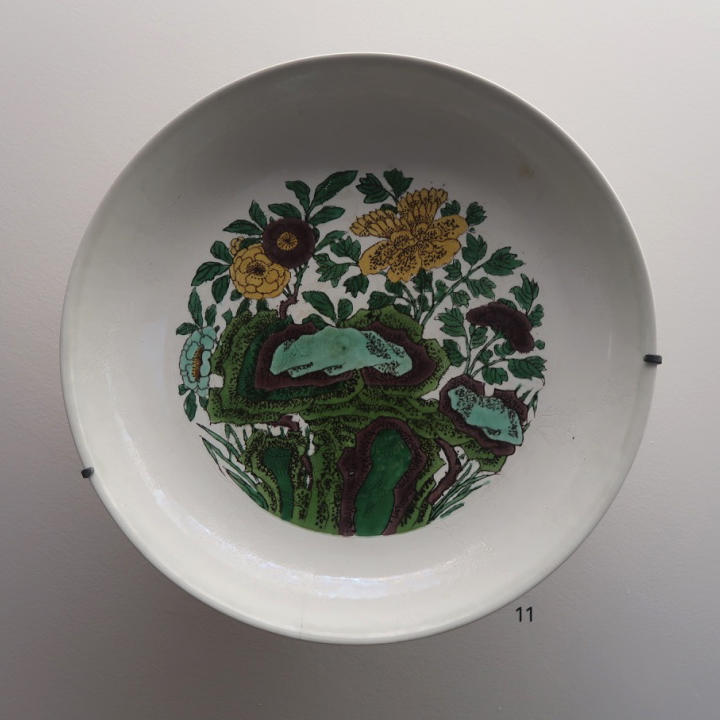
The whole dish

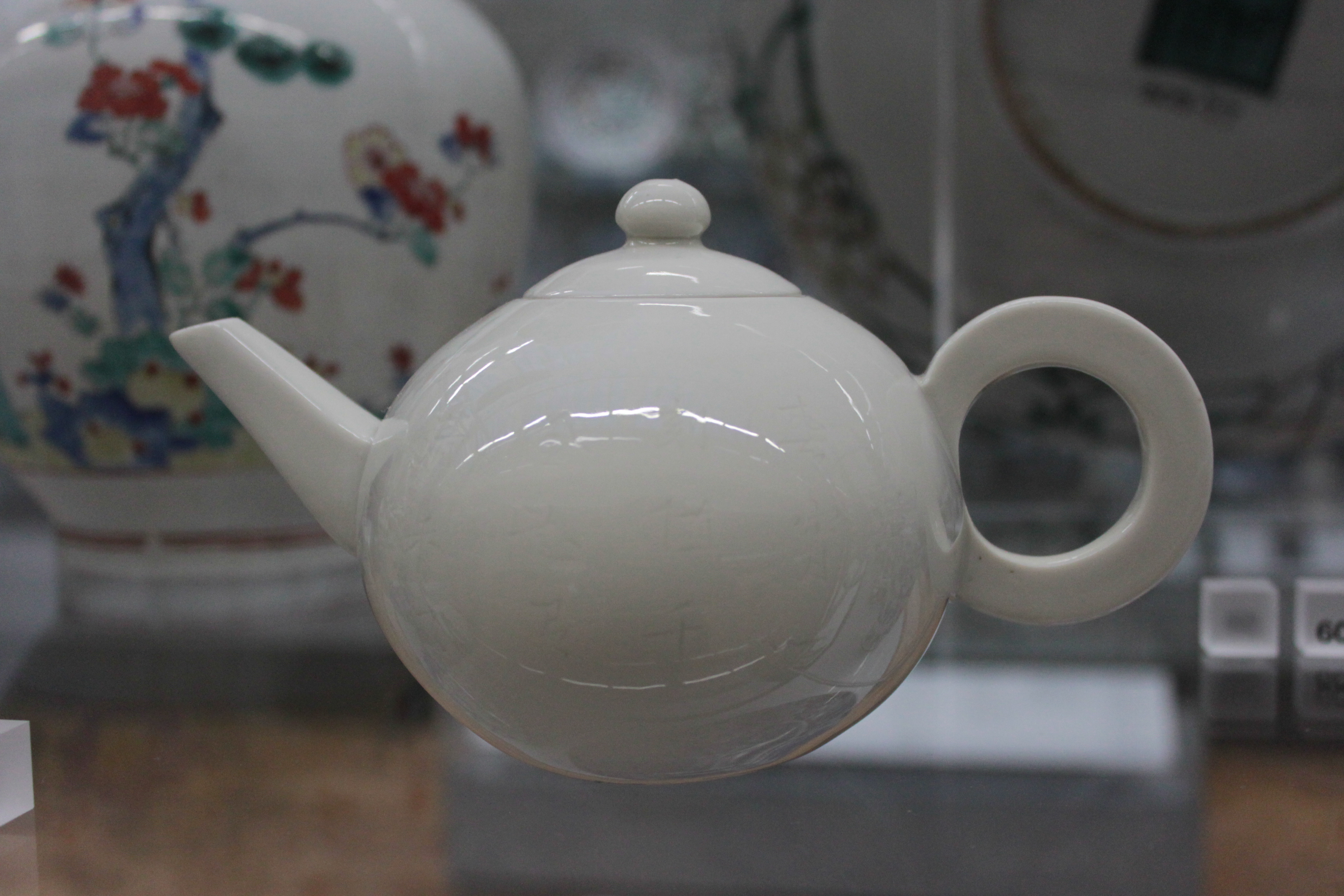
Dehua porcelain wine/teapot, 1690–1720, Victoria and Albert Museum. See text; this is the side with the couplet.

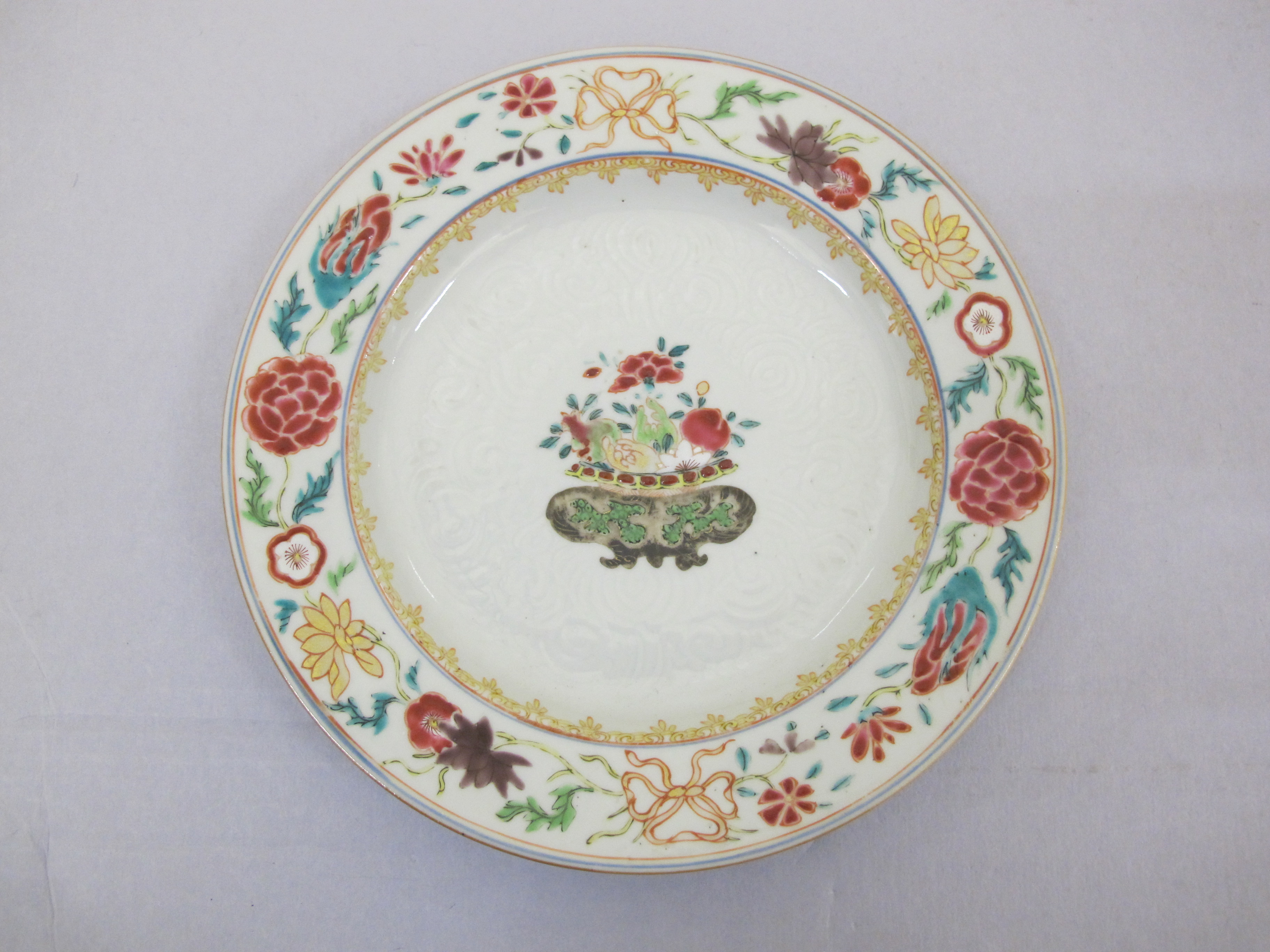
18th-century plate

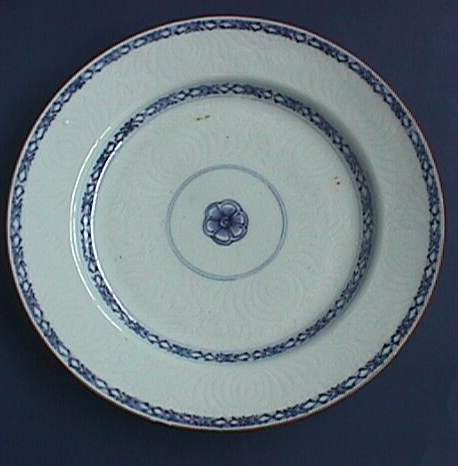
The whole plate shown above
