= Linfa =

Linfa or Lin Fa may refer to:

== Tropical cyclones ==
- List of storms named Linfa, a list of tropical cyclones named Linfa

== Plants ==
- Nelumbo nucifera, a flower named Linfa in Cantonese
- Oroxylum indicum, also called Linfa in Loei

== People ==
- Linfa Wang, professor at Duke-NUS Medical School, Singapore

== Places ==
- Lotus Hill, a hill in Guangdong also named Linfa Hill, Guangdong
- Lianhuashan Park, a park in Shenzhen also named Linfa Hill, Shenzhen
- Lin Fa Shan, a mountain in Lantau, Hong Kong
- Lin Fa Shan, Tsuen Wan, a mountain in Tsuen Wan, Hong Kong
- Lin Fa Temple, a temple in Wan Chai, Hong Kong
- Lin Fa Tei, a village in Yuen Long, Hong Kong
- Guangzhou Lianhuashan railway station, a station on the Guanghui ICR of the PRDIR.
