= Lianhua Supermarket =

Chinese supermarket chain

Lianhua Supermarket Holdings Co., Ltd.
- Traditional Chinese: 聯華超市股份有限公司
- Simplified Chinese: 联华超市股份有限公司
Transcriptions
Standard Mandarin
- Hanyu Pinyin: Lián Huá Chāoshì Gǔfènyǒuxiàngōngsī

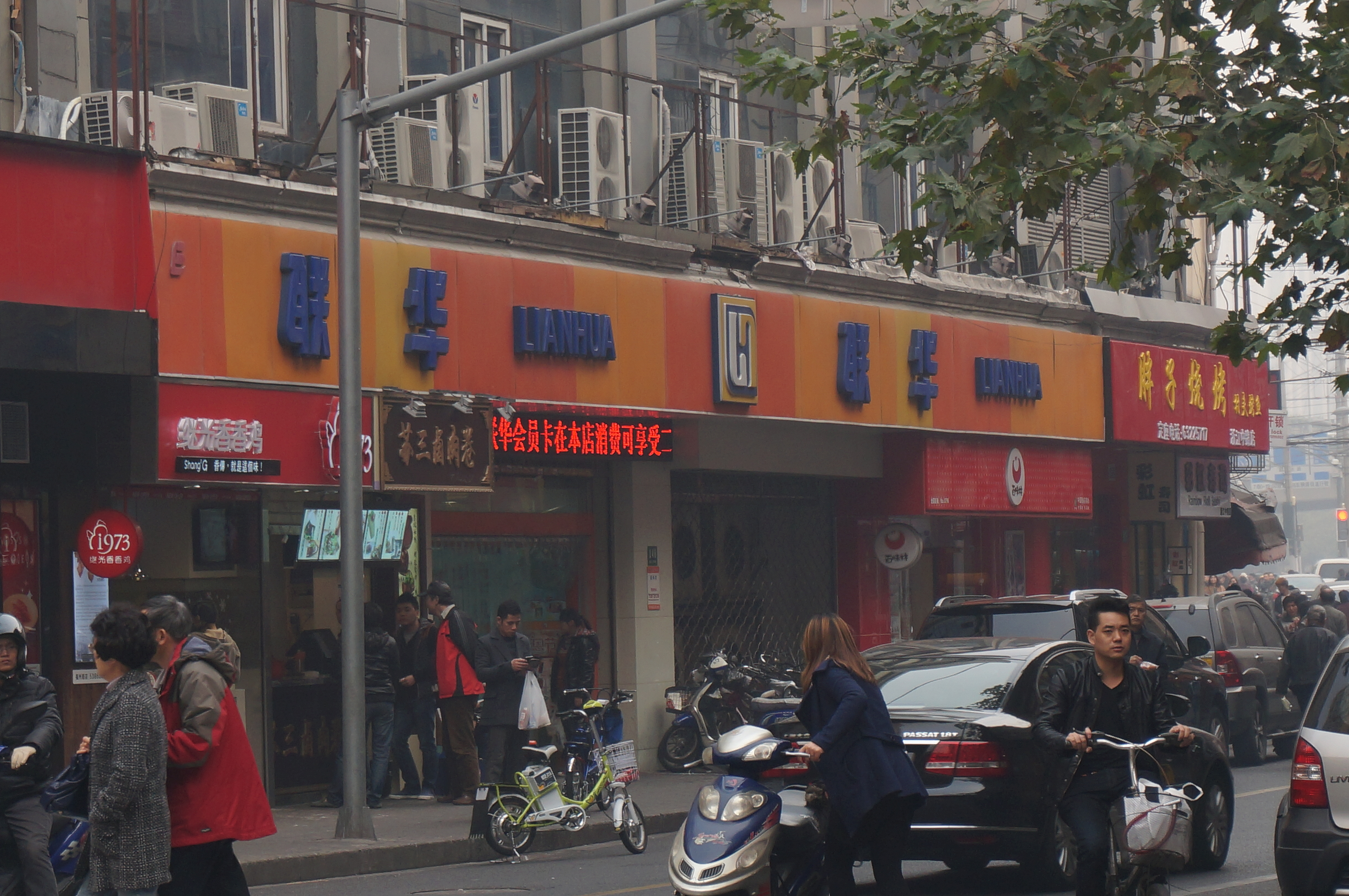
A Lianhua supermarket in Huangpu District, Shanghai

Lianhua Supermarket Holdings Co., Ltd. (Hong Kong Stock Exchange: 00980.HK) is a Chinese supermarket company that is a subsidiary of the Bailian Group (百联集团). The company has offices in Shanghai and Hong Kong.

The first store opened in Shanghai in 1991. On 27 June 2003 the company was listed on the Hong Kong Stock Exchange. In 2009 Lianhua purchased Hualian Supermarkets from its parent company for 492 million yuan. As of that date, including the Hualian stores, Lianhua had 5,268 stores including 3,184 supermarkets.

== Corporate affairs ==
The company has a place of business and registered office in Shanghai and a place of business in Hong Kong. The Shanghai office is in Putuo District. The Hong Kong office, listed as the company address on the investor's relations website, is on the 26th and 27th floors of the Harcourt Building (T: 夏慤大廈, S: 夏悫大厦) in Wanchai. Previously the Shanghai office was located in Hongkou District.

=== Store types ===
The company's supermarket brands are Lianhua Supermarket and Hualian Supermarket (S: 华联超市, T: 華聯超市, P: Huálián Chāoshì). Its convenience store brand is Lianhua Quik (C: 快客便利, P: Kuàikè Biànlì). Its hypermarket brand is Century Mart (S: 世纪联华, T: 世紀聯華, P: Shìjì Liánhuá).
